= 2009 in Nigeria =

- Decades: 1980s; 1990s; 2000s; 2010s; 2020s
- See also: Other events of 2009; Timeline of Nigerian history

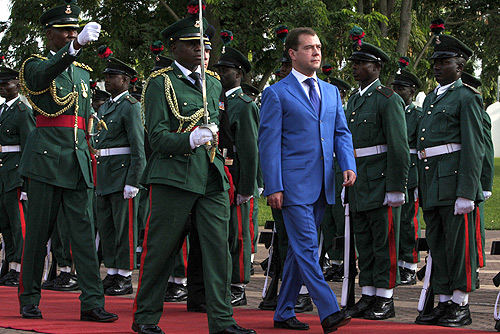
Nigeria in 2009; Official ceremony to greet the President of Russia, arriving in Nigeria on an official visit.

Events in the year 2009 in Nigeria.

== Incumbents ==
=== Federal government ===
- President: Umaru Musa Yar'Adua (PDP)
- Vice President: Goodluck Jonathan (PDP)
- Senate President: David Mark (PDP)
- House Speaker: Dimeji Bankole (PDP)
- Chief Justice: Idris Legbo Kutigi (until 30 December), Aloysius Iyorgyer Katsina-Alu (starting 30 December)

=== Governors ===
- Abia State: Theodore Orji (PDP)
- Adamawa State: Murtala Nyako (PDP)
- Akwa Ibom State: Godswill Akpabio (PDP)
- Anambra State: Peter Obi (APGA)
- Bauchi State: Isa Yuguda (ANPP)
- Bayelsa State: Timipre Sylva (PDP)
- Benue State: Gabriel Suswam (PDP)
- Borno State: Ali Modu Sheriff (ANPP)
- Cross River State: Liyel Imoke (PDP)
- Delta State: Emmanuel Uduaghan (PDP)
- Ebonyi State: Martin Elechi (PDP)
- Edo State: Adams Aliyu Oshiomle (AC)
- Ekiti State: Olusegun Oni (PDP)
- Enugu State: Sullivan Chime (PDP)
- Gombe State: Mohammed Danjuma Goje (PDP)
- Imo State: Ikedi Ohakim (PDP)
- Jigawa State: Sule Lamido (PDP)
- Kaduna State: Namadi Sambo (PDP)
- Kano State: Ibrahim Shekarau (ANPP)
- Katsina State: Ibrahim Shema (PDP)
- Kebbi State: Usman Saidu Nasamu Dakingari (PDP)
- Kogi State: Ibrahim Idris (PDP)
- Kwara State: Bukola Saraki (AC)
- Lagos State: Babatunde Fashola (AC)
- Nasarawa State: Aliyu Doma (PDP)
- Niger State: Mu'azu Babangida Aliyu (PDP)
- Ogun State: Gbenga Daniel (PDP)
- Ondo State: Olusegun Agagu (PDP)
- Osun State: Olagunsoye Oyinlola (PDP)
- Oyo State: Christopher Alao-Akala (PDP)
- Plateau State: Jonah David Jang (PDP)
- Rivers State: Chibuike Amaechi (PDP)
- Sokoto State: Aliyu Magatakarda Wamakko (PDP)
- Taraba State: Danbaba Suntai (PDP)
- Yobe State: Ibrahim Gaidam (ANPP)
- Zamfara State: Mahmud Shinkafi (PDP)

== Events ==
- January – Start of an meningitis outbreak in four West African countries, including Nigeria.
- 5 May – Olusegun Oni, the incumbent Governors of Ekiti State, was announced to have won the gubernatorial by-election.
- 26 to 29 July – Boko Haram, an Islamic extremist group, launched an uprising in Bauchi State and expanded across northern Nigeria.
- 1 October – Establishment of private university Afe Babalola University.
- October – Bellview Airlines, an international airline based in Lagos State, ceased its operations.
- 24 October to 15 November – 2009 FIFA U-17 World Cup was held on several stadiums across Nigeria.
- 25 December – Umar Farouk Abdulmutallab, an Islamic extremist, attempted to bomb the Northwest Airlines Flight 253 while it was travelling from Amsterdam to Detroit.

== Deaths ==
- 14 June – Abel Tador, Nigerian professional football player (born 1984)
- 30 July – Mohammed Yusuf, founder of Boko Haram (born 1970)
- 20 September – Bayo Ohu, Nigerian journalist (born 1964)
