= 2014 in Nigeria =

- Decades: 1990s; 2000s; 2010s; 2020s
- See also: Other events of 2014; Timeline of Nigerian history

The following lists events from 2014 in Nigeria.

== Incumbents ==
=== Federal government ===
- President: Goodluck Jonathan (PDP)
- Vice President: Namadi Sambo (PDP)
- Senate President: David Mark (PDP)
- House Speaker: Aminu Waziri Tambuwal (PDP)
- Chief Justice: Aloma Mariam Mukhtar (Until November); Mahmud Mohammed (Starting November)

=== Governors ===
- Abia State: Theodore Orji
- Adamawa State:
  - Until 15 July: Murtala Nyako
  - 15 July - 1 October: Ahmadu Umaru Fintiri
  - Starting 1 October: Bala James Ngilari
- Akwa Ibom State: Godswill Akpabio
- Anambra State: Peter Obi (until 17 March); Willie Obiano (starting 17 March)
- Bauchi State: Isa Yuguda
- Bayelsa State: Henry Seriake Dickson
- Benue State: Gabriel Suswam
- Borno State: Kashim Shettima
- Cross River State: Liyel Imoke
- Delta State: Emmanuel Uduaghan
- Ebonyi State: Martin Elechi
- Edo State: Adams Oshiomhole
- Ekiti State: Ayo Fayose
- Enugu State: Sullivan Chime
- Gombe State: Ibrahim Hassan Dankwambo
- Imo State: Rochas Okorocha
- Jigawa State: Sule Lamido
- Kaduna State: Mukhtar Ramalan Yero
- Kano State: Rabiu Kwankwaso
- Katsina State: Ibrahim Shema
- Kebbi State:
- Kogi State: Idris Wada
- Kwara State: Abdulfatah Ahmed
- Lagos State: Babatunde Fashola
- Nasarawa State: Umaru Tanko Al-Makura
- Niger State: Mu'azu Babangida Aliyu
- Ogun State: Ibikunle Amosun
- Ondo State: Olusegun Mimiko
- Osun State: Rauf Aregbesola
- Oyo State: Christopher Alao-Akala
- Plateau State: Jonah David Jang
- Rivers State: Chibuike Amaechi (APC)
- Sokoto State: Aliyu Magatakarda Wamakko
- Taraba State: Abubakar Sani Danladi
- Yobe State: Ibrahim Gaidam
- Zamfara State: Abdul'aziz Abubakar Yari

== Events ==
=== January ===
- January 6 – Gunmen kill 30 people in the central Nigerian village of Shonong in the Riyom local government area.
- January 15 – An anti-LGBT rights law that makes gay marriage punishable by up to 14 years in prison is passed.
- January 26 – A massacre in Kawuri was taken place. The final death toll was put at 85. The attacks were blamed on Boko Haram.
- January 26 – In Chakawa the throats of several church worshippers were slit, while others were shot. An estimated 31 people were killed, but this was revised to the figure of 41.
- January 27 – Sixty-one people are feared to have been killed following gun attacks in the states of Adamawa and Borno.

=== February ===
- February 14 – Boko Haram terrorists massacred against the Christian Villagers in Konduga, Borno State, leading to at least 121 deaths.
- February 15 – Gunmen suspected of being members of Boko Haram, entered the village of Izghe, Borno State in the early hours of the morning and murdered 105 men and 1 elderly woman.
- February 16 – Suspected Islamist militants kill 90 people in a Nigerian village raid near the border with Cameroon.
- February 25 – Fifty-nine boys were killed at the Federal Government College of Buni Yadi in Yobe State, suspected to be done by Boko Haram.

=== March ===
- March 2 – Over 100 people die in several bomb attacks in Nigeria.
- March 3 – Violence across Nigeria, between Islamic terrorists and the Nigerian military, kills dozens of people.
- March 14 – Islamic militants attack a Nigerian Army barracks in Maiduguri, Borno State.
- March 15 – 6.5 million people in all 37 states of Nigeria (including the FCT) stormed various recruitment centers in the country for the 4000 vacant positions in the Nigeria Immigration Service.

=== April ===
- April 6 – Nigeria's economy passes South Africa's to become the largest in Africa.
- April 12 – Borno State Senator Ahmed Zannah reports that 135 civilians have been killed in attacks in north west Nigeria since Wednesday.
- April 14 – Two bombs exploded at a crowded bus station 8 km southwest of central Abuja, killing at least 88 people and injuring at least 200.
- April 15 – 276 female students were kidnapped from the Government Secondary School in the town of Chibok in Borno State, by Boko Haram.
- April 20 – Boko Haram claimed responsibility for the Abuja bombing.
- April 30 – Protesters in Abuja hold a "million woman" march over the mass kidnapping of schoolgirls by the Boko Haram terrorist group two weeks ago.

=== May ===
- May 1 – A car bomb attack in Abuja kills at least nine people.
- May 5 – Naomi Mutah Nyadar, the leader of the One Million Women protest in Nigeria over failure to act on the kidnapping of 203 schoolgirls by terrorist group Boko Haram, is reportedly detained on the orders of First Lady of Nigeria Patience Jonathan.
- May 6 – Eight additional Nigerian girls are abducted by suspected Boko Haram militants following the Chibok kidnappings.
- May 7 – At least 125 people are killed in a massacre in Gamboru Ngala, Borno State.
- May 12 – A new video released by the Islamist terrorist group Boko Haram claims to show 100 girls they kidnapped last month as they seek a prisoner exchange.
- May 13 – Villagers in the Nigerian Kala/Balge district of Borno State form a vigilante group and successfully repel an attack from the terrorist Islamist group Boko Haram, seizing three cars and a military vehicle and killing around 200 of the militants.
- May 17 – Nigeria, Niger, Cameroon, Benin, and Chad join to combat Boko Haram.
- May 18 – A blast hits the northern Nigerian city of Kano.
- May 20 – Two explosions occur near a crowded market in Jos killing at least 118 people.
- May 21 – Boko Haram attacks the village of Alagarno, in Borno State, killing 17 people.
- May 24 – Boko Haram militants rampage through three villages in northern Nigeria killing 28 people.
- May 26 – Air Marshal Alex Barde, the Nigeria head of defense, tells protesters in Abuja that the military knows where the 300 girls kidnapped by Boko Haram are but are reluctant to rescue them due to the fear of having them killed.
- May 26 – Islamist terror group Boko Haram kills at least 33 security personnel during attacks in Nigeria's northeastern Yobe State.
- May 30 – Islamist terror group Boko Haram abduct two prominent traditional rulers from Borno State.

=== June ===
- June 1 – Islamist insurgency in Nigeria
  - A bombing at a football match in the town of Mubi kills at least 40 people.
  - Two Italian priests and a Canadian nun kidnapped by suspected Boko Haram gunmen have been released.
- June 3 – Boko Haram militants kill dozens of people in fresh attacks on villages in Borno state.
- June 3 – Nigerian police in Abuja ban all protests planned in support of the 276 girls kidnapped from northern Nigeria by Boko Haram.
- June 5 – Suspected Boko Haram militants launch an attack in a village near Maiduguri, killing approximately 45 people.
- June 17 – A suicide bomber detonates a tricycle taxi filled with explosives at an outdoor viewing venue for the 2014 FIFA World Cup in Damaturu, resulting in several deaths and 15 people critically injured.
- June 23 – An explosion at a public health school in the city of Kano kills at least 12 people.
- June 25 – Nigerian police say that 21 people have been killed in an explosion at a crowded Banex Plaza shopping center in Abuja's Wuse 2 district.
- June 28 – A blast in a brothel in the northeastern city of Bauchi kills at least 11 people and injures 28.
- June 29 – Islamist extremists torch four churches near the town of Chibok and fire on worshippers killing at least 30.
- June 29 – More than 200 students were still missing and Boko Haram has said that it wants to sell the girls.

=== July ===
- July 1 – A car bomb explodes in a market in Maiduguri, the birthplace of Boko Haram, with dozens feared dead.
- July 18 – Many people are feared dead after suspected Boko Haram militants raided the town of Damboa with substantial parts of the town including the market burnt down. So far, 18 bodies have been recovered with the death toll expected to rise.
- July 23 – Two explosions rip through Kaduna killing at least 82 people.
- July 25 – A Liberian official visiting Lagos dies of the Ebola virus becoming the first reported death in Nigeria.
- July 27 – Gunmen believed to be members of Boko Haram abduct the wife of Deputy Prime Minister of Cameroon Amadou Ali.

=== August ===
- August 8 – Nigeria becomes the third African nation to declare a state of emergency over the outbreak.
- August 15 – Suspected Islamist Boko Haram fighters have abducted dozens of boys and men in Doron Baga, a remote, sandy fishing village in the northeast, in Borno State, near Lake Chad.
- August 17 – Chadian troops rescue 85 hostages from Boko Haram who had been kidnapped in Nigeria and taken over the border into Chad.
- August 23 – Thirty-five Nigerian police officers are missing following an attack on a training school in Borno state.
- August 25 – Boko Haram declares an Islamic state in areas of Nigeria under its control.

=== September ===
- September 2 – Dozens of people are killed as Boko Haram captures the town of Bama.
- September 4 – The Ebola death total exceeds 1,900, according to the World Health Organization.
- September 11 – The Elders Forum in the state of Borno warns that Boko Haram militants have surrounded the city of Maiduguri.
- September 14 – The death toll from a collapse of T. B. Joshua's The Synagogue Church of All Nations on Friday in the Ikotun area of Lagos reaches 40.
- September 17 – At least 13 people are dead and 34 injured after Boko Haram gunmen attack a government college in the northern Nigerian city of Kano.
- September 26 – The World Health Organization says that the death toll from the Ebola virus is over 2,900.
- September 27 – The official death toll from the Ebola virus outbreak reaches 3,000 with the World Health Organization warning that the official figures "vastly underestimate the true scale of the epidemic".

=== October ===
- October 12 – At least 26 people have been killed in tribal clashes in Plateau State over the past week.
- October 23 – Boko Haram abducts "dozens" of women and girls in Adamawa State, specifically in the villages of Wanga Mangoro and Garta.
- October 31 – A bomb blast in Gombe kills at least 32 people.

=== November ===
- November 10 – A suicide bomber kills at least 47 students at a school assembly in Potiskum in Yobe state.
- November 14 – Boko Haram seizes control of the northeastern town of Chibok, Borno State.
- November 16 – Islamist insurgency in Nigeria
  - A female suicide bomber kills 13 people in the town of Abare.
  - The Nigerian army drives the militant group out of Chibok two days after the town's capture.
- November 19 – Boko Haram kill at least 45 in a reprisal attack on a village.
- November 23 – Boko Haram militants kill 48 fish traders near the border with Chad.
- November 24 – Boko Haram captures Damasak, killing 50 and forcing more than 3,000 to flee across the border into Niger.
- November 25 – Two teenage girl suicide bombers kill more than 40 people in Maiduguri.
- November 27 – A roadside bomb planted at a bus station near the town of Mubi kills 40, including 5 soldiers.
- November 28 – Gunmen set off three bombs and fire at worshippers at the central mosque in Kano attached to the palace of Emir Sanusi Lamido Sanusi, a week after he issued a call to arms against Boko Haram. At least 120 people have died and 270 are injured.
- November 29 – Suspected Boko Haram militants storm the Christian-majority town of Shani, leaving dozens dead.

=== December ===
- December 1 – Dual Boko Haram attacks in Maiduguri and Damaturu leave at least 77 dead, including 33 police, 6 soldiers, and 20 militants.
- December 6 – Unidentified gunmen break into a prison and free an estimated 200 inmates in Minna, west-central Niger State.
- December 11 – Two bombs explode in Jos with at least 40 people dead.
- December 18 – News emerges, after survivors reach the city of Maiduguri, that suspected Boko Haram militants stormed the remote village of Gumsuri in north-eastern Nigeria on December 14, killing at least 33 people and kidnapping about 200.
- December 22 – Bombings hit Gombe and Bauchi, killing at least 26 people.
- December 22 – Nigeria abstains placing North Korea's human rights record on the United Nations Security Council's agenda.
- December 23 – The death toll from the bombings in Gombe and Bauchi reaches at least 37.
