= 2015 in Nigeria =

- Decades: 1990s; 2000s; 2010s; 2020s
- See also: Other events of 2015; Timeline of Nigerian history

The following lists events that happened during 2015 in Nigeria.

== Incumbents ==
=== Federal government ===
- President: Goodluck Jonathan (until 29 May), Muhammadu Buhari (starting 29 May)
- Vice President: Namadi Sambo (until 29 May), Yemi Osinbajo (starting 29 May)
- Senate President: David Mark (Until June); Bukola Saraki (Starting June)
- House Speaker: Aminu Waziri Tambuwal (Until June) Yakubu Dogara (Starting June)
- Chief Justice: Mahmud Mohammed

=== Governors ===
- Abia State: Theodore Orji (until 29 May); Okezie Ikpeazu (PDP) (starting 29 May)
- Adamawa State: Bala James Ngilari (until 29 May); Bindo Jibrilla (APC) (starting 29 May)
- Akwa Ibom State: Godswill Akpabio (until 29 May) Udom Emmanuel (PDP) (starting 29 May)
- Anambra State: Willie Obiano (APGA)
- Bauchi State: Isa Yuguda (until 29 May); M. A. Abubakar (APC)
- Bayelsa State: Henry Dickson (PDP)
- Benue State: Gabriel Suswam (until 29 May); Samuel Ortom (APC) (starting 29 May)
- Borno State: Kashim Shettima (APC)
- Cross River State: Liyel Imoke (until 29 May); Ben Ayade (PDP) (starting 29 May)
- Delta State: Emmanuel Uduaghan (until 29 May); Ifeanyi Okowa (PDP) (starting 29 May)
- Ebonyi State: Martin Elechi (until 29 May); Dave Umahi (PDP) (starting 29 May)
- Edo State: Adams A. Oshiomhole (APC)
- Ekiti State: Ayo Fayose (PDP)
- Enugu State: Sullivan Chime (until 29 May); Ifeanyi Ugwuanyi (PDP) (starting 29 May)
- Gombe State: Ibrahim Dankwambo (PDP)
- Imo State: Rochas Okorocha (APC)
- Jigawa State: Sule Lamido (until 29 May); Badaru Abubakar (APC) (starting 29 May)
- Kaduna State: Mukhtar Ramalan Yero (until 29 May); Nasir el-Rufai (APC) (starting 29 May)
- Kano State: Rabiu Kwankwaso (until 29 May); Umar Ganduje (APC) (starting 29 May)
- Katsina State: Ibrahim Shema (until 29 May); Aminu Masari (APC) (starting 29 May)
- Kebbi State: Usman Saidu Nasamu Dakingari (PDP) (Until 29 May) Abubakar Atiku Bagudu (APC) (starting 29 May)
- Kogi State: Idris Wada (PDP)
- Kwara State: Abdulfatah Ahmed (APC)
- Lagos State: Babatunde Fashola (until 29 May); Akinwumi Ambode (APC) (starting 29 May)
- Nasarawa State: Umaru Al-Makura (APC)
- Niger State: Mu'azu Babangida Aliyu (until 29 May); Abubakar Sani Bello (APC) (starting 29 May)
- Ogun State: Ibikunle Amosun (APC)
- Ondo State: Olusegun Mimiko (LP)
- Osun State: Rauf Aregbesola (APC)
- Oyo State: Abiola Ajimobi (APC)
- Plateau State: Jonah David Jang (until 29 May); Simon Lalong (APC) (starting 29 May)
- Rivers State: Chibuike Amaechi (until 29 May), Ezenwo Nyesom Wike (starting 29 May)
- Sokoto State: Aliyu Magatakarda Wamakko (until 29 May); Aminu Tambuwal (APC) (starting 29 May)
- Taraba State: Abubakar Sani Danladi (until 29 May); Darius Ishaku (PDP) (starting 29 May)
- Yobe State: Ibrahim Geida (APC)
- Zamfara State: Abdul-aziz Yari Abubakar (APC)

== Events ==
=== January ===
- 1 January – A suicide bomber detonates his explosive belt at a church during a New Year's mass in Gombe killing only the bomber but hurting eight people.
- 3 January – Fleeing villagers from a remote part of the Borno State report that Boko Haram had three days prior kidnapped around 40 boys and young men.
- 5 January – News emerges that two days prior hundreds of Boko Haram militants had overrun several towns in northeast Nigeria and captured the military base in Baga.
- 8 January – Boko Haram militants raze the entire town of Baga. Bodies lay strewn on Baga's streets with as many as 2,000 people having been killed. Boko Haram now controls 70% of the Borno State, which is the worst-affected by the insurgency.
- 9 January – Refugees flee Borno State following the Boko Haram massacre in the town of Baga. 7,300 flee to neighbouring Chad while over 1,000 are trapped on the island of Kangala in Lake Chad. Nigeria's army vows to recapture the town, while Niger and Chad withdraw their forces from a transnational force tasked with combating militants.
- 10 January – A female suicide bomber, believed to be aged around 10 years old, kills herself and 19 others, possibly against her will, at a market in the northeastern city of Maiduguri.
- 11 January – Two female suicide bombers, each believed to be around 10 years old, kill themselves and three others at a market in the northeastern city of Potiskum.
- 17 January – Following the Chad authorities decision to send troops to Nigeria and Cameroon to fight Boko Haram militants, the Russian ambassador to the country pledges to supply Cameroon with more modern weapons to combat the Islamist insurgents.
- 20 January – Boko Haram leader Abubakar Shekau claims responsibility for the attack on the town of Baga, Nigeria in which an unknown number of civilians were killed.

=== February ===
- 2 February – A female suicide bomber attacks minutes after the President leaves an election rally in the city of Gombe resulting in at least one death and 18 people injured.
- 7 February – Nigeria postpones its general election for six weeks to allow its armed forces to control parts of the country currently controlled by Boko Haram.
- 15 February – A suicide bomber kills seven and wounds 30 in the city of Damaturu.
- 16 February – Nigeria regains the key town of Monguno from Boko Haram.

=== March ===
- 7 March – A series of suicide bombings by Boko Haram in Maiduguri kills at least 54 people and wounds more than 140 others.
- 8 March – Forces from Niger and Chad launch a ground and air offensive against Boko Haram Islamist militants in northeastern Nigeria.
- 28 March – General elections are held. Gunmen kill at least 15 voters including an opposition house of assembly candidate for Dukku in Gombe.
- 29 March – Voting in the general election for a second day due to delays and malfunctioning equipment. Boko Haram attacks kill 43 people.
- 30 March – In the general election, challenger Muhammadu Buhari leads by two million votes with three-quarters of the states having their votes counted but votes from some of President Goodluck Jonathan's strongest states in the Niger Delta have yet to be counted.

=== April ===
- 1 April – Muhammadu Buhari of the All Progressives Congress is elected to be the next President of Nigeria.
- The Boko Haram insurgency was still ongoing in April 2015.
- Nigerian military forces, along with multinational efforts (with help from Chad, Niger, and Cameroon), were engaging Boko Haram in the northeast.
- There were several attacks and military operations around Borno, Yobe, and Adamawa State

== See also ==
- List of Nigerian films of 2015
