= 2005 in Nigeria =

- Decades: 1980s; 1990s; 2000s; 2010s; 2020s
- See also: Other events of 2005; Timeline of Nigerian history

This article is about the particular significance of the year 2005 to Nigeria and its people.

== Incumbents ==
=== Federal government ===
- President: Olusegun Obasanjo (PDP)
- Vice President: Atiku Abubakar (PDP)
- Senate President: Adolphus Wabara (PDP) (Until 5 April); Ken Nnamani (PDP) (Starting 5 April)
- House Speaker: Aminu Bello Masari (PDP)
- Chief Justice: Muhammad Lawal Uwais

=== Governors ===
- Abia State: Orji Uzor Kalu (PDP)
- Adamawa State: Boni Haruna (PDP)
- Akwa Ibom State: Victor Attah (PDP)
- Anambra State: Chris Ngige (PDP)
- Bauchi State: Adamu Mu'azu (PDP)
- Bayelsa State: Diepreye Alamieyeseigha (PDP)
- Benue State: George Akume (PDP)
- Borno State: Ali Modu Sheriff (ANPP)
- Cross River State: Donald Duke (PDP)
- Delta State: James Ibori (PDP)
- Ebonyi State: Sam Egwu (PDP)
- Edo State: Lucky Igbinedion (PDP)
- Ekiti State: Ayo Fayose (PDP)
- Enugu State: Chimaroke Nnamani (PDP)
- Gombe State: Mohammed Danjuma Goje (PDP)
- Imo State: Achike Udenwa (PDP)
- Jigawa State: Ibrahim Saminu Turaki (APP)
- Kaduna State: Ahmed Makarfi (PDP)
- Kano State: Ibrahim Shekarau (ANPP)
- Katsina State: Umaru Yar'Adua (PDP)
- Kebbi State: Adamu Aliero (APP)
- Kogi State: Ibrahim Idris (PDP)
- Kwara State: Bukola Saraki (PDP)
- Lagos State: Bola Tinubu (AC)
- Nasarawa State: Abdullahi Adamu (PDP)
- Niger State: Abdulkadir Kure (PDP)
- Ogun State: Gbenga Daniel (PDP)
- Ondo State: Olusegun Agagu (PDP)
- Osun State: Olagunsoye Oyinlola (PDP)
- Oyo State: Rashidi Adewolu Ladoja (PDP)
- Plateau State: Joshua Dariye (PDP)
- Rivers State: Peter Odili (PDP)
- Sokoto State: Attahiru Bafarawa (APP)
- Taraba State: Jolly Nyame (PDP)
- Yobe State: Bukar Ibrahim (APP)
- Zamfara State: Ahmad Sani Yerima (ANPP)

== Events ==
- 15 May - Murder of Alabi Hassan Olajoku
- 30 May - 1st Africa Movie Academy Awards take place in Yenagoa.
- 28 June - Air Nigeria is established.
- 10 December - Sosoliso Airlines Flight 1145 crashes at Port Harcourt International Airport.

== Deaths ==
- 31 August - Sam Okoye, football goalkeeper who represented Nigeria during the 1999 FIFA World Youth Championship born 1980.
