= 2018 in Nigeria =

- Decades: 1990s; 2000s; 2010s; 2020s
- See also: Other events of 2018; Timeline of Nigerian history

Events in the year 2018 in Nigeria.

== Incumbents ==
=== Federal government ===
- President: Muhammadu Buhari (APC)
- Vice President: Yemi Osinbajo (APC)
- Senate President: Bukola Saraki (PDP)
- House Speaker: Yakubu Dogara (PDP)
- Chief Justice: Walter Samuel Nkanu Onnoghen

=== Governors ===
- Abia State: Okezie Ikpeazu (PDP)
- Adamawa State: Bindo Jibrilla (APC)
- Akwa Ibom State: Udom Emmanuel (PDP)
- Anambra State: Willie Obiano (APGA)
- Bauchi State: M. A. Abubakar (APC)
- Bayelsa State: Henry Dickson (PDP)
- Benue State: Samuel Ortom (APC)
- Borno State: Kashim Shettima (APC)
- Cross River State: Ben Ayade (PDP)
- Delta State: Ifeanyi Okowa (PDP)
- Ebonyi State: Dave Umahi (PDP)
- Edo State: Godwin Obaseki (PDP)
- Ekiti State: Ayo Fayose (PDP) (until 16 October); Kayode Fayemi (APC) (starting 16 October)
- Enugu State: Ifeanyi Ugwuanyi (PDP)
- Gombe State: Ibrahim Dankwambo (PDP)
- Imo State: Rochas Okorocha (APC)
- Jigawa State: Badaru Abubakar (APC)
- Kaduna State: Nasir el-Rufai (APC)
- Kano State: Umar Ganduje (APC)
- Katsina State: Aminu Masari (APC)
- Kebbi State: Abubakar Atiku Bagudu (APC)
- Kogi State: Yahaya Bello (APC)
- Kwara State: Abdulfatah Ahmed (APC)
- Lagos State: Akinwumi Ambode (APC)
- Nasarawa State: Umaru Al-Makura (APC)
- Niger State: Abubakar Sani Bello (APC)
- Ogun State: Ibikunle Amosun (APC)
- Ondo State: Oluwarotimi Odunayo Akeredolu (PDP)
- Osun State: Rauf Aregbesola (APC) (until 27 November); Gboyega Oyetola (APC) (starting 27 November)
- Oyo State: Abiola Ajimobi (APC)
- Plateau State: Simon Lalong (APC)
- Rivers State: Ezenwo Nyesom Wike (PDP)
- Sokoto State: Aminu Tambuwal (APC)
- Taraba State: Darius Ishaku (PDP)
- Yobe State: Ibrahim Geida (APC)
- Zamfara State: Abdul-aziz Yari Abubakar (APC)

== Events ==
- 19 February – Dapchi schoolgirls kidnapping
- 17 September - Over 100 people are killed in floods after two major rivers burst their banks.
- 13 October - At least 30 people are killed when a pipeline caught fire and explodes in southeast Nigeria after a raid by suspected petrol thieves.

=== Scheduled ===
- Osun State gubernatorial election, 2018

== Popular culture ==
=== Sports ===
- 9 to 25 February – Nigeria participated at the 2018 Winter Olympics in PyeongChang, South Korea, with 3 competitors in 2 sports

== Deaths ==
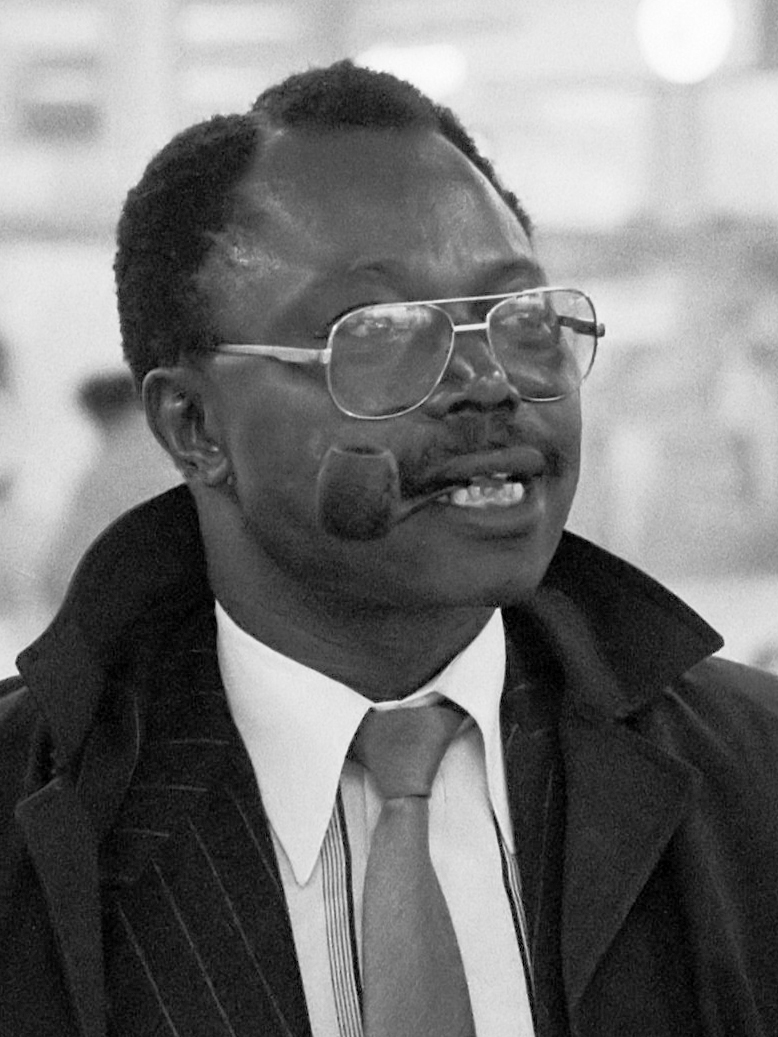
Adebayo Adedeji

- 2 January – Lawal Kaita, politician (b. 1932).
- 22 January – Dahiru Musdapher, justice (b. 1942)
- 27 February – Joseph Bagobiri, Roman Catholic Bishop (b. 1957)
- 23 March – Idowu Sofola, jurist (b. 1934).
- 25 April – Adebayo Adedeji, economist, academic, politician and diplomat (b 1930).
- 10 June – Ras Kimono, reggae musician (b. 1958).
- 18 July – A. I. Katsina-Alu, judge (b. 1941).
- 19 July – Ibrahim Coomassie, police officer (b. 1942).
- 18 August – Denis Edozie, Supreme Court judge (b. 1935).
- 28 December – Shehu Shagari, 6th President of Nigeria

== See also ==
- List of Nigerian films of 2018
