= 2011 in Nigeria =

- Decades: 1990s; 2000s; 2010s; 2020s
- See also: Other events of 2011; Timeline of Nigerian history

Events in the year 2011 in Nigeria. The year 2011 is a distinguishing year for Nigeria. The year entails several events that define the progress of the country and its future. These events include: the 2011 budget bill, the general election, and activities of the current government.

== Incumbents ==
=== Federal government ===
- President: Goodluck Jonathan (PDP)
- Vice President: Namadi Sambo (PDP)
- Senate President: David Mark (PDP)
- House Speaker: Dimeji Bankole (PDP) (Until 29 May); Aminu Waziri Tambuwal (PDP) (Starting June)
- Chief Justice: Aloysius Iyorgyer Katsina-Alu (Until 28 August); Dahiru Musdapher (Starting 29 August)

=== Governors ===
- Abia State:
- Adamawa State:
- Akwa Ibom State:
- Anambra State:
- Bauchi State:
- Bayelsa State:
- Bendel State:
- Benue State:
- Borno State:
- Cross River State:
- Delta State:
- Eastern Region:
- Ebonyi State:
- Edo State:
- Ekiti State:
- Enugu State:
- Gombe State:
- Gongola State:
- Imo State:
- Jigawa State:
- Kaduna State:
- Kano State:
- Katsina State:
- Kebbi State:
- Kogi State:
- Kwara State:
- Lagos State:
- Nasarawa State:
- Niger State:
- Ogun State:
- Ondo State:
- Osun State:
- Oyo State:
- Plateau State:
- Rivers State: Chibuike Amaechi (PDP)
- Sokoto State:
- Taraba State:
- Western State:
- Yobe State:

== Events ==
=== Budget ===
The 2011 budget was prepared by the president of the country and his executive committee. It was indeed a test of the unelected president who took over power due to the death of his predecessor Umaru Musa Yaradua, who died on 5 May 2010. The 2011 budget was the first budget that the Goodluck Jonathan administration has put together and the eyes of the entire nation are on his performance and capability, nonetheless. International organization such as the International Monetary Fund has also voiced their support with the Jonathan administration to reduce fiscal deficit for 2011 to 2013.

In December 2010, a budget of 4.236 trillion naira (18% less than 2010 budget) was prepared by the administration and was presented to the House of Representative on 15 December 2010. At the budget speech, the president of the federation called the budget; “a budget of fiscal consolidation inclusive economic growth and employment generation. The focus of this Administration is to establish and strengthen the sound macroeconomic environment that Nigeria needs to ensure the prosperity of our citizens”.

=== General election ===
A general election in 2011 is one of the events that the president has promised to deliver. He has promised a free and fair election. The election which took practically the entire month of April 2011 was credited by several international groups; the chair of the Commonwealth Observer Group commented on the election calling it, "a genuine celebration of democracy in Africa’s most populous country”.

Furthermore, the election brought a new era into the country’s history. For the first time a citizen from a minority region (South-South)of the country takes on the presidencial position after a successful election. The president (Dr Goodluck Jonathan) of the People's Democratic Party (Nigeria) (PDP) won the election as people came out massively to vote for him even in the South West part of the country. The South West region is majorly controlled by the Action Congress of Nigeria (ACN) party, one of the fastest growing political parties in the country. The success has also been accepted positively internationally in develop countries and by international investors. The general election opens several post election investment opportunities in the country.

Election in Nigeria

- April 9 - Nigerian parliamentary election, 2011
- April 16 - Nigerian presidential election, 2011

=== Government activities ===
The president and his executive team have not only delivered a free and fair election and fiscally consolidated budget, they have defended the cause of the budget. Prior to the election, on March 17, 2011 the National Assembly approved the budget with an additional 745 billion naira to the budget. The president has since the passing of the 2011 budget bill by the National Assembly refused to sign the bill into law. The bill has been sent back to the House of Representation for further review.

== Arts and entertainment ==
26 March - 7th Africa Movie Academy Awards

== Sports ==
Football (soccer) competitions: Nigeria Premier League. See also: Nigeria national football team 2011.

== Deaths ==
- 4 February: Abel Guobadia, elections administrator
- 16 March: Simeon Ekpe, Nigerian Court of Appeal justice and former Chief Judge
- 30 June: Christy Essien-Igbokwe, musician and actress
