= 2007 in Nigeria =

- Decades: 1980s; 1990s; 2000s; 2010s; 2020s
- See also: Other events of 2007; Timeline of Nigerian history

The following lists events that happened during 2007 in Nigeria.

== Incumbents ==
=== Federal government ===
- President: Olusegun Obasanjo (until 29 May), Umaru Musa Yar'Adua (starting 29 May)
- Vice President: Atiku Abubakar (until 29 May), Goodluck Jonathan (starting 29 May)
- Senate President: Ken Nnamani (Until May) David Mark (Starting June)
- House Speaker:
  - Until 29 May: Aminu Bello Masari
  - 6 June – 30 October: Patricia Etteh
  - Starting 1 November: Dimeji Bankole
- Chief Justice: Salihu Moddibo Alfa Belgore (Until January) Idris Legbo Kutigi (Starting January)

=== Governors ===
- Abia State: Orji Uzor Kalu (until 29 May), Theodore Orji (starting 29 May)
- Adamawa State: Boni Haruna (until 29 May), Murtala Nyako (starting 29 May)
- Akwa Ibom State: Victor Attah (until 29 May), Godswill Akpabio (starting 29 May)
- Anambra State: Virginia Etiaba (until 9 February), Peter Obi (starting 9 February)
- Bauchi State: Adamu Mu'azu (until 29 May), Isa Yuguda (starting 29 May)
- Bayelsa State: Goodluck Jonathan (until 29 May), Timipre Sylva (starting 29 May)
- Benue State: George Akume (until 29 May), Gabriel Suswam (starting 29 May)
- Borno State: Ali Modu Sheriff
- Cross River State: Donald Duke (until 29 May), Liyel Imoke (starting 29 May)
- Delta State: James Ibori (until 29 May), Emmanuel Uduaghan (starting 29 May)
- Ebonyi State: Sam Egwu (until 29 May), Martin Elechi (starting 29 May)
- Edo State: Lucky Igbinedion (until 29 May), Adams Aliyu Oshiomle (starting 29 May)
- Ekiti State:
  - until 27 April: Tunji Olurin
  - 27 April-29 May: Tope Ademiluyi
  - starting 29 May: Olusegun Oni
- Enugu State: Chimaroke Nnamani (until 29 May), Sullivan Chime (starting 29 May)
- Gombe State: Mohammed Danjuma Goje
- Imo State: Achike Udenwa (until 29 May), Ikedi Ohakim (starting 29 May)
- Jigawa State: Ibrahim Saminu Turaki (until 29 May), Sule Lamido (starting 29 May)
- Kaduna State: Ahmed Makarfi (until 29 May), Namadi Sambo (starting 29 May)
- Kano State: Rabiu Musa Kwankwaso (until 29 May), Ibrahim Shekarau (starting 29 May)
- Katsina State: Umaru Musa Yar'Adua (until 29 May), Ibrahim Shema (starting 29 May)
- Kebbi State: Adamu Aliero (until 29 May), Usman Saidu Nasamu Dakingari (starting 29 May)
- Kogi State: Ibrahim Idris
- Kwara State: Bukola Saraki
- Lagos State: Bola Tinubu (until 29 May), Babatunde Fashola (starting 29 May)
- Nasarawa State: Abdullahi Adamu (until 29 May), Aliyu Doma (starting 29 May)
- Niger State: Abdulkadir Kure (until 29 May), Mu'azu Babangida Aliyu (starting 29 May)
- Ogun State: Gbenga Daniel
- Ondo State: Olusegun Agagu
- Osun State: Olagunsoye Oyinlola
- Oyo State: Rashidi Adewolu Ladoja (until 29 May), Christopher Alao-Akala (starting 29 May)
- Plateau State:
  - until 27 April: Michael Botmang
  - 27 April-29 May: Joshua Dariye
  - starting 29 May: Jonah David Jang
- Rivers State:
  - until 29 May: Peter Odili
  - 29 May–25 October: Celestine Omehia
  - starting 25 October: Chibuike Amaechi
- Sokoto State: Attahiru Bafarawa (until 29 May), Aliyu Magatakarda Wamakko (starting 29 May)
- Taraba State: Jolly Nyame (until 29 May), Danbaba Suntai (starting 29 May)
- Yobe State: Ahmad Sani Yarima (until 29 May), Mahmud Shinkafi (starting 29 May)

== Events ==
=== March ===
- 27 March - More than ninety people are burnt to death after a fire following a petrol spill in Kaduna State.

=== April ===
- 4 April - Four foreign hostages held in the Niger Delta region are freed.
- 14 April - Nigerian voters go to the polls for state governor and legislative elections. Security is tight in the northern city of Kano following the murder of militant Islamic cleric Ustaz Ja'afar Adam.

=== August ===
- August - 100,000 litres of oil leaked from a Shell Oil wellhead in Ikot Ada Udo.
