= 2019 in Nigeria =

- Decades: 1990s; 2000s; 2010s; 2020s
- See also: Other events of 2019; Timeline of Nigerian history

The following lists and talks about events that happened in 2019 in Nigeria.

== Incumbents ==
=== Federal government ===
- President: Muhammadu Buhari (APC)
- Vice President: Yemi Osinbajo (APC)
- Senate President: Bukola Saraki (PDP) (Until 11 June); Ahmed Lawan (APC) (Starting 11 June)
- House Speaker: Yakubu Dogara (PDP) (Until 12 June); Femi Gbajabiamila (APC) (Starting 12 June)
- Chief Justice: Walter Samuel Nkanu Onnoghen (Until 25 January); Ibrahim Tanko Muhammad (Starting 25 January)

=== Governors ===
- Abia State: Okezie Ikpeazu (PDP)
- Adamawa State: Bindo Jibrilla (APC) (until 29 May); Ahmadu Umaru Fintiri (PDP) (starting 29 May)
- Akwa Ibom State: Udom Emmanuel (PDP)
- Anambra State: Willie Obiano (APGA)
- Bauchi State: M. A. Abubakar (APC) (until 29 May); Bala Abdulkadir Mohammed (PDP) (starting 29 May)
- Bayelsa State: Henry Dickson (PDP)
- Benue State: Samuel Ortom (APC)
- Borno State: Kashim Shettima (APC) (until 29 May); Babagana Umara Zulum (APC) (starting 29 May)
- Cross River State: Ben Ayade (PDP)
- Delta State: Ifeanyi Okowa (PDP)
- Ebonyi State: Dave Umahi (PDP)
- Edo State: Godwin Obaseki (PDP)
- Ekiti State: Kayode Fayemi (APC)
- Enugu State: Ifeanyi Ugwuanyi (PDP)
- Gombe State: Ibrahim Dankwambo (PDP) (until 29 May); Muhammad Inuwa Yahaya (APC) (starting 29 May)
- Imo State: Rochas Okorocha (APC) (until 29 May); Emeka Ihedioha (PDP) (starting 29 May)
- Jigawa State: Badaru Abubakar (APC)
- Kaduna State: Nasir el-Rufai (APC)
- Kano State: Umar Ganduje (APC)
- Katsina State: Aminu Masari (APC)
- Kebbi State: Abubakar Atiku Bagudu (APC)
- Kogi State: Yahaya Bello (APC)
- Kwara State: Abdulfatah Ahmed (APC) (until 29 May); Abdulrazaq Abdulrahman (APC) (starting 29 May)
- Lagos State: Akinwumi Ambode (APC) (until 29 May); Babajide Sanwo-Olu (APC) (starting 29 May)
- Nasarawa State: Umaru Al-Makura (APC) (until 29 May); Abdullahi Sule (APC) (starting 29 May)
- Niger State: Abubakar Sani Bello (APC)
- Ogun State: Ibikunle Amosun (APC) (until 29 May); Dapo Abiodun (APC) (starting 29 May)
- Ondo State: Oluwarotimi Odunayo Akeredolu (PDP)
- Osun State: Gboyega Oyetola (APC)
- Oyo State: Abiola Ajimobi (APC) (Until 29 May) Seyi Makinde (PDP) (Starting 29 May)
- Plateau State: Simon Lalong (APC)
- Rivers State: Ezenwo Nyesom Wike (PDP)
- Sokoto State: Aminu Tambuwal (APC)
- Taraba State: Darius Ishaku (PDP)
- Yobe State: Ibrahim Geida (APC) (Until 29 May) Mai Mala Buni (APC) (Starting 29 May)
- Zamfara State: Abdul-aziz Yari Abubakar (APC) (Until 29 May) Bello Matawalle (PDP) (Starting 29 May)

== Events ==
=== February ===
- 10-11: 2019 Kaduna State massacre.
- 2019 Nigerian general election was on 16 February 2019 to elect the President and the National Assembly. They were the sixth quadrennial elections since the end of military rule in 1999. Presidential primaries are likely to be held during the last six months of 2018.
- The elections were delayed by one week.
- 2019 Nigerian general election: General elections were held in Nigeria on 23 February 2019 to elect the President, Vice President, House of Representatives and the Senate. The elections had initially been scheduled for 16 February, but the Electoral Commission postponed the vote by a week at 03:00 on the original polling day, citing logistical challenges in getting electoral materials to polling stations on time. In some places, the vote was delayed until 24 February due to electoral violence. Polling in some areas was subsequently delayed until 9 March, when voting was carried out alongside gubernatorial and state assembly elections.

=== May ===
President Muhammadu Buhari was inaugurated.

=== September ===
September 30 — Police rescued women in Lagos who were forced to sell babies.

=== December ===
- December 13 - Action Against Hunger says four of six aid workers held by ISIL in the Islamic State's Central Africa Province since July have been killed.
- December 18 − Citizens express alarm over new social media bill.
- December 27 – Islamic State of Iraq and the Levant (ISIL)-linked propaganda arm Amaq releases a video showing the execution of 11 Christians.

The security and humanitarian situation in Nigeria remained fragile and precarious, especially North-East Nigeria. According to the 2019 Global Risk Index, Nigeria ranked the highest in the overall projected risk in socio-economic vulnerability, inequality and food insecurity. Although the presidential and State elections held in March 2019 were largely peaceful (with the incumbent president re-elected), transition at the Federal and State levels, affected the pace of humanitarian activities, especially those that required high level engagements with the Government.

== See also ==
- List of Nigerian films of 2019
- Nigerian general election, 2019
