= 2006 in Nigeria =

- Decades: 1980s; 1990s; 2000s; 2010s; 2020s
- See also: Other events of 2006; Timeline of Nigerian history

This article is about the particular significance of the year 2006 to Nigeria and its people. See also Timeline of Nigerian history

== Incumbents ==
=== Federal government ===
- President: Olusegun Obasanjo (PDP)
- Vice President: Atiku Abubakar (PDP)
- Senate President: Ken Nnamani (PDP)
- House Speaker: Aminu Bello Masari (PDP)
- Chief Justice: Muhammad Lawal Uwais (Until June) Salihu Moddibo Alfa Belgore (Starting July)

=== Governors ===
- Abia State:
- Adamawa State:
- Akwa Ibom State:
- Anambra State:
- Bauchi State:
- Bayelsa State:
- Bendel State:
- Benue State:
- Borno State:
- Cross River State:
- Delta State:
- Eastern Region:
- Ebonyi State:
- Edo State:
- Ekiti State:
- Enugu State:
- Gombe State:
- Gongola State:
- Imo State:
- Jigawa State:
- Kaduna State:
- Kano State:
- Katsina State:
- Kebbi State:
- Kogi State:
- Kwara State:
- Lagos State:
- Nasarawa State:
- Niger State:
- Ogun State:
- Ondo State:
- Osun State:
- Oyo State:
- Plateau State:
- Rivers State: Peter Odili (PDP)
- Sokoto State:
- Taraba State:
- Western State:
- Yobe State:

== Events ==
=== January ===
- January 25 - Nigerian militants attack the industrial facility of a subsidiary of the Italian oil giant, Nigerian Agip Oil Company in Port Harcourt killing eight policemen and a civilian worker.

=== February ===
- February 9 - A large-scale slaughter is planned at a Nigerian farm where thousands of chickens have died from bird flu.
- February 18 - Sixteen people are killed in northern Nigeria as demonstrators protest the Jyllands-Posten Muhammad cartoons by storming and burning Christian churches and businesses.

=== March ===
- March - Nigeria was represented at the 2006 Commonwealth Games in Melbourne, Victoria, Australia.
- March 22 - The top nine floors of the Nigerian Investment Development Bank in Lagos collapse during a thunderstorm, killing at least one and injuring several others.
- March 25 - Nigerian President Olusegun Obasanjo announced he would allow former Liberian leader Charles Taylor to be extradited to Liberia, where he is wanted for numerous crimes.

=== April ===
- April 9 - Nigerian President Obasanjo and the Republic of the Congo president Denis Sassou-Nguesso host talks in Abuja between the rival groups in Darfur hoping to accelerate the peace process. Sudanese attendees include Vice President Ali Osman Mohamed Taha, Minni Arcua Minnawi head of the most powerful faction of the divided Sudan Liberation Army, and Khalil Ibrahim, leader of the smaller Justice and Equality Movement.

=== May ===
- May 12 - A pipeline explosion on the outskirts of Lagos kills about 100 people. Vandals were tapping into the pipeline to steal oil when the blast erupted.
- May 16 - The National Assembly of Nigeria votes against a constitutional amendment to remove term limits; President Obasanjo is prevented from contesting a third term in office.

=== June ===
- June 13 - President Olusegun Obasanjo meets with his Cameroonian counterpart Paul Biya, and UN Secretary General, Kofi Annan in New York City to resolve dispute talks over Bakassi.

=== July ===
- July 8 - The Nigerian government announces it will lay off over 33,000 of 160,000 civil servants before 2007.

=== August ===
- August 1 - Nigerian troops begin to pull out of Bakassi.

=== September ===
- September 30 - The collapse of the Gusau Dam kills six people in Zamfara.
