= 2010 in Nigeria =

- Decades: 1990s; 2000s; 2010s; 2020s
- See also: Other events of 2010; Timeline of Nigerian history

Events in the year 2010 in Nigeria.

== Incumbents ==
=== Federal government ===
- President: Umaru Musa Yar'Adua (until 5 May), Goodluck Jonathan (starting 5 May)
- Vice President:
  - Until 5 May: Goodluck Jonathan
  - 5 May – 19 May: vacant
  - Starting 19 May: Namadi Sambo
- Senate President: David Mark
- House Speaker: Dimeji Bankole
- Chief Justice: Aloysius Iyorgyer Katsina-Alu

=== Governors ===
- Abia State: Theodore Orji (PDP)
- Adamawa State: Murtala Nyako (PDP)
- Akwa Ibom State: Godswill Akpabio (PDP)
- Anambra State: Peter Obi (APGA)
- Bauchi State: Isa Yuguda (ANPP)
- Bayelsa State: Timipre Sylva (PDP)
- Benue State: Gabriel Suswam (PDP)
- Borno State: Ali Modu Sheriff (ANPP)
- Cross River State: Liyel Imoke (PDP)
- Delta State: Emmanuel Uduaghan (PDP)
- Ebonyi State: Martin Elechi (PDP)
- Edo State: Adams Aliyu Oshiomole (AC)
- Ekiti State: Kayode Fayemi (AC)
- Enugu State: Sullivan Chime (PDP)
- Gombe State: Mohammed Danjuma Goje (PDP)
- Imo State: Ikedi Ohakim (PDP)
- Jigawa State: Sule Lamido (PDP)
- Kaduna State: Patrick Ibrahim Yakowa (PDP)
- Kano State: Ibrahim Shekarau (ANPP)
- Katsina State: Ibrahim Shema (PDP)
- Kebbi State: Usman Saidu Nasamu Dakingari (PDP)
- Kogi State: Ibrahim Idris (PDP)
- Kwara State: Bukola Saraki (AC)
- Lagos State: Babatunde Fashola (AC)
- Nasarawa State: Aliyu Doma (PDP)
- Niger State: Mu'azu Babangida Aliyu (PDP)
- Ogun State: Gbenga Daniel (PDP)
- Ondo State: Olusegun Mimiko (LP)
- Osun State: Rauf Aregbesola (AC)
- Oyo State: Christopher Alao-Akala (PDP)
- Plateau State: Jonah David Jang (PDP)
- Rivers State: Chibuike Amaechi (PDP)
- Sokoto State: Aliyu Magatakarda Wamakko (PDP)
- Taraba State: Danbaba Suntai (PDP)
- Yobe State: Ibrahim Gaidam (ANPP)
- Zamfara State: Mahmud Shinkafi (PDP)

== Events ==
- 5 May – President Umaru Musa Yar'Adua dies of Pericarditis, and is succeeded by Vice President Goodluck Jonathan.
