= 2017 in Nigeria =

- Decades: 1990s; 2000s; 2010s; 2020s
- See also: Other events of 2017; Timeline of Nigerian history

Events in the year 2017 in Nigeria.

== Incumbents ==
=== Federal government ===
- President: Muhammadu Buhari (APC)
- Vice President: Yemi Osinbajo (APC)
- Senate President: Bukola Saraki (APC)
- House Speaker: Yakubu Dogara (APC)
- Chief Justice: Walter Samuel Nkanu Onnoghen (Starting 7 March)

=== Governors ===
- Abia State: Okezie Ikpeazu (PDP)
- Adamawa State: Bindo Jibrilla (APC)
- Akwa Ibom State: Udom Emmanuel (PDP)
- Anambra State: Willie Obiano (APGA)
- Bauchi State: M. A. Abubakar (APC)
- Bayelsa State: Henry Dickson (PDP)
- Benue State: Samuel Ortom (APC)
- Borno State: Kashim Shettima (APC)
- Cross River State: Ben Ayade (PDP)
- Delta State: Ifeanyi Okowa (PDP)
- Ebonyi State: Dave Umahi (PDP)
- Edo State: Godwin Obaseki (PDP)
- Ekiti State: Ayo Fayose (PDP)
- Enugu State: Ifeanyi Ugwuanyi (PDP)
- Gombe State: Ibrahim Dankwambo (PDP)
- Imo State: Rochas Okorocha (APC)
- Jigawa State: Badaru Abubakar (APC)
- Kaduna State: Nasir el-Rufai (APC)
- Kano State: Umar Ganduje (APC)
- Katsina State: Aminu Masari (APC)
- Kebbi State: Abubakar Atiku Bagudu (APC)
- Kogi State: Yahaya Bello (APC)
- Kwara State: Abdulfatah Ahmed (APC)
- Lagos State: Akinwumi Ambode (APC)
- Nasarawa State: Umaru Al-Makura (APC)
- Niger State: Abubakar Sani Bello (APC)
- Ogun State: Ibikunle Amosun (APC)
- Ondo State: Olusegun Mimiko (LP) (until 24 February); Rotimi Akeredolu (APC) (starting 24 February)
- Osun State: Rauf Aregbesola (APC)
- Oyo State: Abiola Ajimobi (APC)
- Plateau State: Simon Lalong (APC)
- Rivers State: Ezenwo Nyesom Wike (PDP)
- Sokoto State: Aminu Tambuwal (APC)
- Taraba State: Darius Ishaku (PDP)
- Yobe State: Ibrahim Geida (APC)
- Zamfara State: Abdul-aziz Yari Abubakar (APC)

== Events ==
- 13 January – Governor Ezenwo Nyesom Wike of Rivers State signs ₦470 billion budget into law.
- 17 January – Rann bombing, resulting in 115 deaths according to official sources.

== Deaths ==
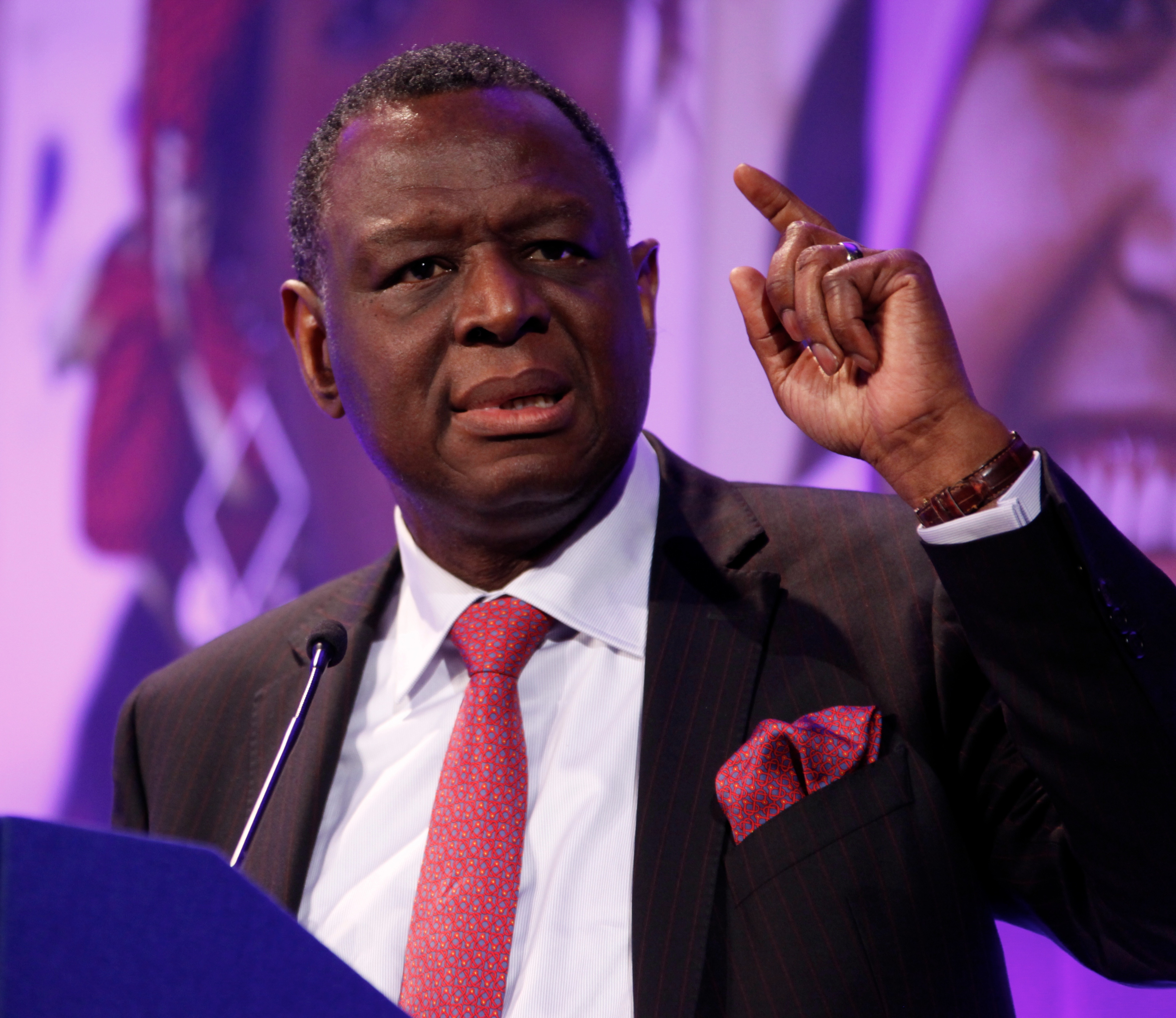
Babatunde Osotimehin

- 8 January – Abdulkadir Kure, politician (b. 1956)
- 16 January – William Onyeabor, singer-songwriter (b. 1946)
- 28 January – Mohammed Bello Abubakar, Muslim preacher and polygamist (b. 1924)
- 26 April – Babalola Borishade, politician (b. 1946)
- 4 June – Babatunde Osotimehin, physician and politician (b. 1949)
- 21 June – Kelechi Emeteole, footballer (b. 1951)
- 11 August – Segun Bucknor, musician and journalist (b. 1946)

== See also ==
- List of Nigerian films of 2017
