= 2013 in Nigeria =

- Decades: 1990s; 2000s; 2010s; 2020s
- See also: Other events of 2013; Timeline of Nigerian history

The following lists events that happened in 2013 in Nigeria.

== Incumbents ==
=== Federal government ===
- President: Goodluck Jonathan (PDP)
- Vice President: Namadi Sambo (PDP)
- Senate President: David Mark (PDP)
- House Speaker: Aminu Waziri Tambuwal (PDP)
- Chief Justice: Aloma Mariam Mukhtar

=== Governors ===
- Rivers State: Chibuike Amaechi (PDP)

== Events ==
=== January ===
- 1 January - Nigeria's army kill 13 members of the Islamist militant group Boko Haram and lose one soldier in a gun battle in Maiduguri.
- 4 January - The Nigerian police announces that Hyundai has paid a ransom of £118,000 ($190,000) to free 6 kidnapped workers in the Niger Delta region.
- 9 January - Government troops clashed with MEND militants in the state of Ogun, resulting in the deaths of 40 civilians, seven militants, and three government soldiers.
- 19 January - A military convoy of buses carrying Nigerian troops to be deployed to the Economic Community of West African States (ECOWAS) forces in Mali were bombed by improvised explosive devices (IEDs) placed in the road near Lokoja in Kogi state. Seven soldiers were killed and dozens were wounded in the attack.
- 19 January - The Emir of Kano, Ado Bayero who was also a vocal critic of the terrorist group Boko Haram and strongly opposed their campaign against western education survived an attack led by armed men on motorcycles. At that time he was inside a motorcade, four people were killed, including the Emir's driver who tried to protect him and two bodyguards and several more were wounded.
- 21 January - A South African court convicted Henry Okah of 13 charges of terrorism, including bombings that killed 12 people in Abuja over October 2010 Abuja bombings.
- 23 January - Gunmen from the Islamist extremist group Boko Haram open fire at a market in Damboa, killing 18 people. Five people were also killed in Maiduguri by members of the Islamist sect Boko Haram.
- 30 January - A Dutch court rules that Royal Dutch Shell can be held "partially" responsible for pollution in the Niger Delta in southern Nigeria.

=== February ===
- 1 February - The Nigerian Army suspected terrorist camp used by Boko Haram resulting in the deaths of 17 militants and one government soldier and capturing large amounts ammunition, guns and weapons.
- 5 February - MEND militants attacked an oil barge in the Niger Delta resulting in the deaths of four foreign oil workers.
- 6 February - The All Progressives Congress (APC) was founded from a merger of Nigeria's three largest opposition parties - the Action Congress of Nigeria (ACN), the Congress for Progressive Change (CPC), the All Nigeria Peoples Party (ANPP), a faction of the All Progressives Grand Alliance (APGA) and the new PDP - a faction of then ruling People's Democratic Party.
- 8 February - Nine women and one man are shot to death in Kano. According to reports, all of them were involved in a polio vaccination policy and were most probably killed by the Islamist movement Boko Haram, which has previously threatened to target those involved in vaccinations.
- 10 February - Nigeria wins the 2013 Africa Cup of Nations after defeating Burkina Faso 1–0 in South Africa winning the Africa Cup of Nations for the third time.
- 10 February - Suspected Boko Haram militants kill three doctors in the northeastern Nigerian region of Yobe. Their nationality is disputed, with reports suggesting they are South Korean, North Korean or Chinese.
- 17 February - Six foreign workers, which includes one Italian, one Greek and two Lebanese, are kidnapped in a construction site belonging to Lebanese company Setraco and one security guard is killed.
- 17 February - Two BH gunmen and two civilians are killed in a shootout between gunmen and soldiers at a checkpoint in Nigeria's northern city of Kano. A first contingent of 80 Nigerian troops departs for Mali as part of a UN-mandated African force to help the country battle Islamists who are believed to have forged a close alliance with BH.
- 19 February - Seven French tourists were kidnapped by gunmen near Waza National Park in Northern Cameroon, near the border with Nigeria. President of France François Hollande states that the Islamist group Boko Haram may be responsible.
- 23 February - The Lagos State Government forcibly evicted approximately 9,000 residents of the Badia East slum.
- 24 February - The People's Democratic Party (PDP) set up its own Governors' Forum to counter the growing influence of the Nigeria Governors’ Forum, which had become critical of President Jonathan.
- 24 February - At least six people die in an attack in Ngalda, Yobe State.
- 26 February - Gunmen kill seven guards guarding a marketplace in Yobe State.
- 26 February - Nigerian troops kill a suspected BH commander and three of his lieutenants during an operation in Maiduguri. France's defence minister rules out talks with the abductors of a French family seized in Cameroon, after a video of the hostages appears on YouTube.
- 28 February - Three people, including a soldier, are injured in multiple blasts in three areas of Maiduguri, with one targeting a military patrol vehicle. Gunmen storm a residence housing foreign workers in Tella Village, in central Taraba State, killing two police guards in a failed kidnapping.

=== March ===
- 3 March - Government troops killed 20 Boko Haram militants in the village of Monguno in the state of Borno.
- 5 March - Gunmen killed 8 people in an attack on a police station and a bank in northeastern Nigeria.
- 10 March - Nigerian militants belonging to Ansaru claimed the responsibility to kidnapping and killing Italian, Greek, and British construction workers in Northern Nigeria.
- 12 March - Men on motorbikes storm a primary school and open fire wounding four teachers.
- 15 March - Gunmen kill a senior judicial official in northern Nigeria's largest city, Kano.
- 16 March - Gunmen raid a prison in Gwoza, in northeastern Borno State, freeing 170 inmates and killing a civilian.
- 18 March - Boko Haram militants killed at least 22 individuals in a suicide car bombing of a bus station in Kano.
- 21 March - At least 45 people drown and 60 are missing after a boat carrying Nigerian migrants capsizes and sinks off shore from Libreville, Gabon.
- 22 March - 25 people were killed in northeastern Adamawa State when attackers blast a jail, a police station and a bank with bombs, machine-guns and rocket-propelled grenades. Some 127 prison inmates escape during an attack on the jailhouse in Ganye town.
- 26 March - A court in South Africa sentences Nigerian militant Henry Okah to 24 years' imprisonment for his involvement in the October 2010 Abuja bombings which killed at least 12 people.
- 31 March - The Nigerian Army kills 14 suspected Boko Haram members in a raid on a building, with the death of one soldier and the capture of a potential suicide bomber in a car full of explosives in the northern city of Kano.

=== April ===
- 6 April - MEND militants killed twelve government policemen in the state of Bayelsa.
- 11 April - Four policemen and five Boko Haram gunmen are killed in a shootout during an attack on a police station in Babban Gida Village of Yobe State.
- 16 April - A clash between Boko Haram and Nigerian soldiers in the town of Baga led 187 people killed and more than 2,000 homes were destroyed concluding a massacre. The Nigerian military was accused of excessive force, but it claimed that Boko Haram fighters used civilians as human shields.
- 18 April - Omotola Jalade-Ekeinde was included in Time magazine's list of the 100 most influential people in the world.
- 20 April - Nigeria's Blessing Okagbare has posted the fifth best women's 200m time of 22.31 in 2013 (wind +1.3m/sec) at the Mount SAC Relays on Saturday in Los Angeles, California.
- 24 April - The Nigerian Senate and House of Representatives called for investigations into the Baga massacre and human rights violations by security forces. Human Rights Watch and Amnesty International condemned the violence.

=== May ===
- 3 May - A former Nigerian oil minister, Ali Monguno, was kidnapped by gunmen who storm his vehicle outside a mosque in the restive city of Maiduguri.
- 7 May - Boko Haram launched coordinated attacks in a prison located in the northeastern town of Bama against security formations, killing 55 people and freeing 105 inmates.
- 14 May - Nigerian President Goodluck Jonathan declared a state of emergency in Borno, Yobe and Adamawa in northeastern Nigeria due to escalating Boko Haram insurgency.
- 15 May - Nigerian troops launched "Operation Restore Order" in the northeast. Communication networks were cut off in several areas. Reports emerged of human rights violations by the military, including mass arrests and destruction of villages.
- 16 May - Nigeria's military announced a "massive" troops deployment and military hardware to its restive northeast, after the president declared a state of emergency in areas where Islamist insurgents have seized territory. Phone signals were shut down in Borno and Yobe states.
- 18 May - The Nigerian Military announced it had destroyed several Boko Haram camps and killed or arrested dozens of surgents. Journalists and human rights groups were restricted from entering conflict zones.
- 20 May - 120 militant Islamists have been arrested in Maiduguri, as they were organising the burial of a commander, an army spokesman has said.
- 20 May - 33,163 students in some regions were without access to schooling or forced to relocate to host communities to pursue their studies.
- 20 May – 30 June - 20,000 to 30,000 civilians were forced to flee their homes due to gun battles, aerial bombardments, and the fear of being caught in crossfire.

=== June ===
- 1 June - Forbes rates Aliko Dangote as "Africa's First $20 Billion Man".
- 11 June - BH gunmen disguised as mourners kill 15 residents of the Hausari area of Maiduguri in a fake funeral, a reprisal for the arrest of a sect member the previous day. The attack prompts the spontaneous formation youth vigilante groups fighting BH, forcing the insurgents to flee.
- 12 June - Nigerians marked the 20th anniversary of the 12 June 1993 presidential election, widely regarded as the freest and fairest election in Nigeria's history, won by Chief Moshood Abiola but annulled by the military. Prominent figures like Nobel Laureate Wole Soyinka called for 12 June to be recognized as Democracy Day instead of 29 May.
- 13 June - NANS Senate President, Donald Onukaogu, and a 4 others officials died in an auto crash on their way to Uyo, Akwa Ibom State.
- 16 June - Boko Haram Militants attacked the Government Secondary School in Damaturu, killing at least 13 students and teachers. Dormitories were set on fire, and survivors reported being shot at while fleeing.
- 17 June - Nigeria's national football team beat Tahiti 6–1.
- 19 June - Suspected Boko Haram gunmen stormed a school, killing 9 students and teachers in Maiduguri. The attackers opened fire during an examination session, the second targeted attack on students in recent days and part of the group's wider campaign against western education.
- 19 June - The Minister of Communication Technology, Omobola Johnson, said that the Federal Government would launch its Fibre-optic Research and Education Network, connecting 27 universities to the Internet by July.
- 30 June - Nigerian rapper, Ice Prince Zamani on Sunday bagged BET’s Best International Act: Africa award at the ceremony which took place in Los Angeles.
- 30 June - About 175 inmates have reportedly escaped from Akure Olokuta Prison in Ondo State, following a jail break which occurred this morning.

=== July ===
- 1 July - Mosunmola ‘Mo’ Abudu launched, on DStv, EbonyLife TV, Africa's first Global Black Multi-Broadcast Entertainment Network that has aired in many African countries, the UK and the Caribbean with programmes showcasing Nigeria's burgeoning middle class.
- 1 July - The Academic Staff Union of Universities (ASUU) began a nationwide strike which lasted 5 months and 15 days until December 2013.
- 5 July - Blessing Okagbare has won the women's long jump event at the IAAF diamond league grand prix in Lausanne's athletissima.
- 6 July - Boko Haram militants attacked the Government Secondary School in Mamudo, killing at least 42 students and staff and injuring several others. The attackers shot indiscriminately, ignited dormitories, and used explosives carrying out a massacre.
- 6 July - Ezinne Akudo won Miss Nigeria 2013.
- 8 July - Two Nigerian politicians have died during an attack on a funeral for victims of Christian communal violence that led to at least 37 deaths on Saturday in Plateau State.
- 15 July – 7 August - Heavy rains affected 35,026 people across the country according to National Emergency Management Agency (NEMA).
- 18 July - Nigeria announced plans to withdraw some of its 1,200 soldiers from the UN peacekeeping force in Mali to focus on tackling militant Islamists at home, particularly Boko Haram insurgents in northeast Nigeria.
- 19 July - Nigeria is about to emerge as the largest economy in Africa. GDP is a powerful political tool as the most important global governance institutions, from the G8 to the G20.
- 20 July - Campaigners protested against underage marriages in Lagos demanding the Parliament to legislate against child marriages following a row over contradictory laws about the issue in the country.
- 20 July - Blessing Okagbare won the Long Jump event in the Herculis 2013 Diamond League in Monaco at the weekend.
- 21 July - A British national kidnapped in Lagos on Friday has been released, the British High Commission says. The man was released on Sunday, two days after he had been seized outside Lagos airport, following his arrival in the country.
- 24 July - Michael Ikpoki, former CEO of MTN Ghana has been named as the new chief executive officer of MTN Nigeria.
- 27 July - Boko Haram carried out another brutal attack, this time in the town of Baga, resulting in approximately 20 deaths among residents and soldiers during intensified fighting in the region.
- 29 July - Four bomb blasts targeting two open beer gardens rip through the mainly Christian Sabon Gari area of Kano, killing 24 people and shattering a months-long lull in insurgent attacks.
- 31 July - The All Progressives Congress (APC) was officially registered as a political party by INEC.

=== August ===
- 4 August - The military in Borno State says 32 BH gunmen, including Shekau’s deputy, two soldiers and a policeman, were killed and two soldiers are injured in two separate BH attacks on a police base in Bama town and a multi-national military checkpoint in Malam Fatori town, both in Borno State. Four all-terrain vehicles, guns, explosives, ammunitions and rocket launchers are recovered from the insurgents.
- 11 August - Boko Haram killed approximately 44 people praying at a mosque in Konduga, Borno State.
- 16 August - BH gunmen open fire on civilians and a police station in Konduga, killing 12 people.
- 19 August - The Federal Government reported it earned ₦ 3.81 trillion from oil revenue in the first half of 2013. This figure represented 86.7% of all federally-collected revenue, with ₦ 690.42 billion earned in June alone, signaling robust state finances at the time.
- 19 August - Jihadists from Boko Haram attacked the village of Dumba, Borno State killing 35 people and injuring 14 more. The massacre was reportedly in retaliation for the community forming a self-defense group against the extremists.
- 21 August - Seven BH insurgents and two policemen were killed in shootout following an attack on a police station in the town of Gwoza, Borno State. BH gunmen kill four residents and injure eight others in an attack on Gamboru Ngala town on the border with Cameroon.
- 23 August - Nigeria says it has deported some 22,000 improperly documented or undocumented immigrants from neighbouring Niger, Chad and Cameroon over two months as part of a crackdown linked to its fight against the BH insurgency.
- 26 August - Inuwa Abdul-Kadir was removed from office by President Goodluck Jonathan amid tensions related to youth mobilization and internal political disputes.
- 31 August - BH gunmen kill 12 nomads who storm Boko Haram's hideout to avenge the killing of two herders killed by the insurgents following a previous attack on Yaguwa Village in Damboa District of Borno State.
- 31 August - BH gunmen disguised as soldiers shoot dead 24 vigilantes, who were combing Monguno Forest in Borno State in search of the insurgents that were later subsequently carrying out the ambush.

=== September ===
- 4 September - Boko Haram militants killed 15 individuals in the town of Gajiram and five individuals in the village of Bulabilin Ngaura in the state of Borno.
- 6 September - Government troops killed 50 Boko Haram militants in the state of Borno.
- 11 September - Amid growing security and political pressure, President Goodluck Jonathan removed several ministers, including:
  - Shamsudeen Usman – Minister of National Planning
  - Olugbenga Ashiru - Minister of Foreign Affairs
  - Ruqayyatu "Ruqayyah" Rufai – Minister of Education
  - Amal Pepple – Minister of Lands, Housing & Urban Development
  - Hadiza Mailafia – Minister of Environment
  - Ita Okon Bassey Ewa – Minister of Science & Technology
  - Erelu Olusola Obada – Minister of State for Defence
  - Zainab Ibrahim Kuchi – Minister of State for Power
  - Bukar Tijani – Minister of State for Agriculture.
- 17 September - Boko Haram militants killed at least 143 individuals on the road between Maiduguri and Damaturu in the state of Borno carrying out a massacre.
- 20 September - Government security forces clashed with suspected Boko Haram militants in Abuja resulting in the deaths of at least seven individuals.
- 22–30 September - Inflation declined to 7.8 percent from 12 percent at end 2012, in part owing to lower food prices and monetary policy implemented by the Central Bank of Nigeria (CBN). The exchange rate has been stable, and the banking sector was well capitalized with low levels of non-performing loans. Real GDP grew by 6.8 percent in the third quarter of 2013, supported by robust performances in agriculture, services, and trade.
- 23 September - President Goodluck Jonathan organized a high-profile meeting with investors in agriculture, power, and infrastructure at the New York Stock Exchange.
- 23 September - Under Secretary of State Wendy Sherman told Nigerian media that President Goodluck Jonathan and President Barack Obama would meet in Washington, D.C on the margins of the UN General Assembly.
- 28 September - At least 44 students were killed, many of whom were Muslims, in the agriculture college in Gujba, Yobe, by Boko Haram gunmen who deliberately caused a massacre. A witness quoted by Reuters news agency counted 40 bodies at the hospital. College provost Molima Idi Mato, speaking to Associated Press added that security forces were still recovering the bodies and that about 1,000 students had fled the campus.

=== October ===
- 3 October - 13 people have died after a charter plane suffered engine failure and crash-landed at Lagos airport in Nigeria shortly after take-off. A flight that was carrying the corpse of former Ondo governor Olusegun Agagu.
- 6 October - The Battle of Damboa occurs between 7th Division of Nigerian military and Boko Haram insurgents.
- 20 October - Boko Haram militants killed 19 individuals near the town of Logumani in the state of Borno.
- 24 October - BH gunmen in military uniform launch coordinated attacks on a military barracks and four police facilities in Yobe State capital Damaturu. Scores are killed, including 35 men in army uniform. It is not clear if the 35 are BH gunmen or Nigerian soldiers.
- 25 October - The Nigerian military says air and ground attack on rebel camps in Borno state has left at least 74 Boko Haram fighters dead.
- 31 October - BH gunmen kill 13 passengers in an ambush on a commercial bus in Bama District.

=== November ===
- 2 November - Gunmen attacked a convoy returning from a wedding, killing over 30 people in Borno.
- 4 November - Dozens of BH gunmen on motorcycles and in pickups kill 27 people and burn down 300 homes in a raid on Bama, a town in northeast Borno State. Twelve people are injured in the raid, according to a local official.
- 6 November - President Goodluck Jonathan of Nigeria has asked the National Assembly to approve another six months of emergency rule in three north-east states worst hit by Boko Haram violence.
- 8 November - Nigeria beat Mexico 3–0 in the 2013 Under-17 World Cup final in the UAE on Friday to win the tournament for a record fourth time.
- 12 November - The U.S. designates Boko Haram and Ansaru as terrorist organizations.
- 15 November - Nigerian troops kill nine BH members in a gunfight in the Damboa area of Borno State, near the border with Cameroon; a soldier is injured in the incident. Soldiers destroy two BH vans and recover ammunitions in the attack. A BH source confirms the group is behind the kidnap of a French priest in Cameroon, near the border with Nigeria.
- 16 November - Nigeria became the first African nation to qualify for the 2014 World Cup after beating Ethiopia 2–0 in Calabar.
- 19–24 November - The first edition of the Aké Arts and Book Festival held in the Cultural Centre in Kuto, Abeokuta has started marking its foundation that was initiated by Lola Shoneyin.
- 23 November - BH gunmen kill 12 residents, burn several homes and steal vehicles in an attack on Sandiya Village, 85 km outside Maiduguri. Over 40 Boko Haram members were killed in an offensive by the military.
- 27 November - Over 40 insurgents were killed as offensive military operatives attacked targeted terrorist camps near Gwoza military sources have said.

=== December ===
- 2 December - Around 200 insurgents dressed in military uniform and armed with rocket launchers, explosives and assault rifles infiltrated Maiduguri and conducted coordinated attacks on the air force base and a military barracks. Most of the buildings were reportedly destroyed, as well as five aircraft.
- 5–15 December - The first-ever National Youth Games were held in Abuja, featuring over 4,000 athletes nationwide.
- 14 December - CBN Governor Sanusi Lamido Sanusi accuses the NNPC of failing to remit $49 billion in oil revenue to the federation account, causing major controversy.
- 20 December - Several hundred fighters stormed military barracks outside Bama, close to the Cameroon border, in a predawn raid, torching the compound and killing many soldiers, their wives and children. The army said the Islamists tried to escape across the border, but fighter jets killed many of them, as well as civilians.
- 26 December - The Headies 2013, 8ʰ edition of Nigeria's prominent music awards was held at the Oriental Hotel in Victoria Island. Hosted by Tiwa Savage and Dr SID, the ceremony spotlighted artists like:
  - Olamide – topped nominations (7) and took home three awards
  - Phyno – won Best Rap Single (“Man of the Year”)
  - Sean Tizzle – crowned Next Rated, receiving a Hyundai Tucson
  - Davido – earned Best R&B/Pop Album ("Omo Baba Olowo")
- 30 December - The Kaduna Sector Command of the Federal Road Safety Corps (FRSC) said 24 people were killed in 28 road crashes recorded in the state during Yuletide.
- 30 December - Nigerian military kills 63 Boko Haram suspects in separate attacks in Borno, Lake Chad area to ensure peaceful Christmas and New Year celebration.

== Deaths ==
- 14 February - Goldie Harvey
- 14 February - Lugard Onoyemu
- 15 February - Collins Ifeanyichukwu
- 19 February - Justus Esiri
- 21 March - Chinua Achebe
- 9 June - Solomon Oboh
- 11 June - Benedict Odiase
- 12 June - Fatai Rolling Dollar
- 13 June - Donald Onukaogu
- 17 June - Albert Legogie
- 6 July - Tony Umole
- 13 September - Olusegun Agagu
- 30 September - Flavian Okojie
- 25 October - Ray Daniels Okeugo
- 2 November - Pa Ola Ogungbe
- 5 November - Falilat Okerede Oketay
- 17 November - Father U-Turn
