= 2012 in Nigeria =

- Decades: 1990s; 2000s; 2010s; 2020s
- See also: Other events of 2012; Timeline of Nigerian history

The following lists events that happened during 2012 in Nigeria.

== Incumbents ==
=== Federal government ===
- President: Goodluck Jonathan (PDP)
- Vice President: Namadi Sambo (PDP)
- Senate President: David Mark (PDP)
- House Speaker: Aminu Waziri Tambuwal (PDP)
- Chief Justice: Dahiru Musdapher (Until 16 July); Aloma Mariam Mukhtar (Starting 16 July)

=== Governors ===
- Abia State:
- Adamawa State:
- Akwa Ibom State:
- Anambra State:
- Bauchi State:
- Bayelsa State:
- Bendel State:
- Benue State:
- Borno State:
- Cross River State:
- Delta State:
- Eastern Region:
- Ebonyi State:
- Edo State:
- Ekiti State:
- Enugu State:
- Gombe State:
- Gongola State:
- Imo State:
- Jigawa State:
- Kaduna State:
- Kano State:
- Katsina State:
- Kebbi State:
- Kogi State:
- Kwara State:
- Lagos State:
- Nasarawa State:
- Niger State:
- Ogun State:
- Ondo State:
- Osun State:
- Oyo State:
- Plateau State:
- Rivers State: Chibuike Amaechi (PDP)
- Sokoto State:
- Taraba State:
- Western State:
- Yobe State:

== Events ==
=== January ===
- January 1 - Nigerian President Goodluck Jonathan declares a state of emergency in parts of the country hit by violence by Islamist militant group Boko Haram.
- January 1 - Nigeria announces an end to its fuel subsidy scheme leading the Nigeria Labour Congress to call for strikes and street protests.
- January 2 - Boko Haram issues a warning to Christians in northern Nigeria to leave the region within three days.
- January 4 - Two bombs explode in Maiduguri with the Boko Haram movement believed to be responsible.
- January 5 - Islamist insurgency in Nigeria
  - Bombs explode in two northern Nigerian cities.
  - Gunmen attack a church in Gombe killing at least six people.
- January 6 - Eight people are killed and 10 wounded in Kano, in the latest in a series of attacks on church.
- January 7 - At least 37 people are killed in two days of attacks, after radical Islamic group Boko Haram issues an ultimatum for all Christians to leave the north.
- January 20 - Several people are killed in a series of bomb explosions in the city of Kano.
- January 21 - The death toll of a series of co-ordinated bombing attacks in Kano, Nigeria, rises to more than 140. The attacks, which targeted police stations across the city, are attributed to Islamist group Boko Haram.
- January 29 - Gunmen attack a police station in Kano, with Boko Haram believed responsible.

2012 Nigeria Floods The 2012 Nigeria floods began in early July 2012, killed 363 people and displaced over 2.1 million people as of 5 November 2012. According to the National Emergency Management Agency (NEMA), 30 of Nigeria's 36 states were affected by the floods. The floods were termed as the worst in 40 years, and affected an estimated total of seven million people. The estimated damages and losses caused by the floods were N2.6 trillion.

=== July ===
On 2 July 2012, many Nigerian coastal and inland cities experienced heavy rains, and residents of Lagos were "gasping for breath" due to the flooding. In addition, there was gridlock on major roads, causing people to cancel or postpone appointments they may have had. Thousands of stranded commuters had to pay increased fares for the few bus drivers who were willing to risk travelling on the roads, and construction of work by the Nigerian government on the inner Oke-Afa Road took a "heavy toll."

In mid-July 2012, flooding in the Ibadan metropolis caused some residents at Challenge, Oke-Ayo, and Eleyele to flee from their residences and save their lives. The flooding also prevented some Christians from attending churches in the morning, while a few bridges caved in. The Nigerian government said that certain structures on waterways had to be demolished as a result of the flooding, while Commissioner for Information and Orientation, Bosun Oladele, announced that there weren't any casualties from the flooding.

In late July 2012, at least 39 people were killed due to flooding in the central Nigerian Plateau State. Heavy rainfall caused the Lamingo dam to overflow near Jos, sweeping across a number of neighbourhoods in Jos, and approximately 200 homes were submerged or destroyed. In addition, at least 35 people were missing, while Manasie Phampe, the head of the Red Cross in the state, announced that relief efforts were ongoing. The floods left 3,000 people homeless, many of whom are taking refuge in government buildings in Jos.

=== August ===
In mid-August, flooding killed at least 33 people in Plateau State, and co-ordinator of the National Emergency Management Agency in central Nigeria Abdussalam Muhammad said that homes were destroyed while roads and bridges were washed away, obstructing relief efforts. Over 12,000 people were affected by the flooding in six districts of the state, while hundreds were rendered homeless.

=== September ===
Release of water from the Lagdo Reservoir in Cameroon caused the deaths of 30 people in Benue State.

=== October ===
In early-October, the floods spread to Delta State and Bayelsa State and rendered about 120,000 people homeless, according to state authorities and the Nigerian Red Cross.[3] Several temporary displacement sites set up were also flooded forcing people to flee. In Yenagoa, 3,000 people were sleeping at the Ovom State Sports Complex.[3] In Delta State, among the buildings destroyed by the floods were 20 health clinics, five hospitals, many schools, churches and government buildings. Schools were either closed or occupied by internally displaced persons. The floods also spread across Benue State where a local river overflowed causing the displacement of over 25,000 people.

On 9 October, Nigerian President Goodluck Jonathan released 17.6 billion naira (US$111 million) to various states and agencies for damage response, flood relief and rehabilitation.

Kogi State was the worst affected with 623,900 people being displaced and 152,575 hectares of farmland destroyed, according to a NEMA coordinator. Jonathan called the floods "a national disaster".
