= Olatunji Oyeyemi Moronfoye =

Nigerian politician

Prince Olatunji Oyeyemi Moronfoye

Commissioner for Information
- Governor: Abdulfatah Ahmed

Personal details
- Occupation: Politician

Olatunji Oyeyemi Moronfoye is a Nigerian politician who previously served as the Commissioner for Information in Kwara State during the tenure of former Governor Abdulfatah Ahmed.

== Controversies ==
Moronfoye was arraigned by the EFCC in 2015 on charges of abuse of office, contract inflation, diversion of public funds, and money laundering of about 15 million naira. He was accused of awarding over N200 million in contracts to a company he had an interest in. He was charged alongside Ope Saraki, a former Special Adviser to Governor Abdulfatah Ahmed, who also faced similar charges. Both were granted bail following their arraignment.
