= Share, Kwara State =

Town in Kwara state, Nigeria

Share (Saare) is an ancient Yoruba town in Ifelodun Local Government Area of Kwara State, Nigeria. Share is the headquarters of Ifelodun Local Government Area about 64 km (40 mi) from Ilorin the state capital of Kwara State. The people of Share belong to the Igbomina extract of Yoruba tribe.

== Notable people ==
- Abdulfatah Ahmed, former governor of Kwara State
