= 1905 in Nigeria =

- Decades: 1880s; 1890s; 1900s; 1910s; 1920s
- See also: Other events of 1905; Timeline of Nigerian history

Events from the year 1905 in Nigeria

== Births ==
- Alhaji Aliyu Makama in Bida
- Harcourt Whyte in Abonnema
- Agnes Okoh in Ogba–Egbema–Ndoni
- Fela Sowande in Abeokuta
