= Monguno ambush =

2013 battle between Nigerian militia and Boko Haram

- Part of Boko Haram insurgency
Date	31 August 2013
Location	Monguno, Borno State, Nigeria
Result	Boko Haram victory

Belligerents
Pro-government militiamen	Boko Haram

Strength
100	Unknown

Casualties and losses
24 killed 34 missing	Unknown

On 31 August 2013, jihadists from Boko Haram ambushed self-defense militiamen near Monguno, Borno State, Nigeria, killing at least 24 with 34 others missing.

== Background ==
Boko Haram emerged in 2009 as a jihadist social and political movement in a failed rebellion in northeast Nigeria. Throughout the following years, Abubakar Shekau unified militant Islamist groups in the region and continued to foment the rebellion against the Nigerian government, conducting terrorist attacks and bombings in cities and communities across the region. Just over a week before the ambush in Monguno, Boko Haram militants killed 35 civilians in Dumba.

== Ambush ==
On the night of 31 August, around a hundred militiamen from pro-government self-defense groups gathered in the forest near Monguno to support the Nigerian Army in an operation against Boko Haram. The vigilantes initially assumed that several trucks of men clothed in Nigerian Army uniforms were supporting soldiers, but they turned out to be disguised Boko Haram militants. The militiamen were caught off guard and many were shot at or run over by the jihadist-driven vehicles.

At least 24 militiamen were killed in the ambush, and 34 were missing.
