= Bayo Ohu =

Ogunbayo Ayanlola Ohu (June 18, 1964 – September 20, 2009), known as Bayo Ohu, was a Nigerian journalist. Ohu worked as the assistant news editor for The Guardian, an independent daily newspaper published in Nigeria.

== Early life and education ==
Ohu was born on June 18, 1964. He attended elementary school at the Local Authority Primary School in Iseyin, Oyo State. Ohu next enrolled at Progressive Grammar School in Ado-Awaye, which he completed in 1976. He finally completed his education at The Polytechnic, Ibadan between 1988 until 1990.

Ohu was hired as a reporter by The Guardian, a daily newspaper based in Lagos, in 1991. He worked for the newspaper as a state correspondent in Katsina State in northern Nigeria. Following his time in Katsina, Ohu was promoted to assistant news editor. He later returned to covering Nigerian politics for The Guardian.

== Death ==
Ohu was shot and killed at his home in Lagos, on the morning of Sunday, September 20, 2009. Five assailants were believed to have attacked Ohu, stealing his laptop and cell phone. Police initially believed that Ohu's murder was part of a robbery, though Ohu's work at The Guardian is now the suspected motive for his killing. The Nigeria Union of Journalists condemned Ohu's murder as a "targeted murder" and not a robbery.
