= Denis Edozie =

Nigerian judge

Dennis Edozie GCON

Justice Supreme Court of Nigeria
- In office 2003–2005

Judge High Court of Anambra State, Nigeria
- In office 1982–1990

Personal details
- Born: 10 November 1935 Enugu
- Died: 18 August 2018 (aged 82) Enugu
- Education: Holborn College, London; St. Thomas Schools, Ibusa, Delta State

Dennis Edozie GCON (10 November 1935 - 18 August 2018) was a Nigerian jurist who was Judge of the Supreme Court of Nigeria from 2003 until his retirement in 2005.

== Law career ==
Edozie was a teacher of Latin and mathematics from 1956 to 1958, before entering the government of Eastern Nigeria as an administrative officer from 1962 to 1965. He served as a judge of the High Court of Anambra State from 1982 to 1990, and then proceeded to the Court of Appeal, where he was a judge for twelve years from 1990 until his appointment to the Supreme Court in 2003.
