= 2014 Nigeria Immigration Service recruitment tragedy =

Stampede of job applicants resulting in 16 deaths

- Location: Nigeria
- Caused by: Overcrowding, impatience and stampede

Casualties
- Deaths: 16–24

The 2014 Nigeria Immigration Service recruitment tragedy occurred on Saturday March 15, 2014, when 6.5 million people in all 37 states of Nigeria (including the FCT) stormed various recruitment centres in the country for the 4000 vacant positions in the Nigeria Immigration Service. At least 16 job seekers were confirmed dead, and several scores of people were injured. The major causes of death was due to overcrowding, stampede, exhaustion, and impatience of the applicants.

== Background ==
According to the National Bureau of Statistics, at least 23.9% of Nigerians were unemployed (about 40 million) as of 2014. All applicants for the exercise paid 1000 Naira (about $6) before they could complete their registration for the test. They were also mandated to provide a medical report before being considered eligible for the exercise. Since the Nigeria Immigration Service (NIS) is a Paramilitary agency, they were instructed to put on white sporting attires for fitness training and easy identification. The Minister of the Interior, Abba Moro, and the NIS delegated the exercise to a consultancy firm citing transparency and accountability as reasons for this step.

== Locations with injuries or fatalities ==
The following does not include numerous episodes of fainting, most of which were heat-related, and all of which were treated successfully on the scene. At one location, Dan Anyiam Stadium in Owerri, ten people fainted while waiting to enter the venue, including three pregnant women.

=== Abuja National Stadium, Abuja (10 fatalities, 50 injured) ===
An estimated 100,000 job hopefuls arrived for testing in Abuja. 64,000 applicants had been invited to the 60,000 capacity Abuja National Stadium. When the gate opened, the crowd surged, killing seven people and injuring more than 50 others. Three of the injured died later at the National Hospital, which had become overwhelmed and sent several of its admitted patients to other hospitals. The event carried on.

=== Samuel Ogbemudia Stadium, Benin (4 fatalities, 50 injured) ===
At the Samuel Ogbemudia Stadium, applicants began gathering as early as 6:00 AM, and NIS officials lost control of the crowd of 28,000 by 10:00 AM. Soldiers began firing their rifles in the air, causing a panic in which four applicants were killed and 50 injured. Thirty of the injured received treatment at local hospitals and clinics. One witness described the four who died as three pregnant women and a nursing mother. Applicant screening began at 2:15 PM, but the event was soon called off.

=== Women Day Secondary School, Minna (3 fatalities, 4 critically injured) ===
Three applicants were killed and four were left in critical condition following the NIS recruitment event in Minna. The venue at the Women Day Secondary School had a capacity of 11,000. It was filled to capacity as early as 7:00 AM. A line formed outside the venue that was two kilometers long. When NIS officials sensed they were losing control over the crowd, they used tear gas, which caused a panic, leading to the trampling deaths of three applicants and critical injuries to four others.

=== Port Harcourt Stadium, Port Harcourt (5 fatalities, more than 8 injured) ===
The NIS invited 25,000 candidates to the 16,000 capacity Port Harcourt Stadium, though the NIS spokesman for the Port Harcourt Command, Bisong Abang, estimated the crowd to be 40,000. At 10:00 AM, NIS officials opened one of the two gates to begin screening applicants. The crowd surged forward, and many of those in front fell to the ground, with those behind them falling on top of them in a progressive crowd collapse. Soldiers fired their rifles into the air, as they did in Benin, though this caused further panic in the crowd. One unnamed witness said “far fewer people would have died today if the officers had not shot into the air." When it was over, two people were dead at the scene, and three died later in a local hospital. One physician, speaking anonymously, at Braithwaithe Memorial Specialist Hospital said 12 patients had been brought to that facility. Of those 12, four had died, four were in critical condition, and four had been treated and released. Other patients were treated in the nearby military hospital.

Although the shooting caused a panic, at least one witness credits the soldiers' actions with saving his life, as he and others at the front of the line were being crushed by those behind him, some losing consciousness, and the rifle shots dispersed the crowd.

=== Sani Abacha Stadium, Kano (0 fatalities, 7 injured) ===
Seven people were injured when a surge led to a crush at the only open entrance to the Sani Abacha stadium. No fatalities were reported in Kano.

=== Lagos (possibly one fatality or more, unknown injuries) ===
Moro told reporters that the deputy controller of immigration operation and passport told him that he had called off the recruitment event in Lagos because of "the unruly behaviour of the applicants". Moro also listed the Lagos venue among the locations where fatalities occurred, though he was not quoted as giving a number. An estimated 64,000 applicants had come to that recruiting site.

== Reactions ==
On March 16, 2014, the Minister for Interior Patrick Abba Moro explained in an interview that the applicant's impatience and failure to follow instructions were the cause of the tragedy. The Coalition Against Corrupt Leaders (CACOL) called for Moro's prosecution. Moro appeared before a Senate Committee on interior for two days of public hearings. On March 27, he accepted responsibility for the events and expressed his grief. He said he was saddened that his effort to put an end to nepotism and favoritism in the recruitment process had turned out like this. President Goodluck Jonathan ordered automatic employment for affected families. He also ordered immediate return of all the funds collected from the applicants. He went further to say that there would be a new recruitment exercise and the previous one would be cancelled.
