= Alabi Hassan Olajoku =

Nigerian businessman and politician

- Born: 9 February 1947; Mushin, Lagos State, Nigeria
- Died: 15 May 2005; Gbongan, Osun State, Nigeria
- Education: George Washington University
- Occupations: Businessman, politician
- Known for: Politics and business
- Title: Baba Adeeni of Ilobu

Alhaji Alabi Hassan Olajoku (1947–2005) was a Nigerian businessman and politician, who was murdered by unknown assailant on 15 May 2005.

== Early life ==
Alabi Hassan Olajoku was born on February 9, 1947, in Mushin, Lagos State, to the Aristocratic family of Alhaji Kehinde Asani Olajoku (Ile Oloosa Oko), of Isale Imole, llobu, Osun State. His father settled in Waigbo, a vibrant section of Mushin.

Asani Olajoku was a major player in the organized transport business in Lagos and he was one of the largest transporters between the early 1950s and the 1970s, owning one of the largest fleet of vehicles (BOLEKAJA). He was the Ekerin of Waigbo, Mushin, Lagos, Nigeria. Alabi Hassan Olajoku was the first son.

In 1959 Alhaji Hassan Olajoku was enrolled for his primary education at the Mrs. F. Kuti's Class, Owned by the educationist, Mrs. Olufunmilayo Ransome Kuti.

== Educational background ==
Alhaji Alabi Hassan Olajoku attended Ansaru-deen Grammar School, 63 Randle Avenue, Surulere, Lagos, where he started and completed his secondary education from 1964 to 1968. In 1972, Alhaji went to the US and then attended The North Virginia Community College, Alexandria, Virginia, where he obtained an associate degree in business, and later George Washington University, Washington D.C (Under the sponsorship of Lagos State Government), and obtained a B.B.A (Bachelor of Business Administration) in finance in 1976. He concluded his masters of Business Administration programme in the same university, coming out with an MBA (Finance and Investment) in 1978, before returning to Nigeria in 1979 for his National Youth Service Programme. Hassan remained on the dean's list throughout his stay at George Washington University.

== Professional background ==
In 1970 Alhaji Hassan was employed in the overseas department of National Bank of Nigeria Limited on Broad street (Banuso House), Lagos, Nigeria

In 1983, Alhaji Hassan floated his Management Consultancy Firm. One of his firms, Constructive Alternative Limited, was a notable tax consultants to Lagos, Rivers States and Federal Capital, Abuja.

Alhaji Alabi Hassan Olajoku was the chairman and Founder of the defunct Mushin Central Community Bank.

His network of companies also included Lone Star Consulting Limited, Hassan-Olajoku Construction Limited, Hassan-Ola Consultancy and Paramo Development Ventures.

== Political background ==
Alhaji Alabi Hassan Olajoku joined active politics in 1987 under the defunct zero party of the military regime of General lbrahim Babangida.

He was the Secretary of the defunct NRC for Lagos State, Nigeria and he helped in forming the then Alliance for Democracy (AD). The Alliance for Democracy later changed into the All Progressive Congress (APC), a party that has influenced the political and socio-economic environment in Nigeria.

== Personal life ==
Alhaji Hassan Olajoku was a pious Muslim and he held Islamic religious titles such as the Baba Adeeni of Ilobu Osun State as well as Oganla Adeeni of Alakuko, Lagos State.

Alhaji Alabi Hassan Olajoku was married to Hon. Fausat Hassan Olajoku. Together they had six children and they include Ajibade Olajoku, Babatunde Hassan Olajoku, Dr. Folawiyo Kareem Olajoku, Abisoye Mojeed Olajoku, Toyosi Olajoku and Omoboroji Fasilat Olajoku.

== Later life and murder ==
He was at the forefront of developing Osun State in all ramifications, including infrastructure, agriculture, rducation, industry and politics. It was in the course of pursuing this vision and championing the financing and strategy for Rauf Aregbesola's Election as Governor of the State of Osun, that he was brutally killed by unknown gunmen on May 15, 2005, at Gbongan Junction, Osun State, at the age of 58 years.

Rauf Aregbesola became the Governor of Osun on November 26, 2010, which is said to have giving the death of Alabi Hassan Olajoku life, that he did not die in vain. Rauf Aregbesola built an International world park at the very spot he was killed to honour his memory, named Hassan Olajoku Park Gbongan.
