= Hadiza Mailafia =

Nigerian politician

Nigerian Minister of Environment
- In office July 2011 – September 2013

Personal details
- Occupation: Politician

Hadiza Mailafia is a Nigerian politician. She served as the Minister of Environment from July 2011 to September 2013.
