= Benisheik massacre =

2013 killings in Nigeria

Coordinates: 11.8114°N 12.4908°E

- Part of the Boko Haram insurgency
- Location: Benisheik, Borno State, Nigeria
- Date: 18 September 2013
- Deaths: 159

The Benisheik massacre was a massacre that occurred on 18 September 2013 in Benisheik, Borno State, Nigeria. Some 161 people were killed. Boko Haram took responsibility for the attacks.

== Details ==
Benisheik, is located between the cities of Damaturu and Maiduguri in Borno State. The attack began on 18 September. The rebels arrived in the city through a convoy of over twenty trucks, dressed in stolen Nigerian Army uniforms and carrying anti-aircraft weapons. Allegedly, the attack was launched by Boko Haram in response to self-defense militas that were attempting to protect the city. The rebels entered the city and set fire to numerous buildings and set up roadside checkpoints on the road between Damaturu and Maiduguri. Drivers at these roadblocks were killed if they were from Borno State, while others were apparently free to go.

Two days later, Boko Haram claimed responsibility for the attack.

== Casualties ==
The day after the attack, Borno State officials put the death toll at 87, though they were still looking for new bodies.

On 22 September Abdulaziz Kolomi, of the state's environmental protection agency, said that an additional 55 bodies had been found, raising the death toll to 142. According to police sources, another 16 bodies were found in Benisheik and another 19 between Maiduguri and Bamboa. The Daily Trust reported that in total 161 people had been killed; 142 travelers, 2 soldiers, 3 police officers and 14 citizens.
