= 2013 Dumba massacre =

Boko Haram attack in Nigeria

- Location: Dumba, Borno State, Nigeria
- Date: August 19, 2013
- Target: Mosque-goers
- Deaths: 35
- Injuries: 15
- Perpetrator: Boko Haram
- Motive: Revenge for Dumba villagers joining self-defense militias

On August 19, 2013, jihadists from Boko Haram attacked the village of Dumba, Borno State, Nigeria, killing 35 people and injuring 14 more.

== Background ==
Boko Haram emerged in 2009 as a jihadist social and political movement in a failed rebellion in northeast Nigeria. Throughout the following years, Abubakar Shekau unified militant Islamist groups in the region and continued to foment the rebellion against the Nigerian government, conducting terrorist attacks and bombings in cities and communities across the region. Six days before the Dumba massacre, Boko Haram militants killed 44 people at a mosque in Konduga.

== Massacre ==
Dumba is a remote village in Borno State, several of whose villagers organized a self-defense group against Boko Haram attacks in the early days of the insurgency. The militants dressed in Nigerian army uniforms during the attack and situated themselves at a crossroads outside the town's mosque. As the mosque-goers were leaving morning prayer, they were shot at by the jihadists. Due to the village's remoteness, public information about the massacre was reported for the first time on April 23, four days later.

35 people were killed in the massacre, and 14 more were injured.
