= 2008 in Nigeria =

This article is about the particular significance of the year 2008 to Nigeria and its people.

== Incumbents ==
=== Federal government ===
- President: Umaru Musa Yar'Adua (PDP)
- Vice President: Goodluck Jonathan (PDP)
- Senate President: David Mark (PDP)
- House Speaker: Dimeji Bankole (PDP)
- Chief Justice: Idris Legbo Kutigi

=== Governors ===
- Abia State: Theodore Orji (PDP)
- Adamawa State: Murtala Nyako (PDP)
- Akwa Ibom State: Godswill Akpabio (PDP)
- Anambra State: Peter Obi (APGA)
- Bauchi State: Isa Yuguda (ANPP)
- Bayelsa State:
  - until 16 April: Timipre Sylva (PDP)
  - 16 April-27 May: Werinipre Seibarugo (N/A)
  - starting 27 May: Timipre Sylva (PDP)
- Benue State: Gabriel Suswam (PDP)
- Borno State: Ali Modu Sheriff (ANPP)
- Cross River State: Liyel Imoke (PDP)
- Delta State: Emmanuel Uduaghan (PDP)
- Ebonyi State: Martin Elechi (PDP)
- Edo State: Oserheimen Osunbor (PDP) (until 11 November), Adams Aliyu Oshiomle (AC) (starting 11 November)
- Ekiti State: Olusegun Oni (PDP)
- Enugu State: Sullivan Chime (PDP)
- Gombe State: Mohammed Danjuma Goje (PDP)
- Imo State: Ikedi Ohakim (PDP)
- Jigawa State: Sule Lamido (PDP)
- Kaduna State: Namadi Sambo (PDP)
- Kano State: Ibrahim Shekarau (ANPP)
- Katsina State: Ibrahim Shema (PDP)
- Kebbi State: Usman Saidu Nasamu Dakingari (PDP)
- Kogi State:
  - until 6 February: Ibrahim Idris (PDP)
  - 6 February-5 April: Clarence Olafemi (PDP)
  - starting 5 April: Ibrahim Idris (PDP)
- Kwara State: Bukola Saraki (AC)
- Lagos State: Babatunde Fashola (AC)
- Nasarawa State: Aliyu Doma (PDP)
- Niger State: Mu'azu Babangida Aliyu (PDP)
- Ogun State: Gbenga Daniel (PDP)
- Ondo State: Olusegun Agagu (PDP)
- Osun State: Olagunsoye Oyinlola (PDP)
- Oyo State: Christopher Alao-Akala (PDP)
- Plateau State: Jonah David Jang (PDP)
- Rivers State: Chibuike Amaechi (PDP)
- Sokoto State:
  - until 11 April: Aliyu Magatakarda Wamakko (PDP)
  - 11 April-28 May: Abdullahi Balarabe Salame (N/A)
  - starting 28 May: Aliyu Magatakarda Wamakko (PDP)
- Taraba State: Danbaba Suntai (PDP)
- Yobe State: Mamman Bello Ali (ANPP)
- Zamfara State: Mahmud Shinkafi (PDP)

== Events ==
- 26 April - 4th Africa Movie Academy Awards take place in Abuja.
- 16 May - 2008 Ijegun pipeline explosion occurs killing between 10 and 100 people.
- August - Nigeria competes at the 2008 Summer Olympics winning 6 medals.
- September - Nigeria competes at the 2008 Summer Paralympics winning 9 medals.

== Deaths ==
- 27 April - Abraham Adesanya, politician, lawyer and activist (born 1922).
- 24 May - Sonny Okosun, musician (born 1947).
