= Timeline of Nigerian history =

This is a timeline of Nigerian history, comprising important legal and territorial changes and political events in Nigeria and its predecessor states. To read about the background to these events, see History of Nigeria. See also the list of heads of state of Nigeria.

== Early history ==
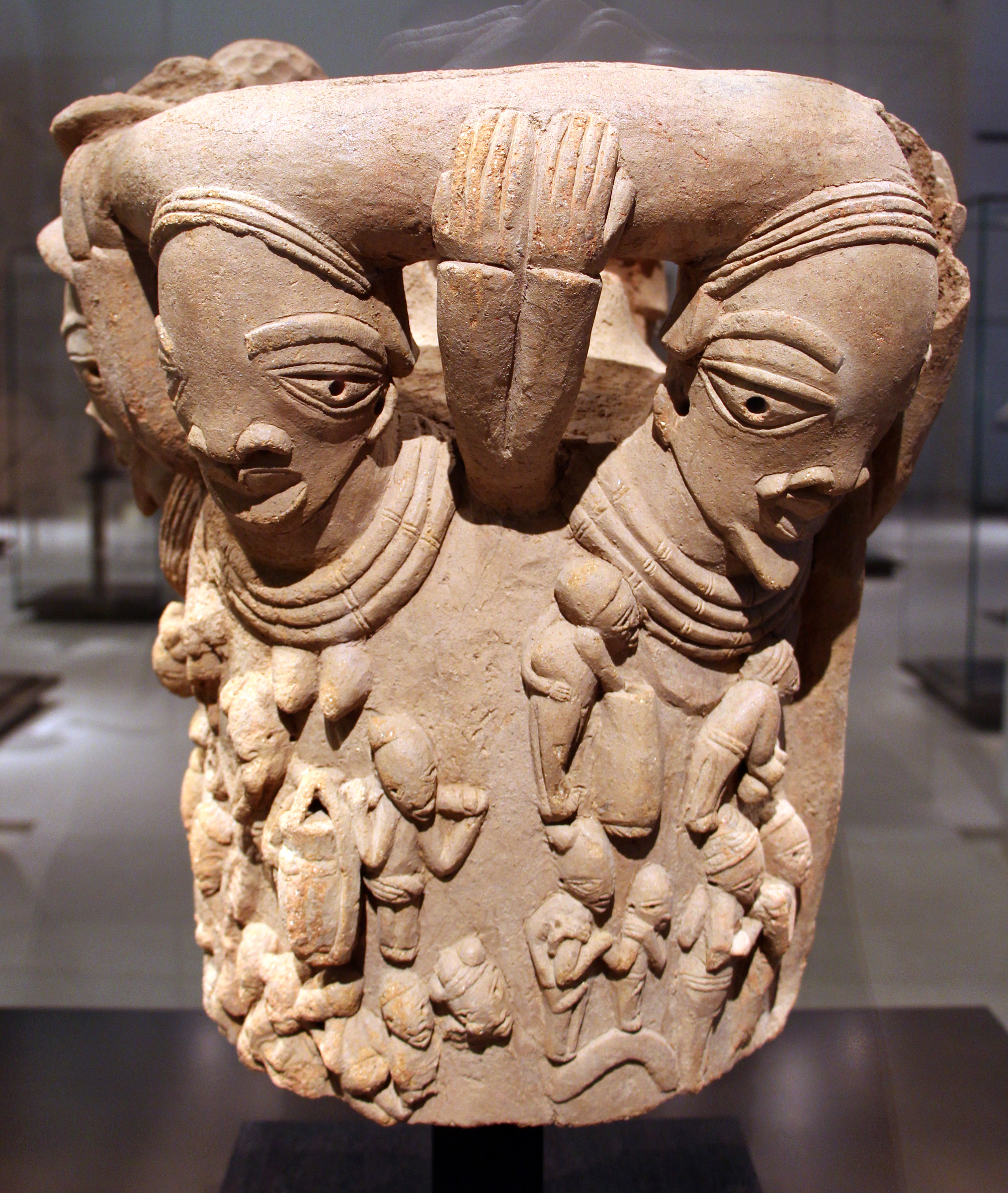
Nok sculpture on display in Paris.

- 250,000 B.C. - ugwuele and Ngodo Acheulean men crafted deoterite stone tools in Isiume cave, Igboland
- 12,000 B.C. - The time of the iho Eleru men
- 8000 B.C. – Creation of currently known stone shelters were inhabited by early men
- 5000 – 3000 B.C. – Development of agriculture (probably including yam cultivation) and animal husbandry.
- 3000 - 500 B.C.- Iron smelting hamlet polities began in Lejja ,Nsude , Umundu . Pottery were made in Ugwuegu valley Ehugbo , Awgu Northern Igboland
- 500 B.C. – A.D. 200 – Nok culture flourishes in Northern Nigeria.
- 400–100 B.C. – Ironworking polity around Opi, Nsukka flourished .
- 500 A.D. - End of the Nok culture

== Rise of Igbo, Yoruba, Edo, and Muslim civilizations ==
- 700 A.D – Early Ijaw settlement.
- 800 A.D –
  - Mega-state at Igbo-Ukwu has complex social structure, produces copious artifacts including bronzes.
  - Yoruba civilization already well established, based on thirteen farming villages centered at Ilé-Ifẹ̀.
  - Kingdom of Kanem (later Kanem-Bornu) founded by Saif.
- 900 – The reign of the Kingdom of Nri began.
- 1100 – Rulers of the Kanem empire embrace Islam. Mai Dunama I (r. 1097–1150) drowns at Suez in 1150. Kanem establish diplomatic ties with Tunisia.
- 1200 –
  - Ilé-Ifẹ̀ becomes Yoruba metropolis.
  - Kanem increase influence in the Islamic world throughout the century. It establishes a hostel in Cairo for students and pilgrims from its domain. The empire conquers Fezzan during the reign of Dunama II (r. 1221–1259).
  - Oba Ewedo comes to power in Benin Empire in 1255.
- 1300 – Fulani Muslim scholars settle in Kanem from the Mali empire. Beginning of war between the Kanem Empire and the Bilala; mai Dawud expelled from his capital of Njimi and subsequently killed in 1376.
- 1400 –
  - Beginning of European contact on the Atlantic coast in 1450.
  - Mai Ali Ghaji (r. 1472–1504) establishes Birnin N'gazargamu and founds the Bornu empire. He conquers Borku and Tibesti, and further exacts tribute from some Hausa states, including Kano.
- 1500 –
  - The nominally Muslim Hausa Kingdoms were established in Northern Nigeria.
  - The ascension of Idris Alauma (r. 1571–1602/03) to the Bornu throne towards the end of this century. The empire reaches its zenith. The Kanem civil war ends resulting in Kanem being incorporated as a province within the Bornu Empire. Idris sends a diplomatic envoy to Istanbul requesting the return of the Fezzan region. However, the request was ultimately declined by the Ottoman authorities. Fezzan recaptured by Bornu in 1585.

== 17th century ==
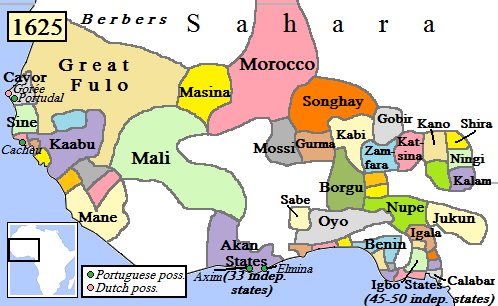
Political map of West Africa in 1625. Modern Nigeria includes parts of Oyo, Borgu, Nupe, and Benin areas, as well as Igbo states.

== 18th century ==
Year	Date	
1728		Oyo Empire invades Kingdom of Dahomey.
1767	June	British slave traders facilitate massacre on the Calabar River.

== 19th century ==
Year	Date	Event
1803		Escape to Igbo Landing in Georgia, USA.
1804	21 February	Usman dan Fodio's hijra out of Gobir begins marking the start of his jihad and the founding of the Sokoto Caliphate.
1807	25 March	Slave Trade Act 1807: Britain prohibits subjects from trafficking in slaves.
1808	May	Gwoni Mukhtar drives Mai Ahmad out of Birnin N'gazargamu and occupies the city.
1809		Birnin N'gazargamu recaptured by Mai Dunama IX with the assistance of Muhammad al-Kanemi and his followers.
1823	17 February	Hugh Clapperton reaches Kukawa and is received by Shehu al-Kanemi.
1823		Hugh Clapperton visits Sokoto where he meets with Sultan Muhammad Bello.
1833		End of Oyo empire.
1841		Niger Expedition of Christian missionaries.
1846		Church Missionary Society sets up mission at Abeokuta.
1846		Kukawa becomes the capital of the Bornu empire. The Sayfawa dynasty reaches its end and the al-Kanemi dynasty begins its rule over Bornu.
1851	1 January	Treaty Between Great Britain and Lagos, 1 January 1852
1851		Heinrich Barth reaches the Sokoto Caliphate and the Bornu empire
1861	6 August	Lagos Treaty of Cession: British annexes Lagos, with status of Crown Colony.
1864		Samuel Ajayi Crowther becomes first African Anglican Bishop.
1879		George Taubman Goldie amalgamated various British ventures to form the United African Company (later known as the Royal Niger Company).
1880		The conquest of Southern Nigeria by the British began.
1885		Other European powers acknowledged British sovereignty over Nigeria at the Berlin Conference.
1887		King Ja Ja of Opobo exiled to West Indies by British.
1891		John Payne Jackson becomes publisher of Lagos Weekly Record.
1891		Parfait-Louis Monteil visits Sultan Abd ar-Rahman in Sokoto.
1892		British raid uses maxim guns to defeat Ijebu Kingdom, thereby moving towards complete dominance in the southwest area surrounding Lagos.
1893		British incorporate Yoruba lands in southwest into new protectorate.
1894		Brassmen revolt against Royal Niger Company.
1894		Rabih az-Zubayr conquers Bornu empire and establishes his capital in Dikwa.
1895	29 January	King Koko leads successful attack on Royal Niger Company headquarters in Akassa.
1895	2 February	Consul-general Claude Maxwell MacDonald receives a letter from King Koko offering to release hostages in exchange for a redress of grievances against the Company. This request is declined.
1895	20 February	Royal Navy counter-attacks against King Koko, razes Nembe.
1897	4 January	Covert foray of the Niger Coast Protectorate Force against Benin City is discovered and destroyed by the Kingdom of Benin.
1897	9–18 February	Retaliatory Benin Expedition of 1897 leads to capture of Benin City.
1898		Beginning of Ekumeku Movement against British rule.
1900	1 January	All Nigeria now under Crown rule. Protectorate of Northern Nigeria created from Company holdings.

== 20th century ==
Year	Date	Event
1901		Anglo-Aro war: The war began. The Aro Confederacy began to decline. (to 1902)
1902		Anglo-Aro war: The war ended.
1903	January	Capture of Kano
1903		The British conquered most of Northern Nigeria, including the Sokoto Caliphate.
1905		The British conquest of Southern Nigeria ended.
1906	1 May	Colonial Office amalgamates Lagos Colony with Southern Nigeria Protectorate.
1908		German-owned Nigerian Bitumen Company began searching for petroleum off coast.
1908		Protests against water fees in Lagos, encouraged by nationalistic journalism of Herbert Macaulay.
1912		Lord Frederick Lugard, Governor of Northern Nigeria, established a system of indirect rule. Creation of Southern Nigeria Civil Service Union; later, Nigerian Civil Servants' Union.
1914	January	Northern Nigeria and Southern Nigeria were amalgamated into Nigeria. British Crown gained monopoly rights over mineral extraction.
1914		Nigerian soldiers fight under British command in World War I.
1918		The Adubi War is fought in Egba Land.
1920		National Congress of British West Africa founded in Accra.
1922		Clifford Constitution.
1925		West African Students' Union.
1928	April	British begin direct taxation.
1929	14 October	New governor implements plans to expand taxation.
1929	November	"Women's War": Widespread revolt against taxation.
1931		Founding of Nigeria Union of Teachers.
1936		Founding of Nigeria Youth Movement.
1937		Shell D'Arcy Petroleum Development Company of Nigeria (later Shell-BP) granted petroleum exploration rights.
1944		National Council of Nigeria and the Cameroons founded by Nnamdi "Zik" Azikiwe.
1945		Countrywide general strike.
1945		Adoption of first Ten Year Plan for economic development.
1946		Nigeria entered a period of decolonization and growing Nigerian nationalism.
1946		Introduction of the Sir Arthur Richards constitution
1950		A conference of northern and southern delegates was held in Ibadan.
1951		MacPherson Constitution.
1951		Yoruba-aligned Action Group founded; headed by Obafemi Awolowo.
1953	1 May	Northern vs. Southern violence breaks out in the Northern city of Kano.
1956		Shell-BP expedition makes first discoveries of major petroleum deposits, at Olobiri and Afam.
1957		Nigeria held a Constitutional conference.
1959		Nigeria holds its first national election to set up an independent government. Northern politicians won a majority of seats in the Parliament.
1959		1959 Petroleum Profits Tax Ordinance establishes 50–50 split of oil revenues between corporation and government. Socony Mobil receives offshore oil license.
1960		The period of nationalism and decolonization ended.
1960		Tiv uprising.
1960	1 October	Nigeria gained independence from Britain under Prime Minister Tafawa Balewa and President Nnamdi Azikiwe.
1961	11 February	A referendum is held in the British Cameroons, resulting in the Northern Cameroons joining Nigeria and the Southern Cameroons joining Cameroon.
1962		Tennessee Nigeria receives offshore oil license.
1963	1 October	Nigeria severed its remaining ties to Britain, marking the birth of the Nigerian First Republic.
1963		Amoseas and Gulf receive offshore oil licenses.
1964	1 December	National parliamentary election.
1964		SAFRAP and AGIP receive offshore oil licenses.
1964		Another Tiv uprising heavily suppressed by police.
1965		Elections held in Western Region.
1965	Autumn	Refinery completed at Port Harcourt; owned 60% by Federal Government, 40% by Shell-BP.
1966	15 January	A military coup deposed the government of the First Republic. Balewa, Premier of Northern Nigeria Ahmadu Bello, and Finance Minister Festus Okotie-Eboh, were assassinated.
1966	16 January	The Federal Military Government was formed, with General Johnson Aguiyi-Ironsi acting as head of state and Supreme Commander of the Federal Republic.
1966	23 February	Isaac Adaka Boro declared the secession of the "Niger Delta Republic". The secession was crushed by Ojukwu and 159 men were killed.
1966	29 July	A counter-coup by military officers of northern extraction deposed the Federal Military Government. Aguiyi-Ironsi and Adekunle Fajuyi, Military Governor of the Western Region, were assassinated. General Yakubu Gowon became President.
1967		Killings of people of Eastern Nigerian origin claimed the lives of many thousands mostly Christian Igbo people. This was carried out by the Muslim Hausa and Fula people. This triggered a migration of the Igbo back to the East.
1967	27 May	Gowon announces further subdivision of Nigeria, into twelve states. These include subdivision of the Eastern Region which will undermine its political power.
1967	30 May	Nigerian-Biafran War: General Chukwuemeka Odumegwu Ojukwu, Military Governor of Eastern Nigeria, declared his province an independent republic called Biafra.
1970	8 January	Ojukwu fled into exile. His deputy Philip Effiong became acting President of Biafra
1970	15 January	Effiong surrendered to Nigerian forces. Biafra was reintegrated into Nigeria.
1971		Nigeria joins Organization of Petroleum Exporting Countries.
1973	22 January	A plane crashed in Kano, Nigeria, killing 176 people.
1975	29 January	General Yakubu Gowon was overthrown in a bloodless coup. General Murtala Mohammed became Head of State.
1976	13 February	Mohammed was assassinated on his way to work. His deputy, Lieutenant-General Olusegun Obasanjo, became Head of State and set a date to end military rule.
1979		Shehu Shagari won election to the Executive Presidency of the American-style Second Republic.
1979	1 October	Shagari was sworn in as President.
1983		Shagari won reelection.
1983	31 December	Shagari's government was ejected from power in a palace coup, marking the end of the Second Republic. General Muhammadu Buhari became Head of State and Chairman of the Supreme Military Council of Nigeria.
1984	17 April	The Buhari regime promulgated Decree No. 4, the "Public Officer's Protection Against False Accusation" Decree, which made it an offence to ridicule the government by publication of false information.
1985	August	Buhari was overthrown in a palace coup. General Ibrahim Babangida became Head of State and President of the Armed Forces Ruling Council of Nigeria.
1990	April	Middle Belt Christian officers, led by Major Gideon Orkar, attempt to overthrow Babangida in an unsuccessful coup.
1992		Two political parties, the Social Democratic Party (SDP) and the National Republican Convention (NRC) were established by Babangida in an attempt to return to civilian rule.
1993	12 June	Moshood Kashimawo Olawale Abiola won a presidential election. Babangida annulled the results.
1993	26 August	Babangida stepped down due to pressure from the Armed Forces Ruling Council. Ernest Adegunle Oladeinde Shonekan assumed power as Interim Head of State.
1993	17 November	Shonekan was forced to resign from office. Defence Minister Sani Abacha became Head of State and established the Provisional Ruling Council of Nigeria.
1995	13 March	The Abacha administration arrested Obasanjo for allegedly supporting a secret coup plot.
1995	10 November	Human and environmental rights activist Ken Saro-Wiwa was hanged with eight others.
1998	8 June	Abacha died from a heart attack. Abdusalami Abubakar became Head of State and Chairman of the Provisional Ruling Council of Nigeria and lifted the ban on political activity.
1998	15 June	Obasanjo was released from prison.
1999	10 February	Obasanjo was elected President.
1999	29 May	Obasanjo was sworn in, ushering in the Fourth Republic.
1999	19 December	Obasanjo ordered the Nigerian Armed Forces to raid the town of Odi in the Niger Delta, in response to the murder of twelve policemen by local militia.
2000	27 January	Sharia was established in the predominantly Muslim state of Zamfara.
2000	May	Religious riots erupted in Kaduna over the implementation of sharia.
2000	5 June	The Obasanjo administration established the Niger Delta Development Commission (NDDC) to tackle human and ecological issues in the Niger Delta region of Southern Nigeria.

== 21st century ==
Year	Date	Event
2002		Religious riots erupt over the Miss World pageant due to be hosted in Abuja.
2002	10 October	The International Court of Justice (ICJ) ruled against Nigeria in favor of Cameroon over the disputed oil-rich Bakassi peninsula territory.
2003	April	Obasanjo won reelection as President.
2003	29 May	Obasanjo was sworn in for a second term as President.
2004		Obasanjo declared a state of emergency in response to the eruption of ethnoreligious violence in Plateau State.
2006	16 May	The National Assembly of Nigeria voted against a Constitutional amendment to remove term limits.
2006	13 June	Obasanjo met with Cameroonian President Paul Biya and Secretary General of the United Nations Kofi Annan in New York City to resolve a dispute over Bakassi.
2006	1 August	Nigerian troops began to pull out of Bakassi.
2006	March through August	Several buildings collapse in Lagos killing 27 people.
2007	15 March	The Independent National Electoral Commission (INEC) released the names of twenty-four approved candidates for the presidential elections.
2007	21 April	Umaru Yar'Adua, Governor of Katsina State, was elected President of Nigeria.
2009	23 November	President Umaru Yar'Adua travels to Saudi Arabia to receive treatment for a heart condition. This inspires a constitutional crises and calls for him to step down as he was deemed unfit to continue in power.
2010	5 May	Umaru Yar'Adua, President of Nigeria pronounced dead after a long illness. Goodluck Ebele Jonathan who was already the Acting President at that time succeeds him. The Government of Nigeria declares seven days of mourning.
2010	1 October	Nigeria celebrates the Golden Jubilee of her independence (50 years). However, the celebrations are hindered by two car bombings close to the Eagles' Square in Abuja, where the elite had gathered to celebrate the golden jubilee.

== 2011 upward ==
2011 in Nigeria
2012 in Nigeria
2013 in Nigeria
2014 in Nigeria
2015 in Nigeria
2016 in Nigeria
2017 in Nigeria
2018 in Nigeria
2019 in Nigeria
2020 in Nigeria
2021 in Nigeria
2022 in Nigeria

== See also ==
- List of years in Nigeria
- Timelines of cities in Nigeria: Ibadan, Kano, Lagos, Port Harcourt
