= List of governors of Western State =

This is a list of premiers, administrators and governors of Western State, Nigeria, including the former Western Region. In 1976-02-03, Western State was divided into Ogun, Ondo, and Oyo states.

Western Region Premier	Title	Took office	Left office	Party	Notes
Obafemi Awolowo	Premier	1954	1959		
Samuel Ladoke Akintola	Premier	1960	May 1962		
Senator (Doctor) Moses Majekodunmi	Administrator	29 June 1962	December 1962		Appointed during political emergency
Samuel Ladoke Akintola	Premier	1 January 1963	15 January 1966		
Western Region Governor					
Sir John Dalzell Rankine	Governor	1 October 1954	July 1960		
Sir Adesoji Aderemi	Governor	July 1960	December 1962		
Chief Joseph Odeleye Fadahunsi	Governor	December 1962	15 January 1966		
Lt. Colonel Adekunle Fajuyi	Governor	15 January 1966	29 July 1966	(Military)	
Robert Adeyinka Adebayo	Governor	4 August 1966	27 May 1967	(Military)	Continued as governor of Western State
Western State Governor					Excludes Lagos, split off as a separate state
Robert Adeyinka Adebayo	Governor	28 May 1967	1 April 1971	(Military)	
Brig. Gen. Christopher Oluwole Rotimi	Governor	1 April 1971	July 1975	(Military)	
Akintunde Aduwo	Governor	30 July 1975	30 August 1975	(Military)	
David Jemibewon	Governor	30 August 1975	March 1976	(Military)	

== See also ==
- Nigeria
- States of Nigeria
- List of state governors of Nigeria
