= Ibrahim Hassan Dankwambo =

Nigerian politician (born 1962)

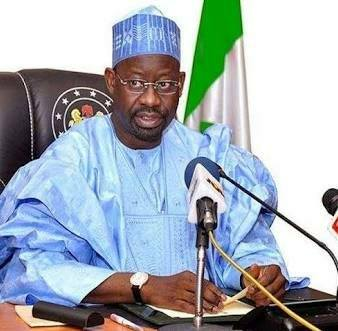

Senator for Gombe North
- Incumbent
- Assumed office 13 June 2023
- Preceded by: Sa'idu Ahmed Alkali

Governor of Gombe State
- In office 29 May 2011 – 29 May 2019
- Deputy: David Miyims Albashi; Tha'anda Rubainu; Charles Yau Illiya
- Preceded by: Mohammed Danjuma Goje
- Succeeded by: Muhammad Inuwa Yahaya

Personal details
- Born: 4 April 1962 (age 64) Gombe, Nigeria
- Party: Peoples Democratic Party
- Occupation: Politician; accountant

Ibrahim Hassan Dankwambo (born 4 April 1962) is a Nigerian politician who has served as senator for Gombe North since 2023. He previously served as governor of Gombe State from 2011 to 2019. He is a former Accountant-General of the Federation.

== Early life and education ==
Dankwambo was born on 4 April 1962 at Herwagana Gombe State. He graduated from Ahmadu Bello University (ABU) Zaria in 1985, with a degree in Accounting. He obtained a Master of Science degree in Economics from the University of Lagos in 1992 and a PhD in Accounting from Igbinedion University. He began his career with Coopers & Lybrand in 1985, and worked at the Central Bank of Nigeria from year of 1988 to 1999. He was then appointed Accountant General of Gombe State, holding this position until 2005. He was appointed Accountant-General of the Federation on 20 April 2005. He also served on the Board of the Central Bank of Nigeria. He held this office until he resigned to start his campaign for election as Governor of Gombe State in January 2011.

== Political career ==
Dankwambo was elected governor of Gombe state in the 26 April 2011 election. He won the election with a total vote of 596,481 ahead of Alhaji Abubakar Aliyu of the Congress for Progressive Change (CPC) with 91,781 votes and Senator Sa'idu Umar Kumo of the All Nigeria People's Party (ANPP) political party with 84,959 votes.

As governor, Dankwambo lost his deputy, David Miyims Albashi, who died on 4 November 2011 in a German hospital due to injuries sustained in a car crash on 28 August 2011. On 17 December 2011, Dankwambo appointed Tha'anda Rubainu as Deputy Governor. After his re-election in 2015, Charles Yau Iliya was his deputy governor till the end of his second term in 2019.

Dankwambo was elected into the Senate of the Federal Republic of Nigeria during the 2023 general elections under the People Democratic Party (PDP). He polled 143,155 votes defeating his closest opponent, Senator Saidu Alkali with 77,948 votes.

== Fellowship ==
He is a fellow of Institute of Chartered Accountant of Nigeria, Chartered Institute of Taxation of Nigeria, Chartered Institute of Bankers and Nigeria Institute of Marketers.

== Traditional titles ==
- Tolban Gombe
- Durbin Tangale

== See also ==
- List of governors of Gombe State
