= Abdulfatah Ahmed =

Nigerian banker and politician (born 1963)

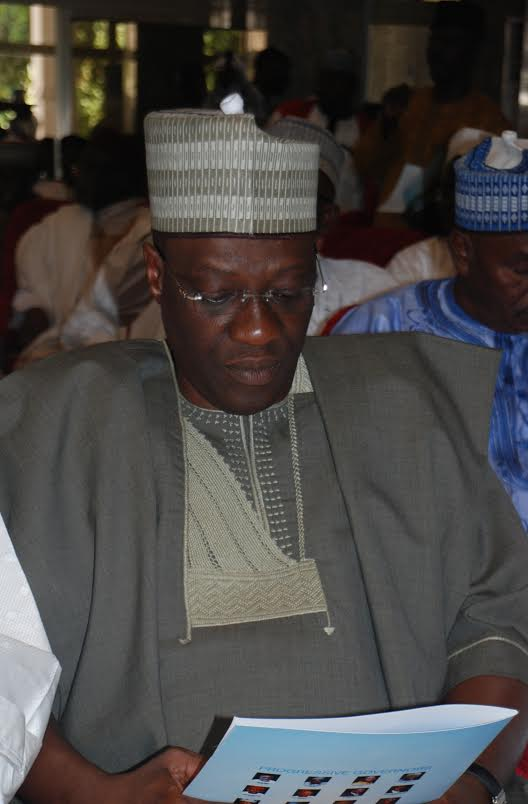
- Abdulfatah Ahmed at PGLS

Governor of Kwara State
- In office 29 May 2011 – 29 May 2019
- Preceded by: Abubakar Bukola Saraki
- Succeeded by: AbdulRahman AbdulRazaq

Personal details
- Born: 29 December 1963 (age 62) Share, Kwara State, Nigeria
- Party: People's Democratic Party (PDP)
- Website: drabdulfatahahmed.com

Abdulfatah Ahmed (born 29 December 1963) is a Nigerian banker and politician. He is the former Governor of Kwara State.

== Background ==
Ahmed was born on 29 December 1963 in Share, Ifelodun Local Government Area of Kwara State. He attended Government College Funtua, Katsina State (1973–1978) and the school of Basic Studies of Kwara State College of Technology (now Kwara State Polytechnic), Ilorin (1978–1980). He went on to the University of Ilorin where he earned a BSc in Chemistry (1986) and a Master of Business Administration (MBA, 1992).

Ahmed was a lecturer in Organic Chemistry and later Acting Head of Department at Federal College of Arts and Science, Sokoto, in Sokoto State (1986–1990). He became an Assistant Manager at District Savings and Loans, Lagos (1991–1993). In 1993, he started work with Guaranty Trust Bank in the Credit and Marketing Unit. In 1998, he moved to Societe Generale Bank Nigeria as a Senior Manager/Group Head, Consumer Banking. Later, he became Public Sector Group for the North West region.

== Political career ==
Ahmed was appointed Commissioner for Finance and Economic Development at the start of Abubakar Bukola Saraki's Kwara State Administration (2003–2009). He then became Commissioner of the newly created Ministry of Planning and Economic Development. During this period, Ahmed was also Treasurer of the forum of Commissioners of Finance in Nigeria for six years, and chairman, Budget Formulation Committee and Economic Team of Kwara State. He was appointed a member of board of directors of the International Aviation College, Ilorin, Chairman of the Millennium Development Goals implementation committee and Chairman of Shonga Farms Holdings Ltd.

In the PDP primaries, Ahmed won 695 votes, defeating Chief Bashir Omoloja Bolarinwa (39 votes) and Alhaji Yekinni Alabi (9 votes). In the 26 April 2011 elections, Ahmed won 254,969 votes. The runner-up, Dele Belgore of the Action Congress of Nigeria (ACN) scored 152,580 votes.

Ahmed announced his defection from the All Progressives Congress shortly after his predecessor and Senate President Bukola Saraki announced his resignation from the (APC) on 31 July 2018.

== EFCC investigations and arrests ==
=== Fraud ===
In December 2020, Ahmed was arrested by Nigerian authorities in connection with his alleged involvement in a long-running financial fraud. The Economic and Financial Crimes Commission had been probing his wife's involvement as well. The fraud may have reached two billion naira.

=== Diversion of Kwara public funds ===
On 17 May 2021, the Economic and Financial Crimes Commission detained Ahmed for a second time after seven hours of interrogation over around ₦9 billion that were allegedly diverted from the Kwara State government. The money was alleged to have been diverted over the course of Ahmed’s time as Governor and his time as Finance Commissioner in the Governor Bukola Saraki administration.

== Governor of Kwara State ==
During his tenure as Governor, Gov. Ahmed implemented a number of programs and projects; The Shared Prosperity agenda, which aimed to improve the lives of all Kwara residents through job creation, infrastructural development, and social welfare programs. The Kwara State Bridge Empowerment Scheme (KWABES), which provided unemployed graduates with the opportunity to gain work experience and skills. The Kwara Infrastructure Development Fund (IF-K). IF-K is a contributory scheme designed to pool funds for high value infrastructure projects, which was used to finance the construction of new roads, schools, and hospitals, the social welfare program, which provided financial assistance to the elderly, widows, and orphans. Ahmed's administration was also credited with improving the state's education system, As part of contributions to the development of the education sector, Governor Abdulfatah Ahmed constructed and rehabilitated 400 block of classrooms at primary and secondary school levels. His administration introduced free tuition and notebooks at senior secondary school level. To expand access to tertiary education in the state, Dr. Ahmed also approved the reduction in the tuition fees for Kwara State University (KWASU) students by 30 per cent and also commenced the construction of an N800m Engineering complex for the Kwara State University, which is now near completion. healthcare system, and security.

== Post-governorship ==
After leaving office in 2019, Gov. Ahmed returned to the banking sector. He is currently the Managing Director of First City Monument Bank.

=== Illegal sale and mismanagement of Kwara public assets ===
In May 2021, the Judicial Commission of Inquiry on the sales of Kwara State Government Assets between May 1999 and May 2019, a commission set up by Kwara State Governor AbdulRahman AbdulRazaq, accused Ahmed of selling state assets at suspiciously low prices to cronies and recommended Ahmed along with his predecessor as Governor Bukola Saraki for prosecution. Saraki, along with Ahmed and others, were said to have illegally sold government properties outside the state and grossly mismanaged state assets.

== See also ==
- List of Yoruba people
- List of governors of Kwara
