= Ibrahim Shema =

Former Governor of Katsina State (born 1957)

Ibrahim Shehu Shema

Governor of Katsina State
- In office 29 May 2007 – 29 May 2015

Personal details
- Born: 22 September 1957 (age 69) Dutsin-Ma, Katsina State, Federation of Nigeria
- Party: All Progressives Congress (APC)
- Education: LLB (1983), MBA (1998)
- Alma mater: Ahmadu Bello University, Zaria
- Profession: Law

Ibrahim Shehu Shema; born 22 September 1957) is a Nigerian lawyer and politician who was elected as a Governor of the north western State of Katsina during the 2007 general elections.

He was re-elected for another four-year term on 28 April 2011, running on the People's Democratic Party (PDP) political party. His second four-year term ended on 29 May 2015 after which he handed over to Aminu Bello Masari, elected governor on the political party of All Progressives Congress (APC).

== Background ==
Ibrahim Shema was born on 22 September 1957 at Dutsin-Ma town in Katsina State. He attended Nasarawa Primary School, Katsina (1964–1971) and Government Secondary School, Kafanchan (1972–1976). He studied at the College of Arts, Science & Technology, Zaria from 1977 to 1980, when he gained admission into Ahmadu Bello University, Zaria, graduating with an LLB in 1983. A year later, he obtained his B.L at the Nigeria Law School, Victoria Island, Lagos. While practicing law, he studied for a Master of Business Administration from Ahmadu Bello University, which he obtained in 1998.

== Political career ==
Shema was the state Attorney General and Commissioner for Justice (August 1999 - May 2003) during Umaru Musa Yar'Adua's first term as Governor of Katsina State, after which he returned to his private legal practice in Kaduna. In January 2005, he was appointed as a member of the People's Democratic Party (PDP) Special Committee on the Anambra Crisis. He then served as the deputy national chairman (North-west zone) of the People's Democratic Party (September 2005 - November 2006). At the same time, serving as Chairman of the people's Democratic party (PDP) National Disciplinary Committee, and chairman, Governing Council, Peoples Democratic Institute. Shema also served as chairman, National Reconciliation Committee for the South-South PDP (May to June 2006). He also served as a Chairman of the Governing Board of the Nigerian Airspace Management Agency (NAMA) from December 2005 to November 2006, when he won the PDP's ticket to contest the 2007 gubernatorial elections in Katsina State.

== Governor of Katsina State ==
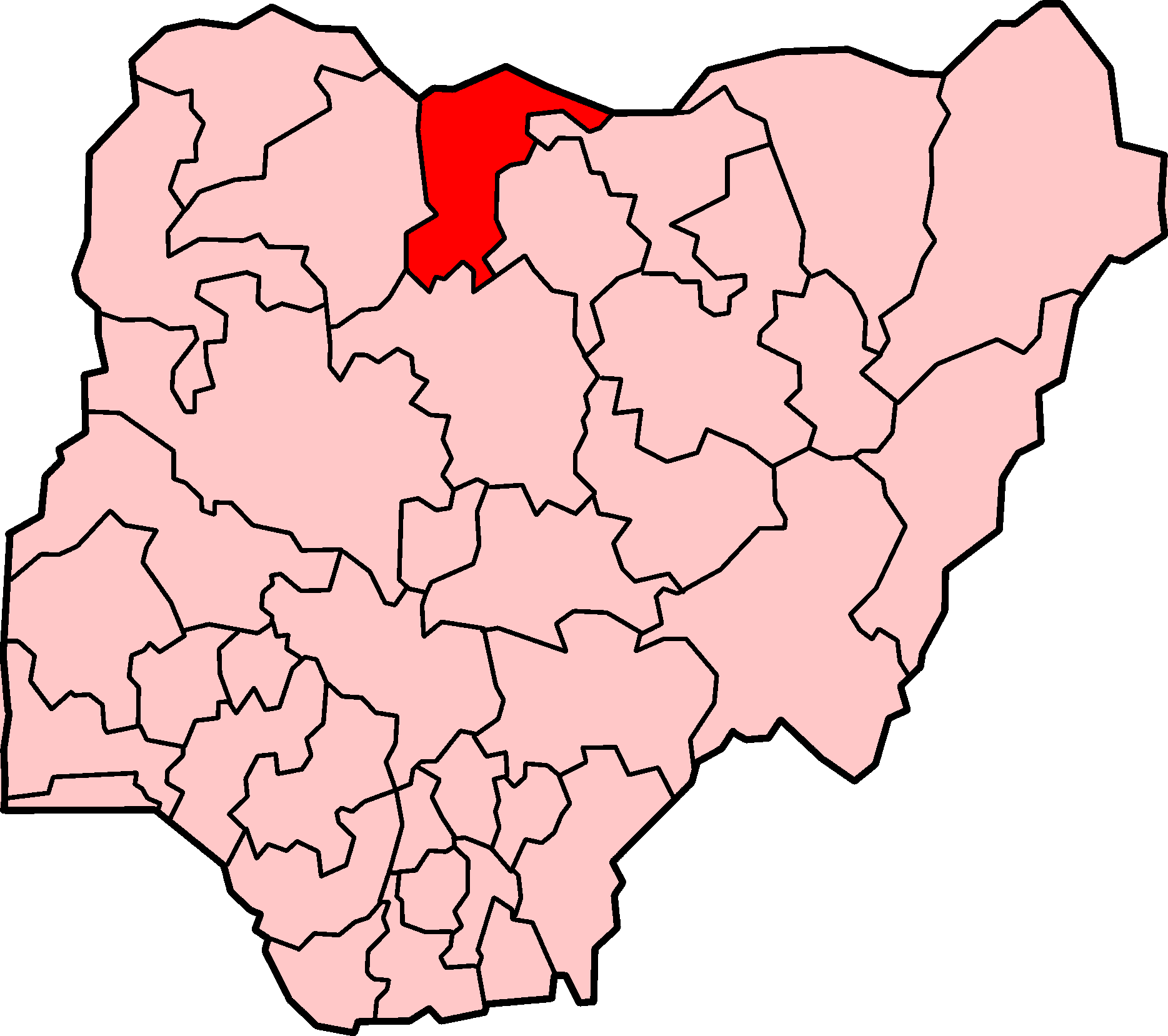
Location of Katsina state in Nigeria

Ibrahim Shema was elected as a Governor of Katsina State on 12 April 2007, as successor to Umaru Yar'Adua, who had been elected president. He took office on 29 May 2007.

Shema was re-elected for another four-year term on 28 April 2011, running on the People's Democratic Party (PDP) political party. Shema won 1,027,912 votes, followed by Masari of the Congress for Progressive Change (CPC) political party with 555,769 votes. The Action Congress of Nigeria (ACN) candidate came third with 19,990 votes.

== Criticisms ==
A PDP leader in Katsina, Tasiu Umar Mashi, died in November 2009, in the office of the Katsina State Commissioner of Police, Danazumi Doma. Controversy over the circumstances leading to his death stirred up tensions between rival PDP factions, one supporting Shema and the other led by the Minister of Agriculture and Water Resources, Dr. Abba Sayyadi Ruma. In December 2010, Shema again won the Peoples democratic party's governorship primaries, in a contest in which he was the only candidate.

== Personal life ==
He married Fatima Ibrahim Shema. They have children, three men and one woman. In 2013, he married Hajiya Maryam Yar'adua, first daughter of former Governor of Katsina and President of the Federal Republic of Nigeria, Umaru Musa Yar'adua. Together, they have one son.

== See also ==
- List of governors of Katsina State
