= List of governors of Bayelsa State =

Governor of Bayelsa State
- Flag of Bayelsa State of Nigeria

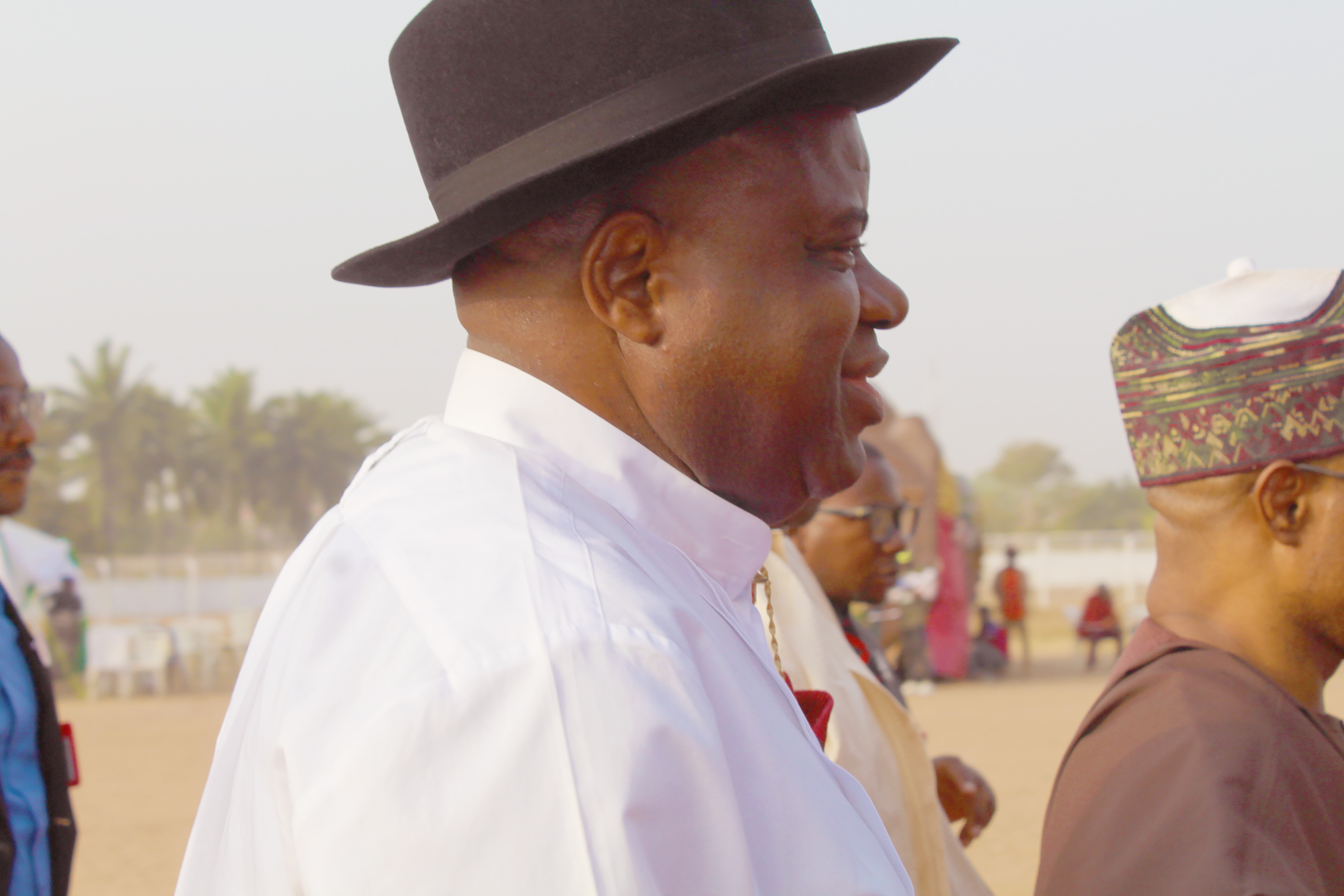
- Incumbent; Douye Diri since 14 February 2020

This is a list of all individuals who have governed Bayelsa State, Nigeria either as administrators or elected governors. Bayelsa State was formed in 1996 from part of Rivers State.

Number	Name	Title	Took office	Left office	Party	Notes
Military Administrator and 1st Governor of Bayelsa State	Phillip Ayeni	Administrator	7 October 1996	28 February 1997	Military	
Military Administrator and 2nd Governor of Bayelsa State	Habu Daura	Administrator	28 February 1997	27 June 1997	Military	
Military Administrator and 3rd Governor of Bayelsa State	Omoniyi Caleb Olubolade	Administrator	27 June 1997	9 July 1998	Military	
Military Administrator 4th Governor of Bayelsa State	Paul Obi	Administrator	9 July 1998	29 May 1999	Military	
5th Governor of Bayelsa State	Diepreye Alamieyeseigha	Governor	29 May 1999	9 December 2005	PDP	
6th Governor of Bayelsa State	Goodluck Jonathan	Governor	9 December 2005	29 May 2007	PDP	
7th Governor of Bayelsa State	Timipre Sylva	Governor	29 May 2007	16 April 2008	PDP	
8th Governor of Bayelsa State	Werinipre Seibarugo	Acting Governor	16 April 2008	27 May 2008		Acting governor after Timipre Sylva's election was nullified.
9th Governor of Bayelsa State	Timipre Sylva	Governor	27 May 2008	27 January 2012	PDP	Re-elected
10th Governor of Bayelsa State	Nestor Binabo	Acting Governor	27 January 2012	14 February 2012		Acting governor after Timipre Sylva's tenure was terminated by the Supreme Court.
11th Governor of Bayelsa State	Henry Dickson	Governor	14 February 2012	14 February 2020	PDP	
12th Governor of Bayelsa State	Duoye Diri	Governor	14 February 2020	Incumbent	PDP	Affirmed Governor-Elect by Supreme Court after he lost the election

== See also ==
- States of Nigeria
- Governor of Bayelsa State
