= List of governors of Gombe State =

This is list of past and present administration rules Gombe State

This is a list of administrators and governors of Gombe State, Nigeria. Gombe State was formed on 1 October 1996 from part of the old Bauchi State by the Sani Abacha military government.

Name	Title	Took office	Left office	Party	Notes
Group Captain Joseph Orji	Administrator	7 Oct 1996	Aug 1998	Military	
Connel M I Bawa	Administrator	Aug 1998	29 May 1999	Military	
Abubakar Habu Hashidu	Governor	29 May 1999	29 May 2003	APP	
Mohammed Danjuma Goje	Governor	29 May 2003	May 2011	PDP	
Ibrahim Hassan Dankwambo	Governor	May 2011	29 May 2019	PDP	
Muhammad Inuwa Yahaya	Governor	May 2019	Incumbent	APC	

== See also ==
- States of Nigeria
- List of state governors of Nigeria

== Sources ==
- "Nigerian Federal States". WorldStatesmen.
