= List of governors of Nasarawa State =

This is a list of administrators and governors of Nasarawa State. Nasarawa State, Nigeria was created on October 1st, 1996 when it was split from Plateau State.

| Name | Title | Took office | Left office | Party | Notes |
|---|---|---|---|---|---|
| Abdullahi Ibrahim | Administrator | 7 October 1996 | 6 August 1998 | (Military) | |
| Bala Mande | Administrator | 6 August 1998 | 29 May 1999 | (Military) | |
| Abdullahi Adamu | Governor | 29 May 1999 | 29 May 2007 | PDP | |
| Aliyu Doma | Governor | 29 May 2007 | May 2011 | PDP | |
| Umaru Tanko Al-Makura | Governor | May 2011 | May 2019 | CPC | |
| Abdullahi Sule | Governor | May 29, 2019 | Incumbent | APC | |

== See also ==
- List of governors of Plateau State
- States of Nigeria
- List of state governors of Nigeria
