= List of governors of Abia State =

Governor of Abia State
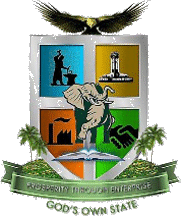
- Seal of Abia State of Nigeria

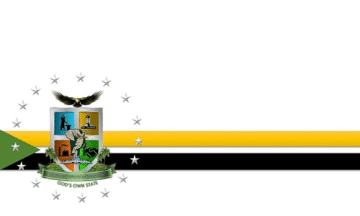
- Flag of Abia State of Nigeria
- Incumbent; Alex Otti since May 2023
- Government of Abia State
- Style: Governor (informal); His Excellency or Your Excellency (courtesy)
- Member of: Executive Council of Abia State
- Reports to: President of Nigeria
- Seat: Umuahia
- Appointer: Popular vote
- Term length: Four years, renewable once consecutively
- Constituting instrument: Constitution of Nigeria
- Inaugural holder: Ogbonnaya Onu
- Formation: January 1992
- Deputy: Deputy governor of Abia State
- Website: abiastate.gov.ng

Location of Abia State in Nigeria

Abia State, located in the South East geopolitical zone of Nigeria, has been governed by a succession of military governors, administrators, and elected governors since its creation in 1991. Before 1991, the area lay within the Eastern Region. After the regional system was dissolved on 27 May 1967 by Major-general Yakubu Gowon during the Nigerian Civil War, the Eastern Region was split into East Central State, Rivers State, and South-Eastern State. (Note: Nigeria's regional system of government was a decentralised political structure where the country was divided into autonomous regions—each with its own legislature, executive, and judiciary—allowing them to govern internal affairs and manage resources independently, while still operating under a central federal authority.) East Central State covered much of the Igbo-speaking area until its division on 3 February 1976 under the military regime of Murtala Mohammed. During the East Central State period, Ukpabi Asika served as administrator until 1975, followed by Anthony Ochefu until the state's dissolution to form Anambra and Imo states. From its creation in 1976, Imo State was governed by military appointees: Ndubuisi Kanu (1976–1977), Adekunle Lawal (1977–1978), and Sunday Ajibade Adenihun (1978–1979). With the advent of the Second Republic in October 1979, Samuel Mbakwe of the Nigerian Peoples Party (NPP) served as the first civilian governor from October 1979 to December 1983. Military rule returned by the end of 1983, and between 1984 and 1992 the state was led by Ike Nwachukwu (1984–1985), Allison Madueke (1985–1985), Amadi Ikwechegh (1986–1990), and Anthony Oguguo (1990–1992).

The state of Abia was established in 1991, and the first administrator appointed was Frank Ajobena (1991–1992). During the Third Republic, Ogbonnaya Onu of the National Republican Convention (NRC) was governor from January 1992 until the November 1993 coup. Subsequent administrators were Chinyere Ike Nwosu (1993–1994), Temi Ejoor (1994–1996), Moses Fasanya (1996–1998) and Anthony Obi (1998–1999). Since the return of democracy under the Fourth Republic in 1999, all of Abia's governors have been elected. The incumbent governor is Alex Otti of the Labour Party (LP), who has been in office since his election in March 2023.

== List of governors ==
=== Eastern Region ===
Before Nigeria's independence in 1960, the territory that now constitutes Imo State was part of the Eastern Region, one of the country's original administrative divisions. During the colonial era, British officials governed the Eastern Region, with Clement Pleass (1954–1956) and Robert Stapledon (1956–1960) serving as governors. After independence, Francis Akanu Ibiam (1960–1966) became the first Nigerian governor of the Eastern Region, while Michael Okpara served as its premier (1960–1966). However, following Nigeria’s first military coup in January 1966, the military abolished the regional system, dismissed civilian premiers, and appointed military administrators, with Chukwuemeka Odumegwu Ojukwu governing the Eastern Region from January 1966 until its dissolution in May 1967. A premier was responsible for the region's executive functions. Administrators were usually appointed to rule a state when there was a political crisis or state of emergency.

=== East Central State ===
East Central State was created on 27 May 1967 by the military government of Yakubu Gowon as part of a national restructuring effort that dissolved the regional system and replaced it with twelve states. The new state was carved out of the former Eastern Region and was composed predominantly of Igbo-speaking populations. Its capital was Enugu.

The state existed from 1967 until 3 February 1976, when it was divided into two separate states—Anambra and Imo—under the nationwide state-creation exercise carried out by the military regime of Murtala Mohammed. During its nine-year existence, East Central State was governed entirely by military-appointed officials. The first was Ukpabi Asika, who was appointed as administrator in 1967 and remained in office until July 1975. His tenure covered the entire duration of the Nigerian Civil War (1967–1970), during which he oversaw the East Central State government's efforts to manage war-related devastation, provide relief, and reintegrate the region into Nigeria. In July 1975, he was replaced by Anthony Ochefu, a military officer who governed the state until its dissolution in February 1976.

A military governor was the head of a state during Nigeria's military era, appointed by the head of the federal military government to administer states, as established by Decree No. 14 of 1967. He exercised executive powers on behalf of the central military government. In contrast, an executive governor is the democratically elected chief executive of a state under the 1999 Constitution, empowered to lead the state government, implement laws, and oversee public administration. The deputy governor is elected on the same ticket as the governor and serves as the second-in-command, assuming the governorship in the event of the governor's death, incapacitation, or resignation, and assisting in administrative duties as assigned.

=== Imo State ===
Imo State was created on 3 February 1976 following the subdivision of the former East Central State into Anambra and Imo States, as part of a nationwide restructuring executed by the military government of Murtala Mohammed. From its creation, Imo has undergone multiple phases of military and civilian governance. The first military governor of Imo State was Ndubuisi Kanu, who governed from March 1976 until 1977. He was succeeded by Adekunle Lawal (1977–1978), followed by Sunday Ajibade Adenihun, who served until the end of military rule in 1979. In the Second Republic, Sam Mbakwe of the Nigerian Peoples Party (NPP) became the first elected civilian governor of Imo State, holding office from October 1979 to December 1983, until the 1983 Nigerian coup d'état ended the civilian administration. Following the coup, military governors resumed control, beginning with Ike Nwachukwu (1984–1985), then Allison Madueke (1985–1986), Amadi Ikwechegh (1986–1990), and Anthony Oguguo from 1990 through 1992, the period Abia State was created.

Heads of the government of Imo State
Governor		Term in office (Note: For elected governors, the date of inauguration is listed.)	Party	Election	D. Governor
Ndubuisi Kanu in military uniform	Ndubuisi Kanu (b. 1943, d. 2021)	March 1976 – August 1977	Military governor	—	Office did not exist
Adekunle Lawal in military uniform	Adekunle Lawal (b. 1934, d. 1980)	10 August 1977 – 23 July 1978	Military governor	—	Office did not exist
—	Sunday Ajibade Adenihun	25 July 1978 – 30 September 1979	Military governor	—	Office did not exist
Bronze statue of Sam Mbakwe in a suit	Sam Mbakwe (b. 1930, d. 2004)	1 October 1979 – 31 December 1983	NPP	1979; 1983	Isaac Uzoigwe (Note: Bernard Amalaha was originally Mbakwe's running mate but Amalaha was disqualified by the Supreme Court, and Mbakwe nominated Uzoigwe as new deputy.)
—	Ike Nwachukwu (b. 1940)	4 January 1984 – 27 August 1985	Military governor	—	Office abolished
—	Allison Madueke (b. 1944)	4 September 1985 – 28 August 1986	Military governor	—	Office abolished
—	Amadi Ikwechegh (b. 1951, d. 2009)	29 August 1986 – 2 September 1990	Military governor	—	Office abolished
—	Anthony Oguguo	3 September 1990 – 2 January 1992	Military governor	—	Office abolished

=== Abia State ===
Abia State was officially created on 27 August 1991 following its separation from the old Imo State. The first governor assigned to Abia was Frank Ajobena, a military administrator who served from August 1991 until January 1992. During the short-lived Third Republic, Ogbonnaya Onu of the National Republican Convention (NRC) served as the state's first civilian governor from January 1992 until the November 1993 military coup. Following the return of military rule, a series of military administrators governed the state. These included Chinyere Ike Nwosu (December 1993 – August 1994), Temi Ejoor (September 1994 – August 1996), Moses Fasanya (August 1996 – August 1998), and Anthony Obi (August 1998 – May 1999).

With the advent of the Fourth Republic in May 1999, Orji Uzor Kalu of the Peoples Democratic Party (PDP) served two terms until 29 May 2007. He was succeeded by Theodore Orji of the Progressive Peoples Alliance (PPA) who won the 2007 election and was re-elected under the umbrella of the Peoples Democratic Party in the 2011 election, serving till 2015. Orji was succeeded by Okezie Ikpeazu of the PDP (2015–2023). In the 2023 gubernatorial elections, Alex Otti of the Labour Party (LP) was elected and sworn in as governor on 29 May 2023. He is the incumbent.

Heads of the government of Abia State
Governor		Term in office (Note: For elected governors, the date of inauguration is listed.)	Party	Election	D. Governor
—	Frank Onawaneryene Ajobena (b. 1949)	August 1991 – January 1992	Military administrator	—	Office did not exist
Ogbonnaya Onu in a traditional Igbo cap	Ogbonnaya Onu (b. 1951, d. 2024)	January 1992 – November 1993	NRC	1991	Chima Nwafor
—	Chinyere Ike Nwosu (b. 1946)	December 1993 – August 1994	Military administrator	—	Office abolished
—	Temi Ejoor (b. 1948)	August 1994 – August 1996	Military administrator	—	Office abolished
—	Moses Fasanya (b. 1948)	August 1996 – August 1998	Military administrator	—	Office abolished
—	Anthony Uzoma Obi (b. 1952, d. 2022)	August 1998 – May 1999	Military administrator	—	Office abolished
—	Orji Uzor Kalu (b. 1960)	29 May 1999 – 29 May 2007	PDP	1999; 2003	Eyinnaya Abaribe (May 1999–March 2003) (Note: Resigned)
—	Orji Uzor Kalu (b. 1960)	29 May 1999 – 29 May 2007	PDP	1999; 2003	Chima Nwafor (March 2003–March 2006) (Note: Died)
—	Orji Uzor Kalu (b. 1960)	29 May 1999 – 29 May 2007	PDP	1999; 2003	Acho Nwakanma (March 2006–May 2007)
Theodore Orji in a traditional Igbo cap	Theodore Orji (b. 1950)	29 May 2007 – 29 May 2015	PPA	2007; 2011	Chris Akomas (May 2007–July 2010) (Note: Resigned)
Theodore Orji in a traditional Igbo cap	Theodore Orji (b. 1950)	29 May 2007 – 29 May 2015	PDP	2007; 2011	Acho Nwakanma (July 2010–May 2011)
Theodore Orji in a traditional Igbo cap	Theodore Orji (b. 1950)	29 May 2007 – 29 May 2015	PDP	2007; 2011	Emeka Ananaba (May 2011–May 2015)
—	Okezie Ikpeazu (b. 1964)	29 May 2015 – 29 May 2023	PDP	2015; 2019	Ude Oko Chukwu
—	Alex Chioma Otti (b. 1965)	29 May 2023 – Incumbent	LP	2023	Ikechukwu Emetu

== See also ==
- Governor of Abia State
- List of state governors of Nigeria
