= Deputy governor of Abia State =

Second highest-ranking official in the executive branch of Abia State in Nigeria

Deputy Governor of Abia State
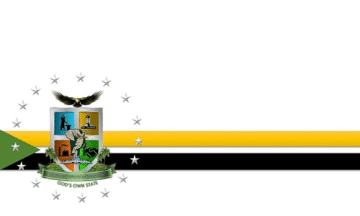
- Flag of Abia State
- Incumbent; Ikechukwu Emetu since 29 May 2023
- Executive Branch of the Abia State Government
- Style: Deputy Governor (informal); His Excellency (courtesy)
- Status: Second highest executive branch officer
- Member of: Abia State Executive Branch; Abia State Cabinet
- Seat: Umuahia
- Nominator: Gubernatorial candidate
- Appointer: Direct popular election or, if vacant, Governor via House of Assembly confirmation
- Term length: Four years renewable once
- Constituting instrument: Constitution of Nigeria
- Inaugural holder: Enyinnaya Abaribe (Fourth Republic)
- Succession: First
- Website: abiastate.gov.ng

The deputy governor of Abia State is the second-highest officer in the executive branch of the government of Abia State, Nigeria, after the governor of Abia State, and ranks first in line of succession. The deputy governor is directly elected together with the governor to a four-year term of office.

Ikechukwu Emetu is the current deputy governor, having assumed office on 29 May 2023.

== Qualifications ==
As in the case of the governor, in order to be qualified to be elected as deputy governor, a person must:

- be at least thirty-five (35) years of age;
- be a Nigerian citizen by birth;
- be a member of a political party with endorsement by that political party;
- have School Certificate or its equivalent.

== Responsibilities ==
The deputy governor assists the governor in exercising primary assignments and is also eligible to replace a dead, impeached, absent or ill governor as required by the 1999 Constitution of Nigeria.

== List of deputy governors ==
Name	Took office	Left office	Time in office	Party	Elected	Governor
Chima Nwafor (1948–2006)	3 January 1992	17 November 1993	1 year, 318 days	National Republican Convention	1991	Ogbonnaya Onu
Enyinnaya Abaribe (born 1955)	29 May 1999	7 March 2003	3 years, 282 days	Peoples Democratic Party	1999	Orji Uzor Kalu
Chima Nwafor (1948–2006)	March 2003	21 March 2006	3 years	Peoples Democratic Party	2003	Orji Uzor Kalu
Acho Nwakanma (born 1958)	March 2006	29 May 2007	1 year, 2 months	Progressive Peoples Alliance		Orji Uzor Kalu
Chris Akomas (born 1960)	29 May 2007	30 July 2010	3 years, 62 days	Progressive Peoples Alliance	2007	Theodore Orji
Acho Nwakanma (born 1958)	18 August 2010	29 May 2011	284 days	Peoples Democratic Party		Theodore Orji
Emeka Ananaba (born 1945)	29 May 2011	29 May 2015	4 years	Peoples Democratic Party	2011	Theodore Orji
Ude Oko Chukwu (born 1962)	29 May 2015	29 May 2023	8 years	Peoples Democratic Party	2015; 2019	Okezie Ikpeazu
Ikechukwu Emetu (born 1985)	29 May 2023	Incumbent	3 years, 101 days	Labour Party	2023	Alex Otti

== See also ==
- Governor of Abia State
- Government of Abia State
