= List of governors of Imo State =

Governor of Imo State
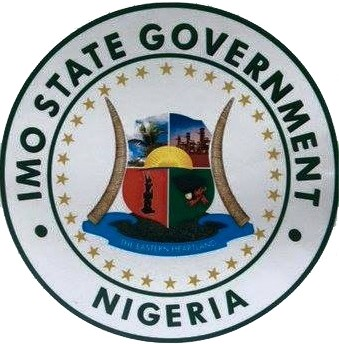
- Seal of Imo State of Nigeria

- Flag of Imo State of Nigeria
- Incumbent; Hope Uzodimma since January 2020

This is a list of administrators and governors of Imo State, Nigeria. Imo State was created on 17 March 1976 from part of East Central State.

Name	Title	Took office	Left office	Party	Notes
Ndubuisi Kanu	Governor	Mar 1976	1977	Military	
Adekunle Lawal	Governor	1977	Jul 1978	Military	
Sunday Ajibade Adenihun	Governor	Jul 1978	Oct 1979	Military	
Samuel Onunaka Mbakwe	Governor	1 Oct 1979	31 Dec 1983	NPP	Nigerian Second Republic
Ike Nwachukwu	Governor	Jan 1984	Aug 1985	Military	
Allison Amakoduna Madueke	Governor	Aug 1985	1986	Military	
Amadi Ikwechegh	Governor	1986	1990	Military	
Anthony E. Oguguo	Governor	Aug 1990	Jan 1992	Military	
Evan Enwerem	Governor	Jan 1992	Nov 1993	NRC	Nigerian Third Republic
James N.J. Aneke	Administrator	9 Dec 1993	22 Aug 1996	Military	
Tanko Zubairu	Administrator	22 Aug 1996	May 1999	Military	
Achike Udenwa	Governor	29 May 1999	29 May 2007	PDP	Nigerian Fourth Republic
Ikedi G. Ohakim	Governor	29 May 2007	29 May 2011	PPA / PDP	
Owelle Rochas Anayo Okorocha	Governor	29 May 2011	29 May 2019	APC	
Emeka Ihedioha	Governor	29 May 2019	15 January 2020	PDP	
Hope Uzodinma	Governor	15 January 2020	Incumbent	APC	
