= Abia State =

State in the South East, Nigeria

Abia
- State
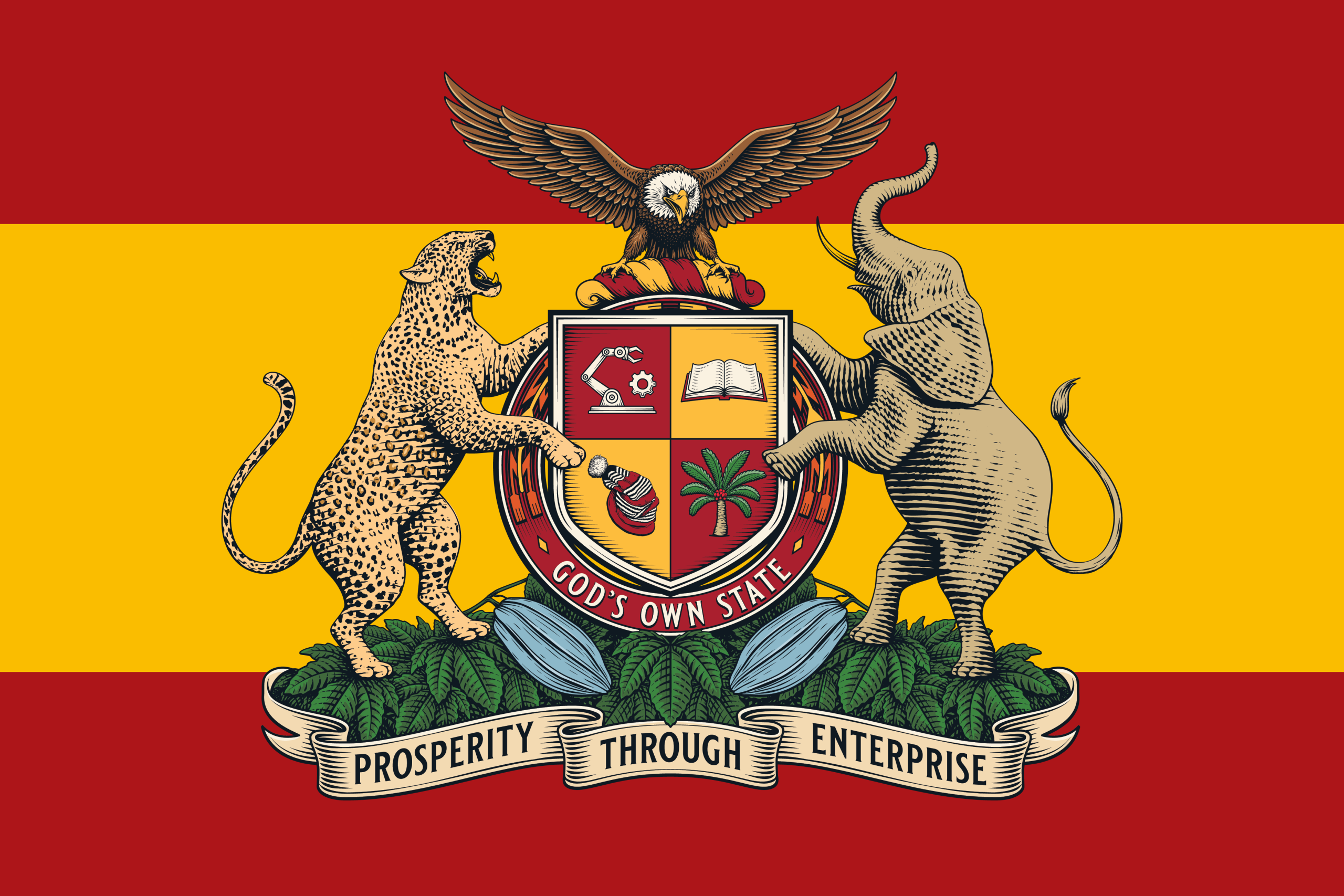
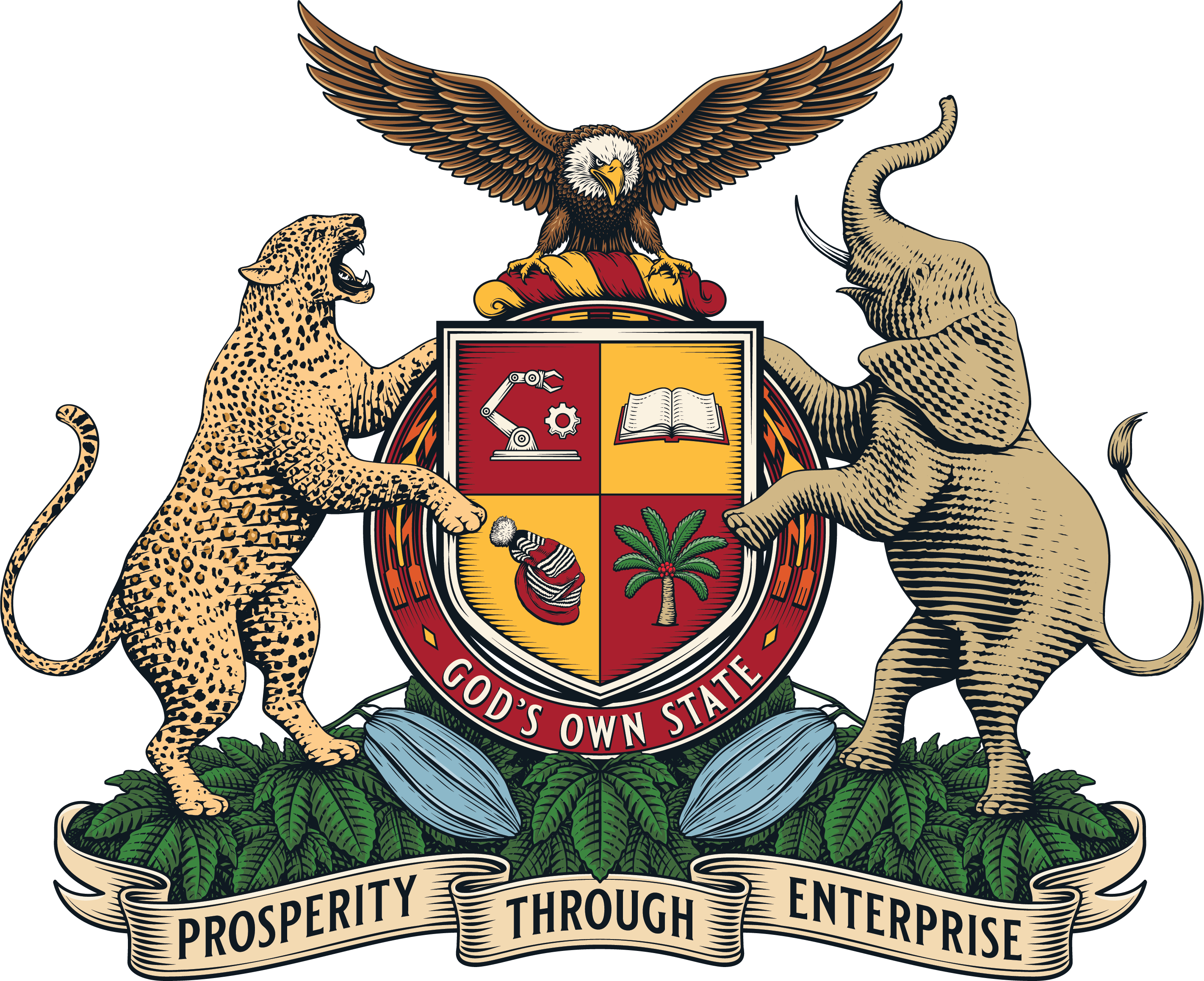
- Flag Seal
- Nicknames: God's Own State; Igbo: Ọ̀hà nke Chineke
- Location of Abia State in Nigeria
- Coordinates: 5°25′N 7°30′E
- Country: Nigeria
- LGAs: 17
- Date created: 27 August 1991; 35 years ago
- Capital: Umuahia

Government
  - Body: Government of Abia State
  - Governor: Alex Otti (LP)
  - Deputy Governor: Ikechukwu Emetu (LP)
  - Legislature: Abia State House of Assembly
  - Senators: Central: Austin Akobundu (PDP); North: Orji Uzor Kalu (APC); South:Enyinnaya Abaribe (APGA)
  - Representatives: List

Area
  - Total: 6,320 km^{2} (2,440 sq mi)
  - Rank: 32nd of 36

Population (2022 est)
  - Total: 4,143,100
  - Rank: 26th of 36
  - Density: 656/km^{2} (1,700/sq mi)
- Demonym: Ndi Abia

GDP (PPP)
  - Year: 2021
  - Total: $22.83 billion 18th of 36
  - Per capita: $5,351; 9th of 36
- Time zone: UTC+01 (WAT)
- Postal code: 440001
- ISO 3166 code: NG-AB
- Language: Igbo; English
- HDI (2022): 0.622 medium · 6th of 37
- Website: abiastate.gov.ng

Abia (Igbo: Alaọha Abia) is a state in the Southeastern region of Nigeria. The state's capital is Umuahia and its most populous city is Aba. The legislature is the Abia State House of Assembly.

One of the smallest states in Nigeria, Abia is bordered to the west by Imo, east by Cross River, south by Rivers, northwest by Anambra and northeast by Enugu and Ebonyi. The state is divided between the Niger Delta swamp forests in the south and the Cross–Niger transition forests. The Imo and Aba Rivers flows along the state's western and southern borders respectively. Known for producing crude oil and natural gas, Abia ranks eighth by Human Development Index since 2019.

The name "Abia" is an abbreviation of Abia state's four densely populated regions Aba, Bende, Isuikwuato, and Arochukwu. Abia's slogan is "God's own state". Abia is one of the 36 states in Nigeria, and has seventeen local government areas. It was created on 27 August 1991 out of Imo State by General Ibrahim Babangida, and it is located in the south-eastern part of Nigeria with Umuahia as the capital, and Aba as the commercial city.

Abia State's history begins as part of the Aro Confederacy until its defeat in the early 1900s by the British troops during the Anglo-Aro War. After the war, the area was incorporated into the Southern Nigeria Protectorate of British Nigeria. After Nigeria's independence in 1960, Abia became part of the Eastern Region until 1967 before the region was split, and it became part of the East Central State. The Eastern Region attempted to secede in Nigerian Civil War with Abia as part of the secessionist state of Biafra. After the war and the then reunification of Nigeria, the East Central State was merged until 1976 when Imo including Abia, was formed by Murtala Muhammed. Eastern Imo would later become the old Abia State after a split. In 1996, part of Abia's northeast was removed to form a part of the new Ebonyi.

The Igbo people make up 100 percent of the state's population and the official language is Igbo. There are over 3 million Christians. Catholic Hierarchy analyses that there are 689,668 Catholics (2020) in Diocese of Umuahia with over 70 parishes, and Aba Diocese with over 90 parishes, both suffragans of the Archdiocese of Owerri.

== History ==
Abia State was created from Imo State by Ibrahim Babangida on 27 August 1991.

== Geography ==
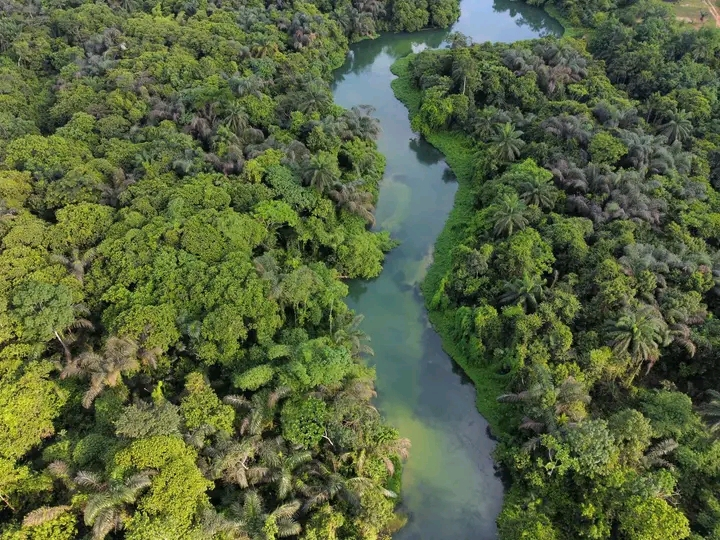
Azumini Blue River in Abia state, Nigeria

Abia State occupies about 4902 square kilometres. It is bounded on the north and northeast by the states of Enugu for about 25 km, and Ebonyi for 70 km (43 miles), Cross River State for about 52 km (partly across Cross River) and Akwa Ibom State for 151 km (94 miles) to the east and southeast respectively, Rivers State to the south and west for 87 km (54 miles), Imo State and Anambra to the west for to the west in the vicinity of the Imo River for about 18 km and about 104 km respectively. The southernmost part of the State lies within the Niger Delta Swamp Forests, while the rest of the state, lies within the Cross–Niger transition forests. The southern portion gets heavy rainfall of about 2,400 millimetres (94 in) per year and it is intense between the months of April through October. The most important rivers in Abia State are the Imo and Aba Rivers which flow into the Atlantic Ocean through Akwa Ibom State.

=== Administration ===
Abia State has 17 local government areas (LGAs), they are:

- Aba North
- Aba South
- Arochukwu
- Bende
- Ikwuano
- Isiala Ngwa North
- Isiala Ngwa South
- Isuikwuato
- Obi Ngwa
- Ohafia
- Osisioma Ngwa
- Ugwunagbo
- Ukwa East
- Ukwa West
- Umuahia North
- Umuahia South
- Umu Nneochi

These local government areas also contain numerous villages.

=== Environmental Issues ===
==== Solid waste ====
Municipal solid waste management (MSWM) deals with the collection, storing, treatment and disposal of solid waste, to ensure that it does not affect humans, living things and the environment at large. There are factors that influence Municipal solid waste generation such as income level, local climatic condition, urbanization and economic development. MSW in Aba, Abia State is classified into;

1. Domestic waste (waste from households, food centers, markets, and commercial premises)
2. Industrial waste (excluding toxic waste that requires special handling)
3. Institutional waste (waste from government establishments, schools, hospitals and recreational facilities

In recent times, it was reported that Aba and Umuahia generate up to two hundred and seventy truckloads of domestic and commercial waste daily. This information was made known to the public by Governor Alex Otti during his inauguration speech after taking the baton of government from the former governor, Okezie Ikpeazu.

=== Climate ===
Aba experiences a warm and gloomy wet season as well as a scorching and oppressive dry season. The temperature rarely drops below 16 °C (61 °F) or rises over 33 °C (91 °F) throughout the entire year, fluctuating between 20 and 31 °C (68 and 88 °F).

The beach/pool score indicates that the best time of year to visit Aba for hot-weather activities is from late November to early February.

Aba experiences relatively little seasonal variation in temperature, making the distinction between hot and cold seasons less meaningful.

== Demographics ==
=== Religion ===
The residents of Abia state are predominantly Christians and most are Catholics. The catholic dioceses of Umuahia, established in 1958 and Aba, established in 1990 are the two catholic dioceses located in Abia State with 70 and 90 parishes respectively. They are both suffragans of Owerri Archdiocese.

The Aba Province of Anglican Church of Nigeria led by Archbishop Isaac Nwaobia comprises the nine Dioceses of Aba led by Bishop Christian Ugwuzo, Aba Ngwa North (2007) led by Bishop Nathan Kanu, Arochukwu/Ohafia led by Bishop Johnson Onuoha, Ikwanuo led by Bishop Chigozirim Onyegbule, Isiala Ngwa led by Bishop Temple Nwaogu, Isial-Ngwa South led by Bishop Isaac Nwaobia, Isikwuato led by Bishop Manasses Chijiokem Okere, Ukwa led by Bishop Samuel Kelechi Eze, and Umuahia led by Bishop Geoffrey Obijuru Ibeabuchi.

There are also other pentecostal churches located within Abia State including Living Faith Church which has more than 100 branches within the state.

== Economy ==
Crude oil and gas production is a prominent activity, as it contributes over 39% of the State's GDP. However, the indigenous oil companies – through the Marginal Fields Programme (MFP) – have not found it easy to attract the requisite funding and infrastructural capacity, to explore some of the marginal oil fields which are about 50 in the State.

The manufacturing sector only accounts for 2% of the GDP. The industrial centre of the state is in Aba, with textile manufacturing, pharmaceuticals, soap, plastics, cement, footwear, and cosmetics. In addition to the above, Abia State Government built a 9,000 capacity multipurpose International Conference Centre in Umuahia. This edifice of international standard was built by Governor T.A. Orji, to enhance tourism as well as boost the state economy, through hosting of major international and local events.

Representing 27% of the GDP, agriculture – which employs 70% of the state workforce – is the second economic sector of Abia. With its adequate seasonal rainfall, Abia has much arable land that produces yams, maize, potatoes, rice, cashews, plantains, taro, and cassava. Oil palm is the most important cash crop.

=== Oil and gas exploration ===
There are over 100 oil wells and 3 installed flow stations in Abia State. There is also an associated gas plant, Abia/NNPC gas plant. As of 2012, boundary Commission said it returned 42 oil wells from neighbouring Rivers State to Abia. This makes Abia the fourth largest oil-producing state in the country. Oil giant, Shell, holds most of the licenses for the wells in the State, and has concentrated on the estimated 50 wells that are considered high-yield.

The state produced 36,000 barrels of crude oil per day; "Imoturu produces 23,000 barrels per day and Isimili flow station produces over 8,000 barrels of crude oil per day. Then four oil wells in Izaku go to Obigo flow station. About 30 oil wells from my village go to Umuri, and about eight oil wells from Umurie go to Afam", said Samuel Okezie Nwogu, Chairman of Abia State Oil Producing Development Area Commission (ASOPADEC). However, the State has complained of poor funding from its oil revenue federal allocation.

== Education ==
Abia state's public and private secondary schools, according to a document by the Ministry of Education, had a student–teacher ratio of 8:1 to 12:1 from 2013 to 2016 school year. All school divisions must adhere to educational standards set forth by the Abia State Ministry of Education. In 2016, 13,699 students (5,512 males and 8,187 females) were enrolled in public schools while 14,798 (7,068 males and 7,730 females) were enrolled in private schools. In 2017, 13,351 students (5,517 males and 7,834 females) were enrolled in the public schools, while 39,280 students (19,260 males and 20,020 females) were enrolled in private schools. According to the National Bureau of Statistics, there exists, as of 2016, 168 public schools and 194 private schools, and, as of 2017, 233 public schools and 1,095 private schools.

In 2016, 3859 students graduated from public high schools while 5419 graduated from private schools. In 2017, 3691 graduated from public schools while 11,707 graduated from private schools. As of 2025 Goodluck Ubochi serves as the Commissioner for Basic and Secondary Education while Uche Eme serves as the Commissioner for Tertiary Education.

=== Colleges and universities ===
According to The Guardian, Abia had a literacy level of 94.24 percent in 2017 after Imo, Lagos, and Ekiti States. The Ministry of Education recognizes 5 universities in Abia; one federal, one state, and three privately-owned universities. In the 2025 Unirank ranking of universities, Michael Okpara University of Agriculture ranked 57th, Abia State University is 67th, Gregory University is 94th, Rhema University is 105th, Clifford University is 147th, and Spiritan University, Nneochi is 161st.

Abia State University, founded in 1981 is the only state university and the oldest in Abia. Lux Mundi University became the first private university in Umuahia, the state capital. In 2024, the state under Governor Alex Otti, adopted a policy of free and compulsory basic education for all the state's residents as well as non-indigenes which took effect in January 2025.

== Transportation ==
The nearest airport to Abia is Sam Mbakwe Cargo Airport (Owerri Airport), it is an hour drive to Umuahia and Aba. It is two hours' drive to Port Harcourt International Airport. Akwa Ibom Airport (Akwa Ibom State) can also serve would-be visitors. The distance between Uyo (Akwa Ibom) and Umuahia (Abia) is 73.28 kilometres (45.53 mi).

Rail transport is also available in the state. Aba is connected to Port Harcourt by rail, Umuahia is connected to Aba and Enugu by rail. The coastal parts of the State are equally accessible using boats and canoes.

Federal Highways are;

- A3 northeast from Port Harcourt (Rivers State) via Umuahia, Umuokwara (Imo State) and across the north of Abia State again via Lokpaukwu to Enugu State,
- F103 east from Akwa Ibom via Ikot Ubo to Oron,
- F104 from Aba via Azumini, Etinam, and Ndiya to F103 at Ikot Ubo,
- F107 from Umuahia via Bende to F234 in Ohafia,
- F108 from Arochukwu, in the southeast, via Ikot Okpora and Orira to A4,
- F112 the Okigwe-Afikpo road east from Imo State via Okigwe to Ebonyi State.

Other major roads includes;

- Southeast from Okigwe to Amiyi-Uhu (Ogboro Junction) to Amaba
- The Ahaba-Umunekwu east and south from Amaba as the Ohafia-Ogo Ubi-Agu Eze Road to join the Umuahia-Ohafia Road,
- The Umuahia Rd south to Akwa Ibom,
- The Obohia-Azumini Rd east to Akwa Ibom,
- North from A3 at Uzuaku to Owaza (Rivers State),
- The Asa-Akwere-Obohia Road west from A3 at Obehie Junction to Owaza
- The Eberi-Umu Uyo Road southwest from A6 at Umuvo to Rivers State.

== Politics ==
The State Government is led by a democratically elected Governor who works closely with members of the state's House of Assembly. The capital city of the state is Umuahia, and there are 17 local government areas in the state.

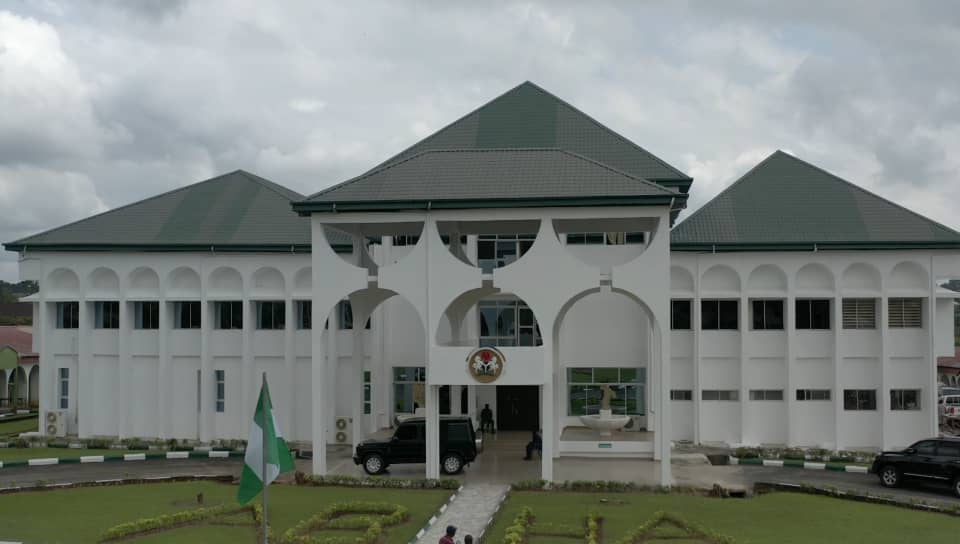
Abia State House of Assembly, Nigeria

At statehood in 1991, Abia was ruled by Ibrahim Babangida-appointed Military Administrator Frank Ajobena before Ogbonnaya Onu was elected governor later that year under the Third Nigerian Republic. Onu governed for nearly two years before Sani Abacha ended the Third Republic and reinstated full military rule. Under the Abacha regime, three more Military Administrators (Chinyere Ike Nwosu, Temi Ejoor, and Moses Fasanya) were appointed before Abacha's death and the accession of Abdulsalami Abubakar. Abubakar appointed one more Military Administrator, Anthony Obi, before starting the transition to democracy in 1998.

In 1999, Nigeria returned to democracy, and Orji Uzor Kalu was elected governor on the platform of the People's Democratic Party. Consequently, he was sworn in on 29 May 1999. In 2003, when it was time for fresh elections, Kalu re-contested on the platform of the PDP and got a second mandate to govern (the Constitution of Nigeria limits Governors to two terms in office). At the end of Kalu's term in 2007, Theodore Orji (PPA) defeated Onyema Ugochukwu (PDP) in the 2007 gubernatorial election, to become Abia's next Governor. In 2011, Theodore Orji defected from the PPA to the PDP before being re-elected for another four-year term later that year.

In 2015, Okezie Ikpeazu (PDP) was voted in as the ninth Governor of Abia State. Four years later, he won re-election, defeating Uche Ogah of the All Progressives Congress and Alex Otti of APGA to be sworn in as Governor for a second term on 29 May 2019. In Abia State, 70 percent of politicians belong to the PDP.

In 2023, Alex Otti of the Labour Party Nigeria (LP) emerged as the eleventh governor of the state having defeated the candidate of the PDP in a fiercely contested race.

=== Electoral system ===
The electoral system of each state is selected using a modified two-round system. To be elected in the first round, a candidate must receive the plurality of the vote and over 25% of the vote in at least two -third of the State local government Areas. If no candidate passes threshold, a second round will be held between the top candidate and the next candidate to have received a plurality of votes in the highest number of local government Areas.

== Culture ==
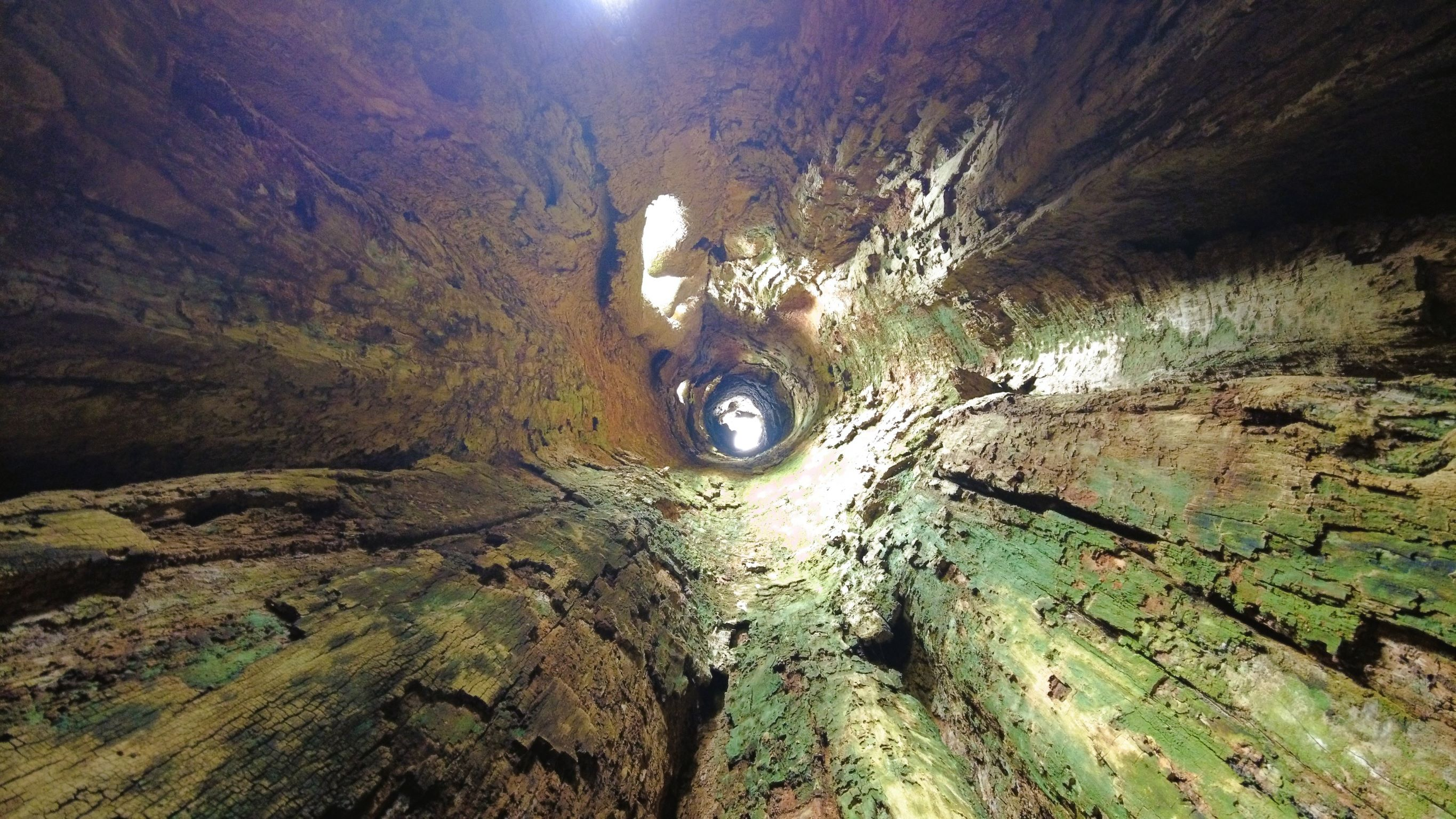
Inside view of Amakama living Tree with a wooden cave in Abia State, Nigeria

Tourist destinations include:

- Arochukwu, which is associated with slave trade.
- Azumini Blue River waterside
- The Amakama wooden cave; a hollow tree that can accommodate up to twenty people.
- Caves located in the north, ranging from Umunneochi to Arochukwu.
- Traditional festivals and dances
- National War Museum, Umuahia and Ojukwu Bunker in Umuahia
- Museum of Colonial History in Aba
- "Akwete" cloth weaving at Ukwa-East LGA
- Ohafia War Dancers
- Amafor-Isingwu biannual Iza aha ceremony
- Ekpe Festival in Umuahia
- Ezumezu Festival in Igbere, Bende (held triennially)
