= 1979 Imo State gubernatorial election =

1979 gubernatorial election in Imo State, Nigeria

- July 28, 1979
Nominee	Samuel Onunaka Mbakwe	Collins Obi
Party	NPP	NPN
Running mate	Bernard Amalaha
Governor before election
Sunday Ajibade Adenihun
Nigerian military junta
Elected Governor
Samuel Mbakwe
NPP

The 1979 Imo State gubernatorial election occurred on July 28, 1979, in Nigeria. NPP's Samuel Onunaka Mbakwe won election for a first term to become Imo State's first executive governor leading and, defeating main opposition, NPN's Collins Obi, in the contest.

Sam Mbakwe emerged winner in the gubernatorial primary election. His running mate was Bernard Amalaha (Amalaha was disqualified after the election and Isaac Uzoigwe was appointed in his stead).

President Shehu Shagari In 1979 was handed the new civilian government.

== Electoral system ==
The Governor of Imo State is elected using the plurality voting system.

== Results ==
There were five political parties registered by the Federal Electoral Commission (FEDECO) to participate in the election. Samuel Mbakwe of the NPP won the contest by polling the highest votes, defeating NPN's Collins Obi.

Candidate	Party
Samuel Onunaka Mbakwe	Nigerian People's Party (NPP)
Collins Obi	National Party of Nigeria (NPN)
Nwakama Okoro	
Total
Source: GARJ, Africa Spectrum
