= Priscilla Otti =

First Lady of Abia State, Nigeria

First Lady of Abia State
- Governor: Alex Otti
- Preceded by: Nkechi Ikpeazu

Personal details
- Born: December 22, 1970 (age 55) Aba, Abia State, Nigeria
- Spouse: Alex Otti
- Occupation: Entrepreneur

Priscilla Otti (born 22 December 1970) is a Nigerian politician and entrepreneur. She is the current First Lady of Abia State as the wife of Alex Otti, the State's governor.

== Biography ==
Priscilla Otti was born on December 22, 1970, in Aba, Abia State. She had her high school education at Girls High School in Aba and later studied Economics at the University of Nigeria, Nsukka.

After graduating, she worked as a banker before becoming an entrepreneur.

As First Lady, she has been an advocate for the rights of girls and women, and fighting gender-based violence and have been outspoken on empowering women. She has also supported childcare movements through donations and has engaged in community development by commissioning educational and healthcare projects in Abia State.

In 2026, she collaborated on a project "Flow with Confidence Sanitary Pad Initiative" along with the First Lady of Nigeria, Remi Tinubu, a programme aimed at improving hygiene and menstrual health among girls in schools.

As an entrepreneur, she is the CEO of Silhouette Fashion House, a women's fashion brand.

She is married to Alex Otti and they have three children.
