= 1999 Abia State gubernatorial election =

1999 gubernatorial election in Abia State, Nigeria

- January 9, 1999
Nominee	Orji Uzor Kalu
Party	PDP	All People's Party (Nigeria)
Running mate	Eyinnaya Abaribe
Popular vote	370,025	173,873
Governor before election
Anthony Obi
Nigerian military junta
Elected Governor
Orji Uzor Kalu
PDP

The 1999 Abia State gubernatorial election occurred in Nigeria on January 9, 1999. The PDP nominee Orji Uzor Kalu won the election, defeating the APP candidate.

Orji Uzor Kalu won the PDP nomination at the primary election. His running mate was Eyinnaya Abaribe.

== Electoral system ==
The Governor of Abia State is elected using the plurality voting system.

== Results ==
PDP's Orji Uzor Kalu emerged winner in the contest.

The total number of registered voters in the state for the election was 1,321,895. However, only 1,321,400 were previously issued voting cards in the state.

Candidate	Party	Votes	%
Orji Uzor Kalu	People's Democratic Party (PDP)	370,025	51.55
All People's Party (APP)	173,873	24.22	
Alliance for Democracy (AD)	173,873	24.22	
Total		717,771	100.00
Registered voters/turnout		1,321,895	–
Source: Nigeria World, IFES
