= Ejoor =

Ejoor is a surname. Notable people with the surname include:

- David Ejoor (1932–2019), Nigerian politician and general
- Temi Ejoor, Military administrator of Enugu State, Nigeria
