= 2015 Abia State gubernatorial election =

- 25 April 2015
Nominee	Okezie Ikpeazu	Alex Otti
Party	PDP	APGA
Popular vote	264,713	180,882
Percentage	59.4%	40.6%
Governor before election
Theodore Orji
PPA
Elected Governor
Okezie Ikpeazu
PDP

The Abia State gubernatorial election, 2015 was the fifth gubernatorial election of Abia State. Held on 25 April 2015, the People's Democratic Party nominee Okezie Ikpeazu won the election, defeating Alex Otti of the All Progressives Grand Alliance.

== Results ==
2015 gubernatorial election, Abia State
Party	Candidate	Votes	%	±%
PDP	Okezie Ikpeazu	264,713	59.4	▼33.4
APGA	Alex Otti	180,882	40.6	▲33.4
Majority		83,831	18.8	▼66.9
Turnout		445,595	100	▼35.5
PDP hold		Swing	▼66.9	
