= 1983 Imo State gubernatorial election =

1983 gubernatorial election in Imo State, Nigeria

- August 13, 1983
Nominee	Sam Mbakwe
Party	NPP
Governor before election
Sam Mbakwe
NPP
Elected Governor
Sam Mbakwe
NPP

The 1983 Imo State gubernatorial election occurred in Nigeria on August 13, 1983. The NPP nominee Sam Mbakwe won the election, defeating other candidates.

Sam Mbakwe emerged NPP candidate.

== Electoral system ==
The Governor of Imo State is elected using the plurality voting system.

== Primary election ==
=== NPP primary ===
The NPP primary election was won by Sam Mbakwe.

== Results ==
Candidate	Party
Sam Mbakwe	Nigerian People's Party
Total
Source: World States Men
