= 2003 Abia State gubernatorial election =

2003 gubernatorial election in Abia State, Nigeria

- (Nigeria)
- April 19, 2003
Nominee	Orji Uzor Kalu	Eyinnaya Abaribe
Party	PDP	ANPP
Running mate	Chima Nwafor
Popular vote	540,983
Governor before election
Orji Uzor Kalu
PDP
Elected Governor
Orji Uzor Kalu
PDP

The 2003 Abia State gubernatorial election occurred on April 19, 2003. Incumbent Governor, PDP's Orji Uzor Kalu won election for a second term, defeating his former deputy, ANPP's Eyinnaya Abaribe, and two other candidates.

Orji Uzor Kalu won the PDP nomination at the primary election. His running mate was Chima Nwafor.

== Electoral system ==
The Governor of Abia State is elected using the plurality voting system.

== Results ==
A total of four candidates registered with the Independent National Electoral Commission to contest in the election. PDP candidate Orji Uzor Kalu won election for a second term, defeating three other candidates.

The total number of registered voters in the state was 1,285,428. However, only 64.05% (i.e. 823,347) of registered voters participated in the exercise.

Candidate	Party	Votes	%
Orji Uzor Kalu	People's Democratic Party (PDP)	540,983	100.00
Eyinnaya Abaribe	All Nigeria Peoples Party (ANPP)		
Onwuka Kalu	All Progressives Grand Alliance (APGA)		
Rowland Nwafor	Peoples Mandate Party (PMP)		
Total		540,983	100.00
Registered voters/turnout		1,285,428	–
Source: Gamji, Africa Update, Dawodu
