= Okezie Ikpeazu =

Nigerian politician

Nigeria Ambassador to Spain
- Incumbent
- Assumed office 14 September 2026
- President: Bola Tinubu

9th Governor of Abia State
- In office 29 May 2015 – 29 May 2023
- Deputy: Ude Oko Chukwu
- Preceded by: Theodore Orji
- Succeeded by: Alex Otti

1st Deputy General Manager of Abia State Environmental Protection Agency
- In office 5 May 2013 – 10 October 2014

General Manager of the Abia State Passenger Integrated Manifest Scheme ASPIMS
- In office March 2011 – 5 May 2013

Chairman of the Governing Council of Abia State College of Health Technology
- In office June 2010 – 29 May 2011

General Manager of Abia State Passenger Integrated Manifest Scheme ASPIMS
- In office 2007–2009

Chairman of Obingwa Local Government Area
- In office 2002–2003

Personal details
- Born: 18 October 1964 (age 61) Abia State, Nigeria
- Party: People's Democratic Party (2002-2006, 2010–present); Progressive Peoples Alliance (2006–2010)
- Spouse(s): Nkechi Ikpeazu, (nee Nwakanma)
- Children: 4

Okezie Victor Ikpeazu // (born 18 October 1964) is a Nigerian politician and former Governor of Abia State, who was in office from 29 May 2015 to 29 May 2023. He was elected on the platform of the Peoples Democratic Party. He was re-elected as the Governor of Abia state at the 9 March 2019 gubernatorial election. He ran for election at the 2023 Senatorial election for Abia South Senatorial District but came a distant third behind incumbent Senator Enyinnaya Abaribe of All Progressive Grand Alliance and a political newbie Chinedu Onyeizu of the Labour Party.

== Early life and professional career ==
Okezie was born on 18 October 1964, to the family of late Pa Ishmael and Deaconess Bessie Ikpeazu of Umuebere in Umuobiakwa village, Isialaukwu, Mbato Autonomous Community in Obingwa Local Government Area of Abia State, Nigeria. Ikpeazu attended Amaise Central Primary School, Umuobiakwa. In 1973, while in primary five, he gained admission into Eziama High School, Aba and later moved to Ihie High School, Isiala Ngwa where he took his School certificate examination in 1979. In 1980, at the age of 16, he gained admission into the University of Maiduguri to study Clinical Biochemistry and graduated with a B.Sc. (Hons.) Second Class Upper Division in August 1984.

From August 1984 to August 1985, he served as a Clinical Biochemist in the Medical Laboratory of the Rivers State University of Science and Technology, Port Harcourt for his National Youth Service. Okezie Ikpeazu returned to the University of Maiduguri for an M.Sc. Degree in Biochemical Toxicology and graduated in 1990. In 1994, at the age of 30, he obtained a Doctorate Degree, Ph.D. in Biochemical Pharmacology from the University of Calabar.

Before joining politics, Okezie Ikpeazu had been a lecturer in several Nigerian educational institutions.

== Political career ==
On 31 December 2015, a Court of Appeal sitting in Owerri sacked Ikpeazu as Governor and declared Alex Otti as the winner of the 2015 gubernatorial election held on 11 and 25 April 2015. On 27 June 2016, Justice Okon Abang of the Federal High Court, Abuja ordered Ikpeazu to vacate his office as governor upon allegations of false information and forgery of documents prior to the 2015 gubernatorial election. The suit was however dismissed by a Federal High Court in Owerri. Okezie Ikpeazu ran for a second term under his party, PDP and emerged the winner of the election, hereby welcoming his second term as Governor of Abia State.

Ikpeazu was appointed as Nigeria's ambassador to Spain and resumed office on 14 September 2026.

== Contracts corruption allegations ==
In November 2020, the Peoples Gazette released a report reviewing Abia State financial records from 2016 and 2017. The records showed a suspicious amount of government funds having been wired to associates of Ikpeazu and their companies, including an estimated ₦3.4 billion to three companies owned by Enyinnaya Nwafor and ₦412 million in contracts to a company owned by Innocent Adiele.

== Personal life ==
Ikpeazu is a member of the Seventh-day Adventist Church and has four children with his wife.

== See also ==
- List of governors of Abia State
