= 2007 Abia State gubernatorial election =

State election in Nigeria

- 14 April 2007
Nominee	Theodore Orji	Onyema Ugochukwu
Party	PPA	PDP
Governor before election
Orji Uzor Kalu
PPA
Elected Governor
Theodore Orji
PPA

The Abia State gubernatorial election of 2007 was the third gubernatorial election of Abia State. The Progressive Peoples Alliance nominee Theodore Orji was declared winner after defeating Onyema Ugochukwu of the People's Democratic Party.
