= Executive Council of Abia State =

Executive arm of a state government in Nigeria

The Executive Council of Abia State (informally and more commonly, the Cabinet of Abia State) is the highest formal governmental body that plays important roles in the Government of Abia State headed by the Governor of Abia State in Nigeria. It consists of the deputy governor, Secretary to the State Government, chief of staff, commissioners who preside over ministerial departments, and the governor's special aides. Appointment into these positions except the position of deputy governor is exercised by the governor on approval and confirmation by the Abia State House of Assembly.

== Functions ==
Officially, the executive council exists to advice and direct the governor in order to improve the governor's performance on the welfare of the state. Their appointment as members of the executive council gives them the authority to execute power.

== Current cabinet ==
The current executive council is serving under the Okezie Ikpeazu administration, who took office as the 4th governor of Abia State on 29 May 2015. On the 17th of October 2019, the executive governor of Abia State Okezie Ikpeazu swore in a new Cabinet except the office of his chief of staff, Commissioner for Information and the Commissioner for Justice and attorney-general, Barr Uche Ihediwa.

Office	Incumbent
Governor	Okezie Ikpeazu
Deputy Governor	Ude Oko Chukwu
Secretary to the State Government	Barr. Chris Ezem
Head of Service	Sir Onyii Wamah
Chief of Staff	Okey Ahiwe: 11 April 2022-31 January 2023
Deputy Chief of Staff (Governor's Office)	Vancant currently
Deputy Chief of Staff (Deputy Governor's Office)	Sir Don Ubani
Commissioner for Finance	Dr. Aham Uko
Commissioner for Budget and Planning	Vacant
Commissioner for Corporatives & Rural Development	Mazi Donatus Okorie
Commissioner for Basic Education	Chief Emma Ukwu
Commissioner for Post- Basic Education	Barr Chijioke Mark
Attorney general/Commissioner for Justice	Barr. Uche Ihediwa
Commissioner for Health	Dr Joe Osuji
Commissioner for Housing	Chief Chinagorom Nwankpa
Commissioner for Inter-government affairs	Obinna Okey
Commissioner for Parastatals	Monday Ejiegbu
Commissioner for Industry	Mrs Uwaoma Olewengwa
Commissioner for Information	Barr Eze Chikamnayo
Commissioner for Joint projects	Barr Chinenye Emelogu
Commissioner for Documentation and Strategic Communication	Ugochukwu N Emezue
Commissioner for special duties/Vulnerable group	Chief Chisom Nwachukwu
Commissioner for Local Government and Chieftaincy	Prince Christopher Enweremadu
Commissioner for Petroleum	Chief Eze Nwanganga
Commissioner for Public Utilities	Chief Kingsley Imaga
Commissioner for SMEs Development	Mrs Adaku Uwaoma Onusirika Osieza
Commissioner for Science and Technology	Okezie Erondu
Commissioner for Youth Development	Barr Charles Esonu
Commissioner for Sports	Pascal Karibe Ojigwe
Commissioner for Culture and Tourism	Barr Tony Nwanmuo
Commissioner for Trade and Investment	John Okiyi Kalu
Commissioner for Agriculture	Prof Ikechi Mgbeoji
Commissioner for Transport	Chief Godswill Uche Nwanoruo
Commissioner for Women Affairs	Deaconess Rose Urenta
Commissioner for Works	Bob Chiedozie Ogu
Commissioner for Homeland Security	Sopuruchi Bekee

== See also ==
- Abia State Government
