= F104 highway (Nigeria) =

Highway in Nigeria

F104

Location
- Country: Nigeria

Highway system
- Transport in Nigeria

F104 is an east–west highway in Nigeria that starts from Aba, Abia State. The road then runs through Azumini, Etinam, and Ndiya before terminating at Ikot Ubo on the F103 road.
