= Governor of Abia State =

Head of government of Abia State in Nigeria

- Seal of the governor

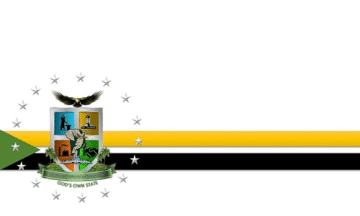
- Flag of Abia State
- Incumbent; Alex Otti since 29 May 2023
- Executive Branch of the Abia State Government
- Style: Governor (informal); His Excellency (courtesy)
- Type: Head of state; Head of government
- Member of: Abia State Executive Branch; Abia State Cabinet
- Residence: Abia State Government House
- Seat: Umuahia
- Appointer: Direct popular election or via succession from deputy governorship
- Term length: Four years renewable once
- Constituting instrument: Constitution of Nigeria
- Inaugural holder: Frank Ajobena
- Formation: 27 August 1991 (35 years ago)
- Deputy: Deputy Governor of Abia State
- Website: abiastate.gov.ng

The governor of Abia State is the head of government of Abia State in Nigeria. The governor is the head of the executive branch of the Abia State Government. The governor has a duty to enforce state laws and the power to either approve or veto bills passed by the Abia State House of Assembly, to convene the legislature and grant pardons.

When Abia State was created from Imo State in 1991, Group Captain Frank Ajobena was appointed its first governor. Three governors Orji Uzor Kalu (1999–2007), Theodore Orji (2007–2015) and Okezie Ikpeazu (2015–2023) served for two consecutive terms of 4 years.

Since the creation of the state in 1991, 10 people have served as governor, 5 military governors and 5 civilian governors. Ajobena served the shortest term in office of 4 months.

The current governor is Alex Otti, he was sworn in on 29 May 2023.

== Qualification ==
The Constitution of Nigeria requires that an aspiring candidate for the office of Abia State governor must:

- be a citizen of Nigeria by birth,
- have attained the age of thirty-five years,
- be a member of a political party and sponsored by that party,
- be educated to at least school certificate level or its equivalent.

== See also ==
- List of governors of Abia
