= Amadi Ikwechegh =

Nigerian naval officer (1951–2009)

Military Governor of Imo State
- In office 29 August 1986 – 2 September 1989
- Preceded by: Allison Amakoduna Madueke
- Succeeded by: Anthony Oguguo

Personal details
- Born: 25 February 1951 Bende, Abia State, Nigeria
- Died: 10 November 2009 (aged 58)

Commodore Amadi Guy Ikwechegh // (25 February 1951 – 10 November 2009) was a Nigerian naval officer who was appointed military governor of Imo State from 1986 to 1989 during the military regime of General Ibrahim Babangida.

== Early life and education ==
Ikwechegh was born on 25 February 1951 in Amakpo, Igbere in Bende, Abia State. He attended Township School in Aba and the Nigerian Military School, Zaria (1963 to 1966), and attended the Nigerian Defence Academy, Kaduna in 1971. He was commissioned as a sub-lieutenant in 1974. He then studied at Britannia Royal Naval College at Dartmouth, England, the Royal Hydrographic School, Australia and the Naval School of Oceanography, USA. He attended the Armed Forces Command and Staff College, Jaji, and also earned a masters in Strategic Studies from the University of Ibadan.

== Naval career ==
As a naval officer, Ikwechegh served in various capacities including Military Port Commandant of Lagos Port, Hydrographer of the Navy, Director of Naval Intelligence and commander of the Navy's operational Bases in Okemini, Anansa and Olokun. He also commanded NNS Lana, the naval survey ship and was Commander of NNS Iriomi as Naval Task Force Commander, ECOMOG Forces, Liberia. He was a member of the Nigerian Hydrographic Society and the Nigerian Institute of Surveyors.

He served as ADC to Military Governor of Niger State, Commodore Ebitu Ukiwe. From 1987 to 1990, he was Military Governor of Imo State and a member of the Provisional Ruling Council.

== Later life and death ==
He was retired in June 1999, along with all other military officers who had held political offices. He then went into marine related business in Port Harcourt.

Ikwechegh died on 10 November 2009 after a protracted illness following a stroke he suffered in 2007. Chief Theodore Orji, who became governor of Abia State from May 2007, was a senior assistant secretary when Ikwechegh was governor of the old Imo State. After Ikwechegh's death, Orji described him as an intelligent and no-nonsense administrator.
