= F108 highway (Nigeria) =

Highway in Nigeria

F108 is an east–west highway in Nigeria, starting from Arochukwu, Abia State, and going through Ikot Okpora and Orira before terminating on Trunk Road A4.
