= Abia State Ministry of Education =

Ministry overview
- Jurisdiction: Government of Abia State
- Headquarters: State Government House, Umuahia, Abia State, Nigeria
- Ministry executive: Monica Philips, Commissioner

The Abia State Ministry of Education is a governing body of the Abia State Government responsible for the formulation and implementation of policies relating to education in Abia State. On 31 October 2012, it was reported in the media that over one hundred illegal schools used for examination malpractices were shut down by the Abia State Government through the Ministry of Education.

== See also ==
- Abia State Government
