= Ike Nwachukwu =

Nigerian politician and general (born 1940)

Major General Ike Nwachukwu

Senator for Abia North
- In office 3 June 1999 – 3 June 2003
- Succeeded by: Uche Chukwumerije

Foreign Minister of Nigeria
- In office September 1990 – January 1993
- President: Ibrahim Babangida
- Preceded by: Rilwan Lukman
- Succeeded by: Matthew Mbu
- In office December 1987 – December 1989
- President: Ibrahim Babangida
- Preceded by: Bolaji Akinyemi
- Succeeded by: Rilwan Lukman

General Officer Commanding 1st Division, Nigerian Army
- In office January 1990 – September 1990
- Preceded by: Maj Gen M.S. Sami
- Succeeded by: Maj Gen A.A. Abubakar

Minister of Labour
- In office December 1985 – December 1987
- President: Ibrahim Babangida

Military Governor of Imo State
- In office January 1984 – August 1985
- Preceded by: Sam Mbakwe
- Succeeded by: Allison Madueke

Personal details
- Born: 1 September 1940 (age 85) Port Harcourt, Southern Region, British Nigeria (now in Rivers State, Nigeria)

Military service
- Allegiance: Nigeria
- Branch/service: Nigerian Army
- Rank: Major general

Ike Omar Sanda Nwachukwu mni (born 1 September 1940) is a retired Nigerian Army major general and politician who served twice as Foreign Minister of Nigeria during the military regime of General Ibrahim Babangida, and as a Senator for Abia North from 1999 to 2003.

== Education and training ==
Born on 1 September 1940 in Port Harcourt to an Igbo father and a Fulani mother of Katsina, Nwachukwu had his early education at the Ladi-Lak Institute, Yaba, Lagos, and Lagos City College, also in Yaba, Lagos. He obtained his initial military training at the Nigerian Military Training College, Kaduna, course 6, then proceeded to the Royal Canadian School of Infantry, and then furthered his training at the School of Infantry, Warminster, United Kingdom. He also studied at the Institute of Humanitarian Law, San Remo, Italy, the United Nations Peace Academy, and the National Institute for Policy and Strategic Studies (NIPSS), Kuru, Plateau State. Ike Nwachukwu rose to the rank of major general prior to his retirement with the Nigerian Army.

== Career ==
Nwachukwu held the position of Military Governor of Imo State, where he moved Imo State University (now Abia State University) in Uturu to its permanent site. From 1986 to 1987 he was Minister for Employment, Labour and Productivity, where he founded the National Directorate of Employment (NDE) to alleviate the problems of unemployment, especially graduate unemployment.

Nwachukwu was Minister of Foreign Affairs from December 1987 to December 1989, when he was replaced by Rilwanu Lukman, returning to a field military command position. In September 1990 he was re-appointed Minister of Foreign Affairs, being replaced in January 1993 by Matthew Mbu during the transition to civilian rule. He was active and effective as Foreign Minister, taking a mercantilist approach to diplomacy.

=== Senate ===
As an Abia State senator, Nwachukwu served as Chairman of two senate committees, the Senate Committee on Power and Steel and the Senate Committee on Governmental Affairs.

== 2003 Presidential elections ==
Nwachukwu participated in the 2003 Nigerian presidential election, for the National Democratic Party; he won 0.34% of the vote.

Political offices
Preceded by Bolaji Akinyemi	Foreign Minister of Nigeria; 1987 –1989	Succeeded by Rilwan Lukman
Preceded by Rilwan Lukman	Foreign Minister of Nigeria; 1990 –1993	Succeeded by Matthew Mbu
