= Onwuka Kalu =

Nigerian businessman (1954–2015)

- Born: 24 May 1954; Abiriba, Abia State, Nigeria
- Died: 23 February 2015 (aged 60); Edgware, London, England
- Occupation: Businessman
- Known for: founding the Fidelity Bank Nigeria

Onwuka Kalu (24 May 1954 – 23 February 2015) was a Nigerian businessman who founded Onwuka Hi-Tek a manufacturing concern in Aba, which was later quoted on the Nigerian Stock Exchange but later fell into decline after Kalu fell out with the Nigerian government. He was a promoter of made in Nigeria and made in Aba products and was also a co-founder of Fidelity Union Merchant Bank.

== Life ==
Kalu was born in Abiriba, Abia State to parents of humble means. He began his career working for a West Africa concern Chika Group in Togo and Benin Republic from where he developed his trading skills. The firm was a trading concern with focus on importation of goods such as second hand clothes but Kalu started as houseboy before becoming secretary and later managing an import division. He also formed his own firm, Onwuka Interbiz with savings from his job to trade in Japanese textiles. In 1977, he returned to Nigeria to set up a firm, Nails and General Steel Manufacturing Industry Ltd to produce nails. He added the production of screws, bolts and barbed wire to the firm's brand list. When the machines presses used in the manufacture of nails were failing, he turned to the production of auto spare parts similar to products that were already in the market. To promote the firm's product and also encourage local manufacturing, he organized a Made in Nigeria trade fair in Aba in 1982 that was opened by then President Shehu Shagari. He then developed advocacy for patronage of locally manufactured products and later published a book in 1986 entitled The Challenge of Industrialisation in Nigeria. The firm developed business relationships with multinational firms such as Lever Brothers, UAC and Peugeot and some indigenous firms. In 1991, shares of Onwuka Hi-Tek were publicly listed on the stock exchange.

=== Political career ===
Kalu was a member of the 1988 Constituent Assembly that deliberated on the structure of the Third Republic government. He then became a leading member of the Liberal Convention but the association was banned by President Babangida in 1990. Kalu subsequently left politics. Kalu soon founded a children's foundation to bring the plight of many children who are affected by preventable issues and diseases. The foundation organized the Children of Africa charity concert that had entertainers like Dionne Warwick, Kool and the Gang, the Temptations and Miriam Makeba perform. The concert was planned to be a three-day event and guests to include Augustus Aikhomu and General Ibrahim Babangida. However, the concert failed to raise enough money impacted by a restriction of movement caused by the schedule of a national census, highly priced tickets also deterred many from showing up and stars had to play in an arena that was half filled.

After the annulment of the June 12 Nigerian Presidential election, through his work with National Democratic Coalition (NADECO), Kalu came back into public discourse as a supporter for a return to democratic government during the regime of Sani Abacha. He was arrested along with Olu Falae and was imprisoned for a year before he fled into exile, though he lost an eye. In exile, he earned a law degree.

Kalu returned to Nigeria during the Fourth Republic, in 2003, he was an Abia State governorship candidate for All Progressives Grand Alliance (APGA).

== Death ==
Kalu died of acute myeloid leukaemia on 23 February 2015 in a hospital in Edgware, London.
