= Bolaji Akinyemi =

Nigerian professor of political science

Bolaji Akinyemi CFR

External Affairs Minister of Nigeria
- In office 1985–1987
- President: Ibrahim Babangida
- Preceded by: Ibrahim Gambari
- Succeeded by: Ike Nwachukwu

Personal details
- Born: 4 January 1942 (age 84) Ilesa, Osun State
- Spouse: Rowena Akinyemi
- Children: Atinuke Akinyemi, Tosin Akinyemi, Tolu Akinyemi, Benjamin Akinyemi
- Profession: Professor of political science
- Website: www.profbolajiakinyemi.com

Akinwande Bolaji Akinyemi (born 4 January 1942) is a Nigerian professor of political science who was Nigeria External Affairs Minister from 1985 to late 1987. He is the chairman of the National Think Tank.

== Early life and education ==
Akinyemi was born in Ilesa, in what is now Osun State. He attended Igbobi College in Yaba from 1955 until 1959, Christ's School Ado Ekiti from 1960 to 1961, Temple University, Philadelphia, Pennsylvania, United States, from 1962 to 1964, Fletcher School of Law and Diplomacy, Tufts University, Medford, Massachusetts, US, 1964 to 1966, and Trinity College, Oxford, England, from 1966 until 1969.

He was a visiting professor at the Graduate Institute of International Studies in Geneva and at the Diplomacy Training Programme, University of Nairobi, Kenya, both in 1977. He was Regents Lecturer at the University of California, Los Angeles, US, in 1979, professor of political science at the University of Lagos, from 1983 until 1985, and visiting fellow, St John's College, Cambridge, England in 1984.

Akinyemi was director-general of the Nigerian Institute of International Affairs (NIIA) from 1975 until 1983. The NIIA is an organisation focusing on Nigerian foreign policy; while he was director-general, it was involved in promoting Nigerian-Angolan relations, among other things. He has written and edited so many books and journals.

== Term as external affairs minister ==
Akinyemi was appointed Minister of External Affairs by military leader Ibrahim Babangida in 1985. While in this position, he originated the Technical Aid Corps (TAC), a program which sent Nigerian professionals overseas to engage in volunteer work. It was designed to "promote the country's image and status as a major contributor to Third World and particularly African development". He also came up with the concept of the "Concert of Medium Powers".

In his position as Minister of External Affairs, Akinyemi headed numerous Nigerian delegations. Among the delegations he headed were his country's delegations to the United Nations General Assembly Session (1985), the Organisation of African Unity, Council of Ministers Session (1986), the Non–Aligned Foreign Ministers Conference (1986), the United Nations General Assembly Annual Session (1986), the United Nations General Assembly Special Session on the Critical Economic Situation in Africa (1986), the Budget Session of the Council of Ministers of the Organisation of African Unity (1987), the Ordinary Session of the Council of Ministers of the Organisation of African Unity (1987), the United Nations General Assembly Session (1987), and to the Extra–Ordinary Session of the Council of Ministers of the Organisation of African Unity devoted to African debt (1987).

In 1987, Akinyemi stated his support for Nigeria developing nuclear weapons. He referred to the proposal as the "black bomb," and said that "Nigeria has a sacred responsibility to challenge the racial monopoly of nuclear weapons."

== Later life ==
During the short-lived Third Republic of 1993, he called on the military to overthrow Ernest Shonekan's administration; Sani Abacha, Defense Minister at the time, later did so, and assumed the position of head of state. Akinyemi was later among those who opposed Abacha's regime.

In August 2007, President Umaru Yar'Adua appointed him to the newly created Electoral Reform Panel. In January 2025, President Bola Tinubu appointed Akinyemi as the board chairman of the Nigerian Institute of International Affairs.

== Personal life ==
He married Rowena Jane Viney in 1970. They have one son and three daughters.

Political offices
Preceded by Ibrahim Gambari	Foreign Minister of Nigeria; 1985–1987	Succeeded by Ike Nwachukwu
