= Johnson Onuoha =

Anglican bishop in Nigeria

Johnson Onuoha is an Anglican bishop in Nigeria: he is the current Bishop of Arochukwu/Ohafia, one of nine within the Anglican Province of Aba, itself one of 14 provinces within the Church of Nigeria.
