= Ndubuisi Kanu =

Nigerian politician (1943–2021)

Rear Admiral Ndubuisi Kanu
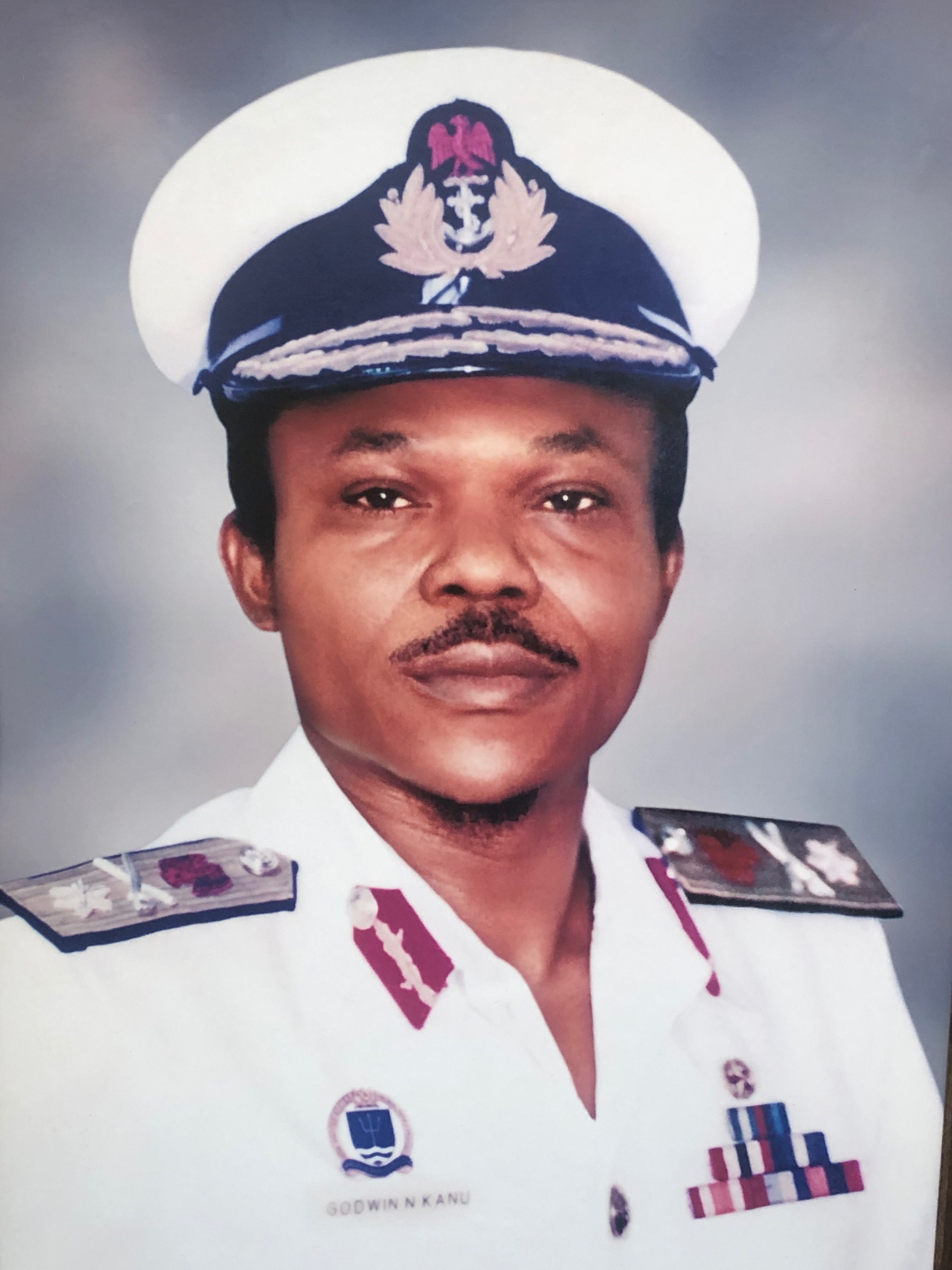

Military Governor of Imo State
- In office 15 March 1976 – 1977
- Preceded by: Anthony Ochefu (East Central State)
- Succeeded by: Adekunle Lawal

Military Governor of Lagos State
- In office 1977 – July 1978
- Preceded by: Adekunle Lawal
- Succeeded by: Ebitu Ukiwe

Personal details
- Born: 3 November 1943
- Died: 13 January 2021 (aged 77)

Military service
- Allegiance: Nigeria
- Branch/service: Nigerian Navy
- Rank: Rear Admiral

Ndubuisi Godwin Kanu (3 November 1943 – 13 January 2021) was a Nigerian military officer and state governor. Early in his career, he fought for the Biafran side in the Nigerian Civil War and in July 1975 he was appointed to Murtala Muhammed's Supreme Military Council. After military president Olusegun Obasanjo came to power Kanu was appointed military governor of Imo State and then Lagos State. Returning to the military, he served with the United Nations Interim Force in Lebanon. In retirement, he was a pro-democracy campaigner and called for decentralisation of power and increased federalism.

== Early life and naval career ==
Ndubuisi Kanu was born in Ovim village in Isuikwuato, Abia State on 3 November 1943. He was of Igbo origin and attended the Methodist Primary School in Enugu. Joining the navy in 1962, he went to India for cadet training. His naval career included positions in Personnel, Logistics and Training. Kanu fought in the Nigerian Civil War for the Biafran forces.

In July 1975, as a lieutenant commander, he was appointed a member of Murtala Muhammed's ruling Cabinet, the Supreme Military Council. Under military president Olusegun Obasanjo (who came into office in February 1976) Kanu was appointed military governor of Imo State in March 1976. He brought in town planners to prepare a plan for the development of the state capital, Owerri, and constructed new roads in the state. Kanu increased the number of local government areas in the state to 21 and also established the Imo Broadcasting Service (which is now the Imo Broadcasting Corporation).

Kanu transferred to Lagos State as military governor in 1977, holding that position until July 1978. He later became Rear Admiral and served with the United Nations Interim Force in Lebanon.

== Post-retirement ==
After Kanu retired he joined the pro-democracy movement, unlike many of his former military colleagues, and played a leading role in the agitation for the actualization of the annulled 12 June 1993 presidential election. He founded and was Chairman of RANGK LTD, a maritime consultancy, was Chairman of the Ohaneze Transition Caretaker Committee (OTC) and was Director of Fidelity Bank PLC. Kanu became a top National Democratic Coalition (NADECO) chieftain and became chairman of the coalition in 2013. In May 2008, Kanu called for a return to true federalism in Nigeria.

In an interview in November 2008, Kanu attacked what he called unitarism, the excessive concentration of powers by central government and called for fundamental dialogue between the different ethnic nationalities of Nigeria. He attributed the conflict in the Niger Delta to the lack of regional power. In another interview, he pinpointed the second stage of the General Ibrahim Babangida regime as a turning point towards increased centralisation. Kanu was among leaders who spoke in January 2010 at a Lagos rally of the Save Nigeria Group calling for Vice-president Goodluck Jonathan be made acting president during President Umaru Yar'Adua's illness.

Kanu was married three times and had ten children. He was married to Chief Mrs. Gladys Kanu (née Uzodike) from 1993 until his death. Kanu died on 13 January 2021 of complications from the COVID-19 virus.

== Awards and honours ==
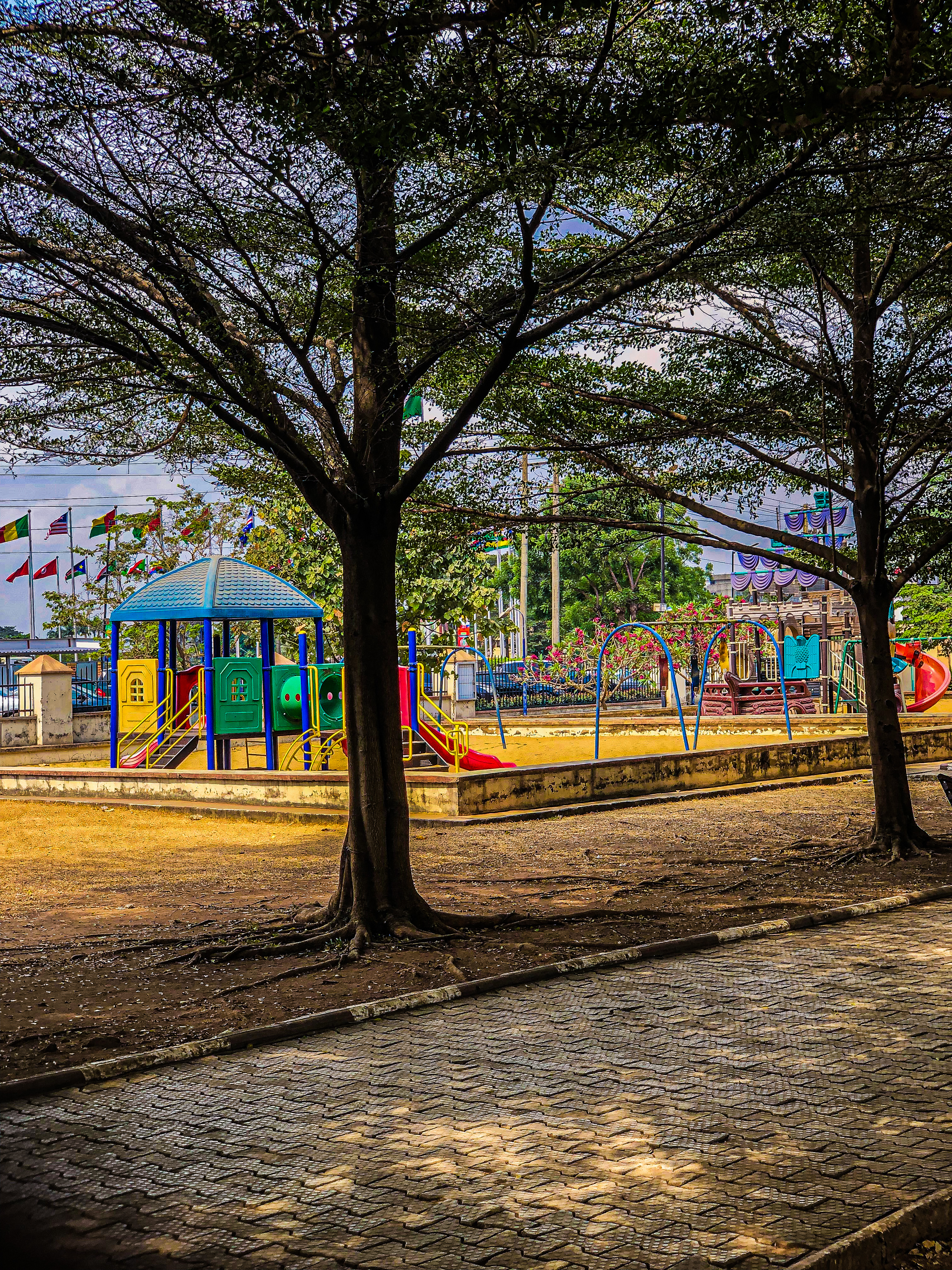
Kanu Ndubuisi Park, Ikeja

Kanu was awarded honorary Doctorate Degrees from the Imo State University and the Federal University of Technology, Owerri. The Lagos State government named a park "Ndubuisi Kanu Park" in his honour.
