= F107 highway (Nigeria) =

Highway in Nigeria

F107

Location
- Country: Nigeria

Highway system
- Transport in Nigeria

F107 is an east–west highway in Nigeria that starts from Umuahia, the capital city of Abia State, known for its production of yam, cassava, and palm oil. The road proceeds through Bende and terminates at Ohafia on F234.
