= Sam Mbakwe Airport =

Sam Mbakwe International Cargo Airport (SMICA) Imo Airport
- IATA: QOW; ICAO: DNIM

Summary
- Airport type: Public
- Owner/Operator: Federal Airports Authority of Nigeria (FAAN)
- Serves: Owerri, Nigeria, Aba, Nigeria, Umuahia, Nigeria
- Time zone: WAT (UTC+01:00)
- Elevation AMSL: 374 ft (114 m)
- Coordinates: 5°25′35″N 7°12′20″E

Map
- Location of the airport in Nigeria

Runways
Direction	Length		Surface
Direction	m	ft	Surface
17/35	2,700	8,858	Asphalt

Statistics (2015)
- Passengers: 313,343
- Passenger change 14–15: ▼7.6%
- WAD GCM Google Maps

Sam Mbakwe International Cargo Airport (IATA: QOW, ICAO: DNIM), also known as Imo State Airport, serves Owerri, the capital city of Imo State in southeastern Nigeria. It is located in Ngor Okpala Local Government Area, Imo State.

The building of the airport commenced with the administration of the first civilian governor of the old Imo State (now, Imo, Abia and Southern Ebonyi states), Dee Sam Mbakwe, in 1983, from generous contributions of the indigenes and people of the state and throughout the Igbo land. While this is the first state-owned airport, it is the first community-driven airport project ever known, at least, in the West of Africa.

The project also enjoyed immense support from successive Federal Military Governments especially under Navy Captain James N.J. Aneke, who saw to its completion, commissioning and operational commencement on 15 July 1994, under the late General Sani Abacha.

Other cities served by the airport are the commercial city of Onitsha, the automobile and manufacturing city of Nnewi in Anambra State, the industrial hub of Aba, Umuahia and Arochukwu in Abia State. Others are Okigwe, Oguta, and Orlu business districts in Imo State. The airport also serves some parts of Akwa Ibom and Cross River States in the South South (southernmost part) of Nigeria.

The airport is named after Sam Mbakwe, the first civilian governor of Imo State who started the project. As mentioned, it is the first state-government-built airport built from the support and contributions of indigenes of the state and the entire Igbo land. Navy Captain James N.J. Aneke, who was the military administrator of Imo State from 9 December 1993 to 22 August 1996, completed and commissioned the airport on 15 July 1994. It was later handed over to FAAN (Federal Airport Authority of Nigeria) to be managed by the federal government.

== Facilities ==
The airport underwent upgrading in 2013-14 that covered its infrastructure and the communication equipment covering the airspace past Port Harcourt Airport as part of the Total Radar Coverage of Nigeria (TRACON) project.

The airport has night landing capabilities, but for most flights in non-international designated airports, the Federal Airports Authority of Nigeria restricts night operations except for passenger flights during pilgrimage (Hajj).

== Airlines and destinations ==
Airlines	Destinations
Air Peace	Abuja, Lagos
Arik Air	Lagos
Azman Air	Abuja
Enugu Air	Lagos
United Nigeria Airlines	Abuja, Lagos
Green Africa Airways	Lagos

== Statistics ==
These data show the number of passengers' movements into the airport, according to the Federal Airports Authority of Nigeria's Aviation Sector Summary Reports.

Year	2005	2006	2007	2008	2009	2010	2011	2012	2013	2014	2015
Passengers	66,093	345,078	457,544	200,097	276,926	476,063	384,016	265,082	267,532	338,943	313,343
Growth (%)	▲11.05%	▲422.11%	▲32.59%	▼56.27%	▲38.40%	▲71.91%	▼19.34%	▼30.97%	▲0.92%	▲26.69%	▼7.55%
Source: Federal Airports Authority of Nigeria (FAAN). Aviation Sector Reports (2010-2013, 2014, Q3-Q4 of 2015, and Q1-Q2 of 2016)

== See also ==
- Transport in Nigeria
- List of airports in Nigeria
- List of the busiest airports in Africa
