= 2011 Abia State gubernatorial election =

State election in Nigeria

- 26 April 2011
Nominee	Theodore Orji	Reagan Ufomba
Party	PDP	APGA
Popular vote	641,158	49,421
Governor before election
Theodore Orji
PDP
Elected Governor
Theodore Orji
PDP

The Abia State gubernatorial election of 2011 was the fourth gubernatorial election of Abia State. The election was held on 26 April 2011, with Theodore Orji of the People's Democratic Party declared winner for a second term in office after defeating the All Progressives Grand Alliance nominee Reagan Ufomba.

== Results ==
2015 gubernatorial election, Abia State
Party	Candidate	Votes	%	±%
PDP	Theodore Orji	641,158		
APGA	Reagan Ufomba	49,421		
Majority		591,737		
Turnout		690,579		
PDP hold		Swing		
