= Moses Fasanya =

Nigerian politician and army officer

Military Administrator of Abia State
- In office 22 August 1996 – August 1998
- Preceded by: Temi Ejoor
- Succeeded by: Anthony Obi

Military Administrator of Ondo State
- In office August 1998 – May 1999
- Preceded by: Anthony Onyearugbulem
- Succeeded by: Adebayo Adefarati

Military service
- Allegiance: Nigeria
- Branch/service: Nigerian Army
- Rank: Colonel

Moses Fasanya is a Nigerian retired colonel from Ibadan, Oyo State, who served as military administrator of Abia State from August 1996 to August 1998, during the military regime of General Sani Abacha. He was later appointed military administrator of Ondo State in August 1998 and handed over power to the civilian governor, Adebayo Adefarati, in May 1999.

He faced criticism in Ondo State for his handling of the election of the traditional Owo leader, which led to chaos, fatalities and destruction of property. In October 1998, hundreds of people were killed in clashes between local Ijaws in the Akpata region and Ilaje Yorubas seeking work on a newly found oilfield. Fasanya had difficulty agreeing with Ijaw leaders on ways to stabilize the situation. He deployed soldiers and police to the area to restore peace. In February 1999, Fasanya's aides mistreated and detained fifteen journalists covering a meeting of state administrators of the Odu'a Investment Company in Akure.

In March 2009, an oil tanker caught fire in Obadore, near Lagos State University. Fasanya lost printing materials and other goods worth over ₦3 million, which were stored in ten shops that were destroyed in the blaze.
