= Chigozirim Onyegbule =

Anglican bishop in Nigeria

Chigozirim Onyegbule is an Anglican bishop in Nigeria: he is the current Bishop of Ikwanuo, one of nine within the Anglican Province of Aba, itself one of 14 provinces within the Church of Nigeria.
