= Alex Otti =

Nigerian banker and politician (born 1965)

His Excellency Alex Otti OFR
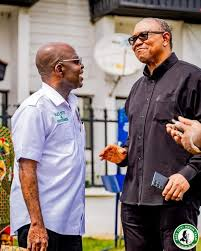
- Alex Otti with Peter Obi

Governor of Abia State
- Incumbent
- Assumed office 29 May 2023
- Deputy: Ikechukwu Emetu
- Preceded by: Okezie Ikpeazu

Personal details
- Born: 18 February 1965 (age 61) Abia State, Nigeria
- Party: Labour Party
- Spouse: Priscilla Otti
- Education: University of Lagos
- Occupation: Politician, Banker, Economist. Former MD and CEO, Diamond Bank, Present Governor of Abia state.
- Website: www.alexotti.com

Alexander Chioma Otti, Sr. OFR (born 18 February 1965) is a Nigerian economist, banker, investor, philanthropist, and politician, serving as the current Governor of Abia State in Nigeria. He is from Umuru Umuehim in Isialangwa South LGA. Otti is the former Group Managing Director of Diamond Bank Plc, a retail financial institution in Nigeria. Otti was a gubernatorial candidate of Abia State on the platform of All Progressives Grand Alliance (APGA). On 31 December 2015, The Court of Appeal which sat in Owerri removed Okezie Ikpeazu of the Peoples Democratic Party as governor of Abia State and declared Otti the winner of the April 11 and April 25 Governorship elections in the state. On February 3, 2016, the Supreme Court of Nigeria reversed the verdict of the Court of Appeal and affirmed the election of Ikpeazu as Governor. Otti is a member of the editorial board of Thisday, and writes a fortnightly column, every other Monday, titled "Outside The Box".

Otti continued his political aspiration and joined the Labour Party in May 2022 after leaving the All Progressive Congress. Upon joining the labour party, he contested for the post of the party flag bearer and was declared unopposed for the governorship election in 2022.

At the end of the 2023 general elections, he defeated his conterpart in the PDP and emerged as the governor of Abia State under the keenly contested governorship election as a Labour Party member.

He defeated his closest rival Okey Ahiwe who contested under the Peoples Democratic Party after the results were declared by Nnenna Oti, the returning officer for the Independent National Electoral Commission.

== Early life and education ==
Otti was born to the family of the late Pastor and Mrs. Lazarus Weze Otti at Umuru, Umuehim village in Ehi Na Uguru Ancient Kingdom, Isiala Ngwa South LGA of Abia State. He had his secondary school education at Ngwa High School, Aba and Secondary Technical School, Okpuala Ngwa in Abia State, where he finished as the best student in his set during the school certificate examinations. He thereafter proceeded to the University of Port Harcourt for his university education, where he graduated with a First Class honors degree in economics in 1988.

Otti earned an MBA degree from the University of Lagos in 1994. He has attended various international courses including the Executive Development Programmes of the Columbia Business and Stanford Business School and Wharton Business School (University of Pennsylvania). He also did an executive programme at INSEAD, Fontainebleau, France.

In 2009 he was conferred with an honorary doctorate degree by Babcock University and in 2012, an honorary Doctor of Science (D.Sc.) Degree by the University of Port Harcourt. In 2013, he received another honorary doctorate degree from the University of Nigeria, Nsukka.

== Career ==
Otti began his banking career in 1989 with the Nigerian International Bank, a subsidiary of Citibank New York, where he worked in the operations department. Thereafter he moved to the then Nigerian Intercontinental Merchant Bank Ltd. While at Intercontinental Bank, he worked both in the treasury and financial services unit as well as the corporate banking division. In 1992, he joined Societe Bancaire Nigeria Limited (Merchant Bankers), a subsidiary of Banque SBA Paris where he rose to the position of a senior manager. He moved on to the United Bank for Africa (UBA) as the principal manager overseeing the bank’s corporate banking sector for the entire South Division with the responsibility of growing the oil and gas business for the bank. In May 2001, he joined First Bank of Nigeria, PLC as assistant general manager in with the sole responsibility of growing the Energy Sector for the bank. In April 2004, he was promoted to the position of deputy general manager, and a year later was appointed executive director, commercial banking. This was followed by a re-designation as the executive director south directorate, where he was responsible for over 140 branches in both the South-South and South Eastern geopolitical zones of the country. In March 2011, he moved from First Bank Nigeria PLC to Diamond Bank as group managing director/ chief executive officer and has led the bank through a major transformation. Upon expiration of his first tenure, Diamond Bank renewed his tenure in March 2014 to an additional three years.

On October 24, 2014, Otti took voluntary retirement and Uzoma Dozie became the new GMD and Bank CEO.

== Personal life ==
Otti is a member of the Seventh-day Adventist Church. He is married to Priscilla Otti and they have three children.

== See also ==
- List of governors of Abia State
- List of Igbo People
