= 1991 Abia State gubernatorial election =

1991 gubernatorial election in Abia State, Nigeria

Abia gubernatorial election
- December 14, 1991
Nominee	Ogbonnaya Onu
Party	NRC
Elected Governor
Ogbonnaya Onu
NRC

The 1991 Abia State gubernatorial election occurred on December 14, 1991. NRC candidate Ogbonnaya Onu won the election.

== Conduct ==
The gubernatorial election was conducted using an open ballot system. Primaries for the two parties to select their flag bearers were conducted on October 19, 1991.

The election occurred on December 14, 1991. NRC candidate Ogbonnaya Onu won the election.
