= Frank Ajobena =

Nigerian politician

Frank O. Ajobena

First Military Administrator of Abia State
- In office 28 August 1991 – January 1992
- Succeeded by: Ogbonnaya Onu

Personal details
- Born: April 1949 Jos, Plateau State
- Education: MSc Strategic Studies

Air Vice Marshal (rtd) Frank Onaweneryene Ajobena, psc+, fwc, MSc, CON was the military administrator of Abia State from 28 August 1991 until January 1992.

== Post service life ==
When Felix Mujakperuo was chosen as Orodje of Okpe Kingdom in 2004, Ajobena filed suit in favor of his own claim to the throne. Ajobena's suit was dismissed, and Mujakperuo was installed as Orhue I, Orodje of Okpe on July 29, 2006.
