= Ike Nwosu =

Nigerian politician

Brigadier General Chinyere Ike Nwosu

Military Administrator of Abia State
- In office 9 December 1993 – 14 September 1994
- Preceded by: Ogbonnaya Onu
- Succeeded by: Temi Ejoor

Military Administrator of Oyo State
- In office 14 September 1994 – 22 August 1996
- Preceded by: Adetoye Oyetola Sode
- Succeeded by: Ahmed Usman

Personal details
- Born: 21 November 1946 (age 79)

Military service
- Allegiance: Nigeria
- Branch/service: Nigerian Army
- Rank: Brigadier General

Chinyere Ike Nwosu (born 21 November 1946) was a Nigerian Military Administrator of Abia State (December 1993 – September 1994) and then of Oyo State (September 1994 – August 1996) during the military regime of General Sani Abacha.

As Abia State governor, he was described as a very controversial administrator given to whimsical actions. In 1993, his wife Chinyere Nwosu established the Abia Less Privileged Organisation (ALPO), to assist women in gaining accommodation and skills.

As governor of Oyo State, he upset the power balance of the traditional rulers by making the Alaafin of Oyo, Oba Lamidi Adeyemi, permanent chairman of the Oyo State Council of Obas. Before then, the position had rotated between the three Obas. In March 1995, he ordered motorists and taxi passengers from their vehicles at the Egbeda taxi and lorry motor park in Ibadan for violating the Oyo "Sanitation Day" exercise. His mobile court fined scores of travelers, and forced them to kneel in the hot sun. On April 25, Nwosu's aides attacked a bank manager in Ibadan after the banker's car almost collided with Nwosu's convoy, beating the man unconscious with rifle butts.

In response to a strike threat, in February 1995, Nwosu ordered the closure of Broadcasting Corporation of Oyo State, and sacked the entire work force of the corporation. The September 1996 issues of Nigerian news magazines, Tell and This Week claimed that Nwosu "spent 16.875 million naira ($214,000) on himself between March 1995 and March 1996".
