= Anglican Diocese of Arochukwu/Ohafia =

Anglican diocese in Nigeria

The Anglican Diocese of Arochukwu/Ohafia is one of nine within the Anglican Province of Aba, itself one of 14 ecclesiastical provinces within the Church of Nigeria. The current bishop is the Right Rev. Johnson Onuoha
