= Anglican Diocese of Ikwuano =

Anglican diocese in Nigeria

Coordinates: 5°26′N 7°34′E

The Anglican Diocese of Ikwuano is one of nine dioceses within the Anglican Province of Aba, itself one of 14 ecclesiastical provinces within the Church of Nigeria. The current bishop is the Right Rev. Chigozirim Onyegbule
