= Ogbonnaya Onu =

Nigerian politician (1951–2024)

Ogbonnaya Onu CON FNSE, FNSChE, FAEng
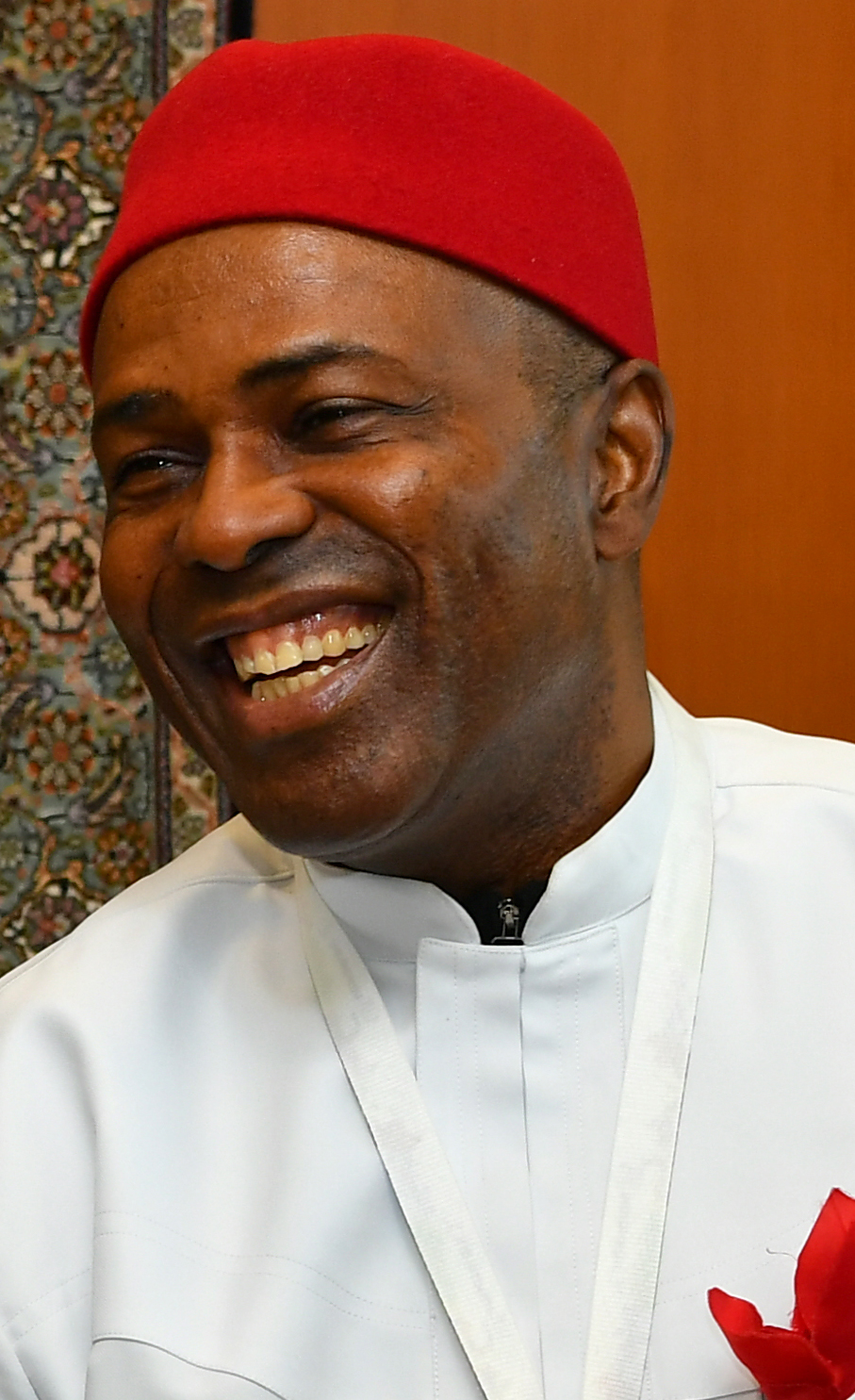
- Onu in 2018

Minister of Science, Technology and Innovation
- In office 14 June 2019 – 11 May 2022
- Appointed by: Muhammadu Buhari
- Succeeded by: Adeleke Mamora
- In office 11 November 2015 – 29 May 2019
- Appointed by: Muhammadu Buhari

Governor of Abia State
- In office January 1992 – November 1993
- Deputy: Chima Nwafor
- Preceded by: Frank Ajobena (military)
- Succeeded by: Chinyere Ike Nwosu (military)

Personal details
- Born: Ogbonnaya Onu; 1 December 1951 Ohaozara, Southern Region, Colony and Protectorate of Nigeria (now in Ebonyi State, Nigeria)
- Died: 11 April 2024 (aged 72) Abuja, Nigeria
- Party: All Progressives Congress
- Education: Doctor of Philosophy degree in Chemical Engineering
- Alma mater: University of Lagos; University of California, Berkeley
- Profession: Politician; engineer

Ogbonnaya Onu CON (1 December 1951 – 11 April 2024) was a Nigerian politician, author and engineer. He was the first civilian governor of Abia State and was the minister of science, technology and innovation of Nigeria from November 2015 until his resignation in 2022. He was the longest serving minister of the ministry.

== Biography ==
Ogbonnaya Onu was born on 1 December 1951, to the family of Eze David Aba Onu in Amata, Uburu, Ohaozara Local Government Area of the then East Central State, later Imo State, then Abia State and now Ebonyi State Nigeria. He started his education at Izzi High School in Abakaliki, now the Ebonyi State capital. Here, he obtained grade one with distinction in his West African School Certificate Examination. He also sat for the Higher School Certificate Examination at College of Immaculate Conception (C.I.C) Enugu, graduating as the overall best student. He proceeded to the University of Lagos and graduated with a first class degree in chemical engineering in 1976. He went for his doctoral studies at the University of California, Berkeley, and obtained a Doctor of Philosophy degree in chemical engineering in 1980. Onu died on 11 April 2024, at the age of 72.

== Career ==
=== Teaching career ===
After his graduation from the University of Lagos, Ogbonnaya Onu became a teacher at St. Augustine's Seminary, Ezzamgbo, Ebonyi State. After the completion of his doctoral studies at the University of California, Berkeley, Onu became a lecturer in the Department of Chemical Engineering at the University of Port Harcourt, and later became the pioneer head of the department. He also served as the acting dean of the Faculty of Engineering and was also elected as a member of the Governing Council of the university.

=== Political career ===
Ogbonnaya Onu started his political career as an aspirant for a senatorial seat in the old Imo State on the platform of the National Party of Nigeria (NPN). He contested for the position of Governor of Abia State in 1991 under the umbrella of the National Republican Convention and won. He was sworn in as the first executive governor of the state in January 1992. He was the first chairman, Conference of Nigerian elected governors. In 1999, he was the presidential flag bearer for the All People's Party but relinquished the position to Olu Falae after a merger of his party with the Alliance for Democracy which lost to Olusegun Obasanjo of the PDP. He became the national chairman of the All Nigeria People's Party in 2010. In 2013, he and his party (ANPP) successfully merged with the Action Congress of Nigeria (ACN), Congress for Progressive Change (CPC), Democratic People's Party (DPP) and some members of the All Progressives Grand Alliance (APGA) to form the All Progressives Congress (APC). In November 2015, he was appointed Minister of Science and Technology by President Muhammadu Buhari. On 21 August 2019, he was sworn in again as Minister of Science and Technology by President Muhammadu Buhari.

== Awards and achievements ==
Onu was a certified member of Council for the Regulation of Engineering in Nigeria, a fellow of the Nigerian Academy of Engineering, fellow of the Nigerian Society of Chemical Engineers.

In October 2022, a Nigerian national honour of Commander of the Order of the Niger (CON) was conferred on him by President Muhammadu Buhari.

== Controversies ==
Onu said Nigeria would begin local production of pencils by 2018 which he said would provide 400,000 jobs. As of 2019, he said production of pencils had not commenced. In 1999, prior to the presidential election and the alliance between the All People's Party and Alliance for Democracy, Onu was involved in a conflict involving both APP/AD picking Olu Falae as the joint presidential flag bearer.

== See also ==
- List of people from Ebonyi State
- Federal Ministry of Science, Technology and Innovation
- Cabinet of Nigeria
