= Anthony Oguguo =

Nigerian politician

Anthony Emeluwa Oguguo

Military Governor of Imo State
- In office August 1990 – January 1992
- Preceded by: Amadi Ikwechegh
- Succeeded by: Evan Enwerem

Military service
- Allegiance: Nigeria
- Branch/service: Nigerian Navy
- Rank: Commodore

Navy Commodore Anthony Emeluwa Oguguo // was military governor of Imo State in Nigeria from 1990 to 1992 during the military regime of General Ibrahim Babangida. During his administration, Imo State airport was commissioned and built and still operates today. He very famously said "I saw money and looked away, it is not everything; we can all do the same and teach it to our children."

His administration took a strong hold with Trade Unions. In 1991, he demanded a list of absentee workers who were striking for a minimum wage of N380. As governor, he commissioned the 100 bed Osina Community hospital in 1991. He was a member of the Provisional Ruling Council (PRC), and was involved in the decisions about the transition to democracy, leading to the short-lived Nigerian Third Republic.

He was a member of a coalition of Enugu State elders who spoke out against the government for alleged involvement in the killing of 14 Catholic worshippers at the Government Technical College in March 2002. They were protesting state action against a church leader. In August 2002, he was an aspirant to be a governorship candidate for Enugu State on All Nigeria Peoples Party (ANPP) platform. By January 2003, the ANPP had still not settled on their candidate. Anthony Oguguo and two others walked out of the primary convention over alleged discrepancies on delegates lists, and the remaining candidate Chief Fidel Ayogu was announced the winner but failed to win in the general elections.

In April 2009, he transferred his allegiance to the ruling People's Democratic Party (PDP). In October 2009, he was among PDP elders who criticized the actions of Enugu State governor Sullivan Chime in his feud with Joseph Onoh, son of the former Anambra State governor Christian Onoh.
