= Temi Ejoor =

Military administrator of Enugu State, Nigeria

Military Administrator of Enugu State
- In office 9 December 1993 – 14 September 1994
- Preceded by: Okwesilieze Nwodo
- Succeeded by: Mike Torey

Military Administrator of Abia State
- In office 14 September 1994 – 22 August 1996
- Preceded by: Chinyere Ike Nwosu
- Succeeded by: Moses Fasanya

Navy Captain (later Commander) Temi Ejoor was a Nigerian Military Administrator of Enugu State (December 1993 – September 1994) and then of Abia State (September 1994 – August 1996) during the military regime of General Sani Abacha.

Temi Ejoor was born in Ughelli in Delta State. He is an alumnus of Hussey College Warri.

The concept of Obuaku City was conceived during his rule, as a new city to provide homes for people working in the nearby big cities of Aba and Port Harcourt, but little progress was made.
