= Anthony Obi =

Nigerian politician (1952–2022)

Military Administrator of Osun State
- In office 22 August 1996 – August 1998
- Preceded by: Anthony Udofia
- Succeeded by: Theophilus Bamigboye

Military Administrator of Abia State
- In office August 1998 – 29 May 1999
- Preceded by: Moses Fasanya
- Succeeded by: Orji Uzor Kalu

Personal details
- Born: 13 January 1952 Nigeria
- Died: 1 January 2022 (aged 69)

Anthony Obi (13 January 1952 – 1 January 2022) was a Nigerian Lieutenant Colonel who served as Military Administrator of Osun State from August 1996 to August 1998, during the military regime of General Sani Abacha. He then became Military Administrator of Abia State in August 1998, handing over power to the civilian governor Orji Uzor Kalu in May 1999.

== Life and career ==
Obi was born on 13 January 1952. He inherited problems in Osun State with conflict between the Ife and Modakeke people, which periodically erupted into violence. A crisis was triggered when his administration decided to move the local council headquarters from one town to the other. Anthony Obi set up a Royal Committee to make recommendations on resolving the crisis, and declared a seven-day fasting and prayer program in March 1998 concentrating on peace in Ile-Ife.

During his administration of Osun State, he commissioned a water corporation office in Ifetedo, but did not provide adequate water supplies. When two factions of the union of Local Government Employees began publishing two rival newsletters, Anthony Obi banned them both.

In September 1998, Lieutenant Colonel Anthony Obi told reporters that the 31 members of the Provisional Ruling Council and all 36 state military administrators would declare their assets, in line with General Abdulsalami Abubakar's intention to hand over a clean administration to civilian rulers in May 1999.

As administrator of Abia State, he built Camp Neya, a government retreat and golf course in undulating country in Igbere, commissioned on his last day in power on 28 May 1999.

Obi died on 1 January 2022, at the age of 69.
