= Adekunle Lawal =

Nigerian politician (1934–1980)

Admiral Adekunle Shamusideen Lawal

Military Governor of Lagos State
- In office July 1975 – 1977
- Preceded by: Mobolaji Johnson
- Succeeded by: Ndubuisi Kanu

Military Governor of Imo State
- In office 1977 – July 1978
- Preceded by: Ndubuisi Kanu
- Succeeded by: Sunday Ajibade Adenihun

Personal details
- Born: 8 February 1934 Lagos, British Nigeria (now in Lagos State, Nigeria)
- Died: 27 November 1980 (aged 46)

Military service
- Allegiance: Nigeria
- Branch/service: Nigerian Navy
- Years of service: 1963–1980
- Rank: Admiral

Adekunle Shamusideen Lawal (8 February 1934 – 27 November 1980) was a Nigerian Naval Admiral who served as military Governor of Lagos State from 1975 to 1977 and military Governor of Imo State from 1977 to 1978.

== Early life and education ==
Adekunle Shamusideen Lawal was born on 8 February 1934 to Ayinde Sulemon Lawal and Ejide Afusat Disu-Lawal in Lagos, Western Region, British Nigeria now Lagos State Nigeria.

He started his education at Holy Cross Cathedral School, Lagos, Nigeria (1942–1945) and St Peters Faji School, Lagos Nigeria (1945–1949). His secondary education was completed at the Methodist Boys’ High School in Lagos (1950–1955), where he received seven GCE (Cambridge University) O’Levels, after which he went on to receive his Advanced Level Certificate of Education (A-levels) in three subjects (1958). He studied at the College of Technology in Zaria, Nigeria. In 1960 he was elected member of the Institute of Mechanical Engineers. He worked with the Ministry of Works and Survey in Lagos, Nigeria as Assistant Technical Officer in training (Mechanical) (July to October 1959). He attended the Ahmadu Bello University, Zaria, Nigeria (1960–1963), from where he graduated in 1963 with B.Sc.(Eng) Honors degree in Mechanical Engineering. He had a CMarEng and FIMarEng (Chartered member and a Fellow member of the Institute of Marine Engineering) and CNSE and FNSE (Chartered and a Fellow member of the Nigerian Society of Engineers), and FSS and PSC.

Adekunle Lawal joined the Royal Nigerian Navy in September 1963 as a Sub-Lieutenant. In 1964 he was promoted to Lieutenant. In March 1964 he attended a Marine Engineering course with the Royal Naval Ships in Rotterdam, Holland. He obtained is Chartered Marine Engineer status in March 1964. In 1966 he was promoted to Lieutenant Commander. From 1969 to 1971, he attended the Defence Naval Staff College in Wellington, India, where he received his M.Sc.(Eng). As a post-graduate he was attached to the Naval Dock Yard in Bombay, India from 1970 to 1971. He was Chief of Material in the Nigerian Navy from 1973 to 1978 and was a member of the Supreme Military Council S.M.C. from 1972 to 1975 during the General Yakubu Gowon administration. Adekunle Lawal was also appointed to the Board of the Nigerian Port Authority as a full board member from 1972 to 1975. Adekunle Lawal also served as the Chief Engineer on numerous naval vessels including the NNS Ogoja, NNS Beecroft and the NNS Nigeria during his time with the Nigerian Navy.

He became a member of the United States Naval Institute, whose mission is the advancement of Professional, Literary and Scientific knowledge in the Navy, 1972.

He was transferred to become Governor of Imo State. held this position from July 1977 to 1978, after he resumed his career in the Nigerian Navy as Director of Material Engineering. He worked back at the dockyard with no exit point.

== Military governorship ==
He was appointed Military Governor of Lagos State in July 1975 after the Nigerian Civil War brought General Murtala Mohammed to power. As the governor of the most populous state in Nigeria, one of the major challenges faced by his administration was managing the chaotic traffic problem. During the World Black and African Festival of Arts and Culture, he implemented an odd-even rationing traffic system to ease congestion in the state. Car owners whose license plates began with even numbers were not allowed on most streets on Mondays, Wednesdays and Fridays, and those with odd numbers on Tuesdays, Thursdays and Saturdays. He was Lagos State Military Governor until 1977 when he was transferred to become governor of Imo State in 1977. He held this position until July 1978, after which he resumed his career in the Nigerian Navy as Director of Material (Engineering).

Adekunle Lawal voluntarily retired from the Nigerian Navy as an admiral in 1979, and after an illness he died in November 1980. He is survived by his wife Mrs. Taiwo Adefunmilayo Olufunmilayo Lawal née Adesanya and his six children.
