= Orji Uzor Kalu =

Nigerian politician and businessman (born 1960)

Orji Uzor Kalu MON

Senator for Abia North
- Incumbent
- Assumed office 11 June 2019
- Preceded by: Mao Ohuabunwa

Senate Majority Whip
- In office 2 July 2019 – 11 June 2023
- Succeeded by: Mohammed Ali Ndume

7th Governor of Abia State
- In office 29 May 1999 – 29 May 2007
- Deputy: Enyinnaya Abaribe (1999–2003); Chima Nwafor (2003–2006); Acho Nwakanma (2006–2007)
- Preceded by: Anthony Obi
- Succeeded by: Theodore Orji

Personal details
- Born: 21 April 1960 (age 65) Abia State, Nigeria
- Party: All Progressives Congress
- Education: Bachelor of Arts degree
- Alma mater: Abia State University
- Occupation: Politician; Businessperson

Orji Uzor Kalu MON (born 21 April 1960) is a Nigerian politician and businessman who is the senator representing Abia North Senatorial District. He served as governor of Abia State from 29 May 1999 to 29 May 2007. Kalu is the chairman of SLOK Holding and the Daily Sun and New Telegraph newspapers in Nigeria.

Prior to his election, he served as the chairman of the Borno Water Board and the chairman of the Cooperative and Commerce Bank Limited. Kalu was also a member of the Peoples Democratic Party (PDP), Progressive Peoples Alliance (PPA) and the chairman of the PPA Board of Trustees. He was the party's presidential candidate in the April 2007 general election. He is currently a member of the ruling All Progressive Congress (APC) after he officially announced his resignation as the PPA BOT chair.

Orji Uzor Kalu contested in the 2019 Nigerian general election to represent the people of Abia North in the senate, running under the banner of All Progressives Congress. He defeated the incumbent senator Mao Ohuabunwa with over 10,000 votes.

== Background ==
Kalu was born to the family of Mr. Johnson Uzor Nesiegbe Kalu and Mrs Eunice Kalu.

With only $35 to his name that he had borrowed from his mother, Kalu began trading palm oil, first buying the oil from Nigeria's eastern regions and then selling it in the country's northern regions. He then began buying and reselling furniture on a large scale.

Kalu eventually established SLOK Holding, a conglomerate that would consist of a number of successful companies, including the Ojialex Furniture Company, SLOK Nigeria Limited, SLOK United Kingdom Limited, Adamawa Publishers Limited, SLOK Vegetable Oil, Aba, SLOK Paper Factory, Aba, SLOK United States Incorporated, SLOK Ghana, Togo, Cotonou, Guinea, South Africa, Liberia, Botswana, SLOK Korea, Supreme Oil Limited, SLOK Airlines, Sun Publishing Limited, and First International Bank Limited.

Kalu became the youngest Nigerian to receive the National Merit Award from President Ibrahim Babangida, at the age of 26 in 1986. He was selected as the Nigerian Chamber of Commerce's Industrialist of the Year, and awarded the Humanitarian Award of the University of Nigeria, Nsukka's Humanitarian Club, the Volunteer Award of the International Association of Volunteers, the National Merit Award, the EU Special Award in Brussels, and the World Bank Leon Sullivan Award.

== Education ==
He attended Christ the King School Aba and Government College Umuahia. After studying at Barewa College, Zaria, he enrolled in the University of Maiduguri where he studied political science. During his time at the university, Kalu became a student activist, and participated in the "Ali Must Go" riots against the education minister. His participation resulted in his suspension. While his fellow students later took the school authorities to court, Kalu left school to build his own business.

Kalu has a degree from Abia State University, a Certificate in Business Administration from Harvard University and honorary doctorates from the universities of Maiduguri and Abia State.

== Corporate and political background ==
Kalu headed First International Bank Limited at the age of 33. He also stewarded Nigerian commercial relations with China's SinoPacific Shipbuilding company while serving as a principal of SLOK Holding.

On 11 July 2007, Kalu was arrested by the Economic and Financial Crimes Commission on charges of corruption while serving as the governor of Abia State. He was later released on bail, and accused the Obasanjo regime of persecuting him during and after his tenure in office, an accusation mentioned by former U.S. Ambassador to Nigeria John Campbell in his book, "Nigeria: Dancing on the Brink."

Kalu has been a staunch supporter of President Muhammadu Buhari, a "close friend and father, who deserves all the support to make Nigeria better."

On 8 August 2023, he was named the chairman, Senate committee on privatization in the 10th senate.

== Newspapers ==
Kalu is the chairman of the Daily Sun, a Nigerian daily print newspaper founded and published in Ikeja, Lagos, Nigeria. The newspaper had a daily circulation of 130,000 copies as of 2011, and 135,000 for weekend titles, with an average of 80% sales. The Daily Sun was the highest selling newspaper in Nigeria https://www.newspapers-list.com/nigeria/the-sun-nigeria.php. The Daily Sun was incorporated on 29 March 2001, and began production as a weekly Newspaper on 18 January 2003, and as a daily newspaper on 16 June 2003. The newspaper is similar in format to The Sun in the United Kingdom.

Kalu is also the chairman of the New Telegraph, with a circulation of 100,000 copies per day. The newspaper targets domestic and foreign readers in major urban centers throughout the country and offers objective coverage of political, social, and cultural issues.

== Njiko Igbo Movement ==
Kalu is involved with the Njiko Igbo Movement, whose purpose is to help secure the presidential seat for a Nigerian citizen of Igbo extraction; an Igbo has only held the position of head of state for six months since Nigeria became a presidential republic in 1966.

The movement has branches and support groups throughout the diaspora. Kalu launched the organization together with former Nigerian Senator Emmanuel Onwe, a human rights advocate and lawyer earlier based in the United Kingdom.

== Conviction ==
Kalu was convicted by the Lagos Division of the Federal High Court on Thursday, 5 December 2019 and sentenced to 12 years in prison for N7.65 billion fraud. He was convicted for defrauding the government of Abia State where he was a governor for 8 years using his company, Slok Nigeria Limited. Days after the court ordered the forfeiture of the company, Nigeria anti graft agency, Economic and Financial Crimes Commission, EFCC commenced the process of winding down Slok Nigeria Limited including The Sun Publishing Ltd which was not part of the charges. Consequently, The Sun Publishing Ltd approached a high Court in Lagos for interpretation of the judgment that convicted Kalu and Slok Nigeria Limited asking the court to compel EFCC to stay away from The Sun Publishing Ltd since it was not part of the court case. He was held in custody at the Ikoyi prisons in Lagos.

In December, Kalu filed a bail application at a Lagos High Court pending the determination of his appeal against his conviction. On 23 December 2019 the court rejected his bail application for lack of merit.

On Friday, 8 May 2020, the Supreme Court of Nigeria ruled that his trial was wrongly conducted and released him from prison while ordering a retrial.

On Friday morning, the Supreme Court deemed Mr Kalu's conviction inappropriate and ordered a retrial of the case, according to multiple media reports out of the court.

A seven-member panel of the apex court, in a unanimous verdict delivered by Justice Ejembi Eko, declared that the conviction null and void, Channels TV reported Friday.

According to the report, Justice Eko declared that Justice Mohammed Idris, who convicted Mr Kalu, had already become a justice of the Court of Appeal, when he ruled and sentenced Mr Kalu and his co-defendant as a trial judge.

He held that a Justice of the Court of Appeal cannot operate as a judge of the Federal High Court, and ordered the Chief Judge of the Federal High Court to reassign the case for trial. Kalu was released from the custody of the Nigerian Correctional Service Kuje on Wednesday 3 June 2020.

== Personal life ==
Kalu married Ms. Ifeoma Ada Menakaya in December 1989, and they got married in his hometown of Igbere, Abia State.

He has four children namely: Neya Uzor Kalu, Michael Uzor Kalu, Olivia Uzor Kalu, and Nicole Uzor Kalu.

== Timeline ==
- 1999: He was elected as the Governor of Abia State on People's Democratic Party (PDP).
- 2003: He was re-elected as Governor.
- 2006: He left People's Democratic Party (PDP) and found Progressive People's Alliance (PPA).
- 2007: He contested for the Presidential Seat on the PPA platform.
- 2007: His corruption trial began and he was arrested by the Economic and Financial Crimes Commission (EFCC) in 2007.
- 2011: He contested as the Abia North Senatorial candidate on the PPA platform.
- 2012: He re-joined the Peoples Democratic Party (PDP).
- 2015: He later returned to Progressive People's Alliance (PPA) to contest for the Senatorial Election.
- 2016: The Supreme court ruled that he should stand trial, this was nine years after his legal battle with the EFCC.
- 2016: He joined the All Progressives Congress (APC) political party.
- 2018: He was given the Title: Danbaiwan-Hausa (Gifted Son of Hausa kingdom) by the Emir of Daura in President Muhammadu Buhari's hometown.
- 2019: He contested for the Abia State Senatorial Election and he won.
- 2019: He was convicted and jailed 12 years for corruption in December 2019.
- 2020: He was released from prison by the judgement of the Supreme Court who ruled on Friday, 8 May that he was wrongfully convicted. The Supreme Court ordered a re-trial.

== See also ==
- List of governors of Abia State
