= Sam Mbakwe =

Nigerian politician (1929–2004)

1st Governor of Imo State
- In office 1 October 1979 – 31 December 1983
- Preceded by: Sunday Ajibade Adenihun
- Succeeded by: Ike Nwachukwu

Personal details
- Born: 1929 Avutu, British Nigeria
- Died: 6 January 2004 (aged 74) Avutu, Obowu, Nigeria
- Party: Nigerian People's Party (NPP)
- Spouse(s): Victoria Ahuikpeghe Ugwoji and Late Florence Nwaeruru Egbuka
- Profession: lawyer, political scientist

Samuel Onunaka Mbakwe (1929 – 5 January 2004) also known as Dee Sam, was a Nigerian politician who served as the first executive governor of Imo State from 1 October 1979 until 31 December 1983.

== Early life and education ==
Map of Biafra, including Owerri and Port Harcourt.

Mbakwe began his education in 1937 at St Peter's Primary School, Umulogho. His contemporaries include The Reverend Canon Jeremiah Anyanwu, the first Anglican priest in the old Etiti Local Government Area of Imo State, who was born at about the same time with him in Avutu. He studied at the Teachers Training College, Oleh, Isoko, from 1946 to 1947, and at Fourah Bay College in Sierra Leone in 1952. He moved on to the University of Manchester (1953–56), the University of Hull (1956–58), and finally the school run by the Inns of Court (1958–59), all in England, before returning to Nigeria to practice law in Port Harcourt, Eastern Region. Mbakwe served as an Administrator of Okigwe Province in the Republic of Biafra, an Igbo secessionist state in southeastern Nigeria, during the 1967–70 Civil War.

== Political career ==
Mbakwe joined the Constituent Assembly in 1978 and became governor on 1 October of the following year. One of the main priorities of his administration was to improve Imo State's roads. He was re-elected, but his second term was interrupted by General Muhammadu Buhari's military coup of 31 December 1983, which brought about the end of the Second Republic. Described as "controversial," he said the following about politicians in September 1995: "If you have not been in prison before, that will be your baptism and qualification. You will learn from the prison yard that not all those in detention are criminals."

Mbakwe earned the nickname "the weeping governor" for crying while trying to convince the federal government to pay more attention to his state; the first occasion of his famed tears was the Ndiegoro flood in Aba, which was then a part of Imo State. He had invited President Shehu Shagari to witness the destruction done by the floods, and it was said that he was moved to tears while conducting the president around the disaster area.

In 1981, the Sam Mbakwe International Cargo Airport, which is now named after him, was commissioned by his administration after having been built through citizens' donations. In 1981, Sam Mbakwe set up Imo State University. The campus was located in a territory that was ceded to Abia State in 1991 and was re-christened Abia State University. However, Imo State University acquired a new campus in Owerri and still exists.

== Legacy ==
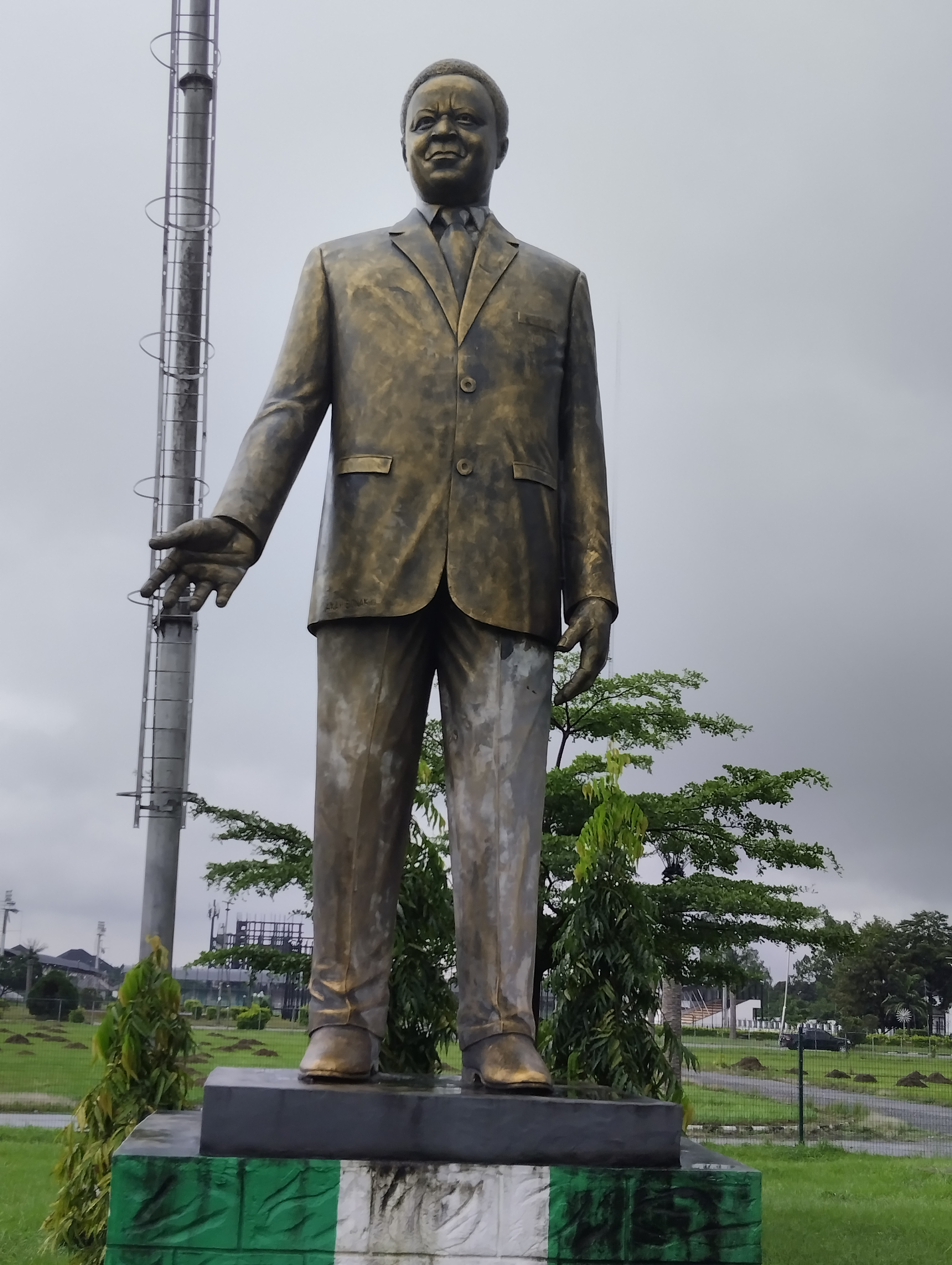
Statue of Sam Mbakwe in Imo State.

Mbakwe is remembered for patriotism and notable contributions to the state's socio-economic development. Some of the projects recorded under his watch are the Imo State University (IMSU), Owerri, and the Sam Mbakwe Airport, Owerri. Major efforts were also made in industrialization, road development, agriculture (he built a large poultry farm in Obowo), establishment of a paper mill where books and toilet paper were made, and provision of potable water. Older generations of the state's indigenes often express disappointment with the performance of the state's later governors compared with Mbakwe's. In the context of poor governance and worsening insecurity and a plethora of other challenges they look back to a period in which their governor worked hard to attract development to the state.

== Death ==
On 6 January 2004, Mbakwe died at his home in Avutu.
