= Sunday Ajibade Adenihun =

Nigerian military governor

Brigadier General Sunday Ajibade Adenihun

Military Governor of Imo State
- In office July 1978 – October 1979
- Preceded by: Adekunle Lawal
- Succeeded by: Samuel Onunaka Mbakwe

Personal details
- Born: 12 March 1939 Aduasa, Ghana
- Died: 25 November 2008 (aged 69)

Military service
- Allegiance: Nigeria
- Branch/service: Nigerian Army
- Rank: Brigadier General

Sunday Ajibade Adenihun was appointed military governor of Imo State in Nigeria from July 1978 to October 1979 during the military regime of General Olusegun Obasanjo.

Adenihun was born on 12 March 1939 in Aduasa in Ghana. He attended the Baptist Boy's High School, Oyo from 1956 to 1960, after which he joined the Nigerian Army. His military training took him to Regimental Signal School, Hythe, England (1964), Junior Division Staff College, Warminster, England (1971) and Army Command and Staff College, Jaji (1976). Adenihun was Commander, Training Depot (1970–73), Deputy Quartermaster-General, Defence Headquarters (1973–75) and General Officer Commanding, 3rd Infantry Division, Jos (1975–78).

Between 1978 and 1979, the then Colonel Adenihun was military governor of old Imo State. Bob Njemanze from the Njemanze ruling dynasty in Owerri, Imo State described him as "a young man with so much vigour and vision but without time to conclude anything." However, he did introduce simple but effective procedures for ridding the towns of the state of the mountains of garbage that had been accumulating.

In October 1979 Adenihun handed over to the administration of the first civilian governor of Imo State in the Nigerian Second Republic, Chief Samuel Onunaka Mbakwe. He died of a heart attack in the United States on 25 November 2008.
