= Enyinnaya Abaribe =

Nigerian politician (born 1955)

Prof. Enyinnaya Abaribe

Senator for Abia South
- Incumbent
- Assumed office 5 June 2007
- Preceded by: Adolphus Wabara

Senate Minority Leader
- In office 2 July 2019 – 27 May 2022
- Succeeded by: Philip Aduda

Deputy Governor of Abia State
- In office 29 May 1999 – 7 March 2003
- Governor: Orji Uzor Kalu
- Succeeded by: Chima Nwafor

Personal details
- Born: 1 March 1955 (age 71) Aba, Eastern Region, British Nigeria (now in Abia State, Nigeria)
- Party: All Progressives Grand Alliance (since 2022)
- Other political affiliations: Peoples Democratic Party (before 2022)
- Spouse: Florence Morris
- Children: 3
- Occupation: Politician

Enyinnaya Harcourt Abaribe (born 1 March 1955) is a Nigerian politician who has served as the senator representing Abia South senatorial district since 2007. He previously served as deputy governor of Abia State from 1999 until his resignation and subsequent impeachment in March 2003. He was the minority leader in the 9th senate.

In January 2020, Abaribe during a motion against worsening insecurity in Nigeria, asked President Muhammadu Buhari to resign reminding president Buhari that Nigerians voted him into power in 2015 and renewed his mandate in 2019 to tackle the security situation in the country. Abaribe said Buhari had made a promise while campaigning for the presidency in 2015 that Nigerians should stone him (Buhari) out of government should he fail to improve the security situation in the country. “Nigerians voted a government into power. We are going with stones to stone them now because they have failed", Abaribe's motion in the senate concluded.

== Education ==
Abaribe earned his WASSCE from Government College Umuahia in 1974. He went on to the University of Benin, where he received a bachelor's degree in economics in 1979 and a master's degree in economics in 1982. He lectured at Edo State University from 1982 until 1985.

== Business career ==
From 1985 until 1991, he was SCOA Nigeria's area manager for Southern Nigeria. After that, from 1991 to 1992, he was employed as Nicon's senior manager for investment. From 1993 until 1995 he was the CEO of Integrated Mortgage Co.

== Political career ==
=== Deputy governorship and gubernatorial run ===
Abaribe became Abia State's Deputy Governor after Orji Uzor Kalu's 1999 election to the Governorship. The state's House of Assembly impeached the deputy governor twice in 2000 and a third time in 2003; as he was facing his third impeachment, he resigned on 7 March 2003, sending his resignation via DHL so as to have written record of it. The House of Assembly formally voted him out of office several days later, in a move Abaribe called "medicine after death". He was succeeded as deputy governor by Eric Acho Nwakanma. Abaribe ran for the governorship on the All Nigeria Peoples Party (ANPP) platform in 2003, but lost to Kalu.

=== Senatorial career ===
Abaribe was elected to the national Senate in 2007 on a People's Democratic Party (PDP) ticket; Eric Acho Nwakanma of the PPA challenged the validity of the election.

Abaribe is Vice Chairman of the Senate Committee on Inter-Parliamentary Affairs (Senator Abdulaziz Usman of Jigawa-North East is chairman). He is also a member of the Committees on the Independent National Electoral Commission, Senate Services, and Works. In October 2007, as Ralph Uwazuruike, leader of the banned secessionist organization Movement for the Actualisation of the Sovereign State of Biafra (MASSOB), was on trial for treason, Abaribe and six other southeastern senators protested at the Federal High Court in Lagos to demand his release.

Abaribe was reelected for Abia South in the April 2011 election. He is currently the chairman Senate Committee on Media and Publicity.

Abaribe was re-elected to the Nigerian 8th senate on the platform of the Peoples Democratic Party in 2015 and is currently representing the people of Abia South Senatorial District in the upper chamber. On 13 June 2019 he was appointed as the Minority leader of the Senate.

He was re-elected in the 2023 election in an election victory over other candidates with a 49,693 vote poll to win Abia South senatorial district.

He was named the chairman of the Senate committee on power of the 10th senate on 8 August 2023.

== Arrest and release ==
On 22 June 2018, Abaribe was arrested by the Department of State Security Services (DSS) at his barber shop located at Transcorp Hilton Hotel, Abuja for his alleged links with the Indigenous People of Biafra being one of the sureties to their leader Nnamdi Kanu, he was taken to his house for a search and was later taken to the DSS detention in Abuja. He was released the next Tuesday, 26 June 2018 on bail.
