= Theodore Orji =

Nigerian politician (born 1950)

His Excellency Theodore Orji CON
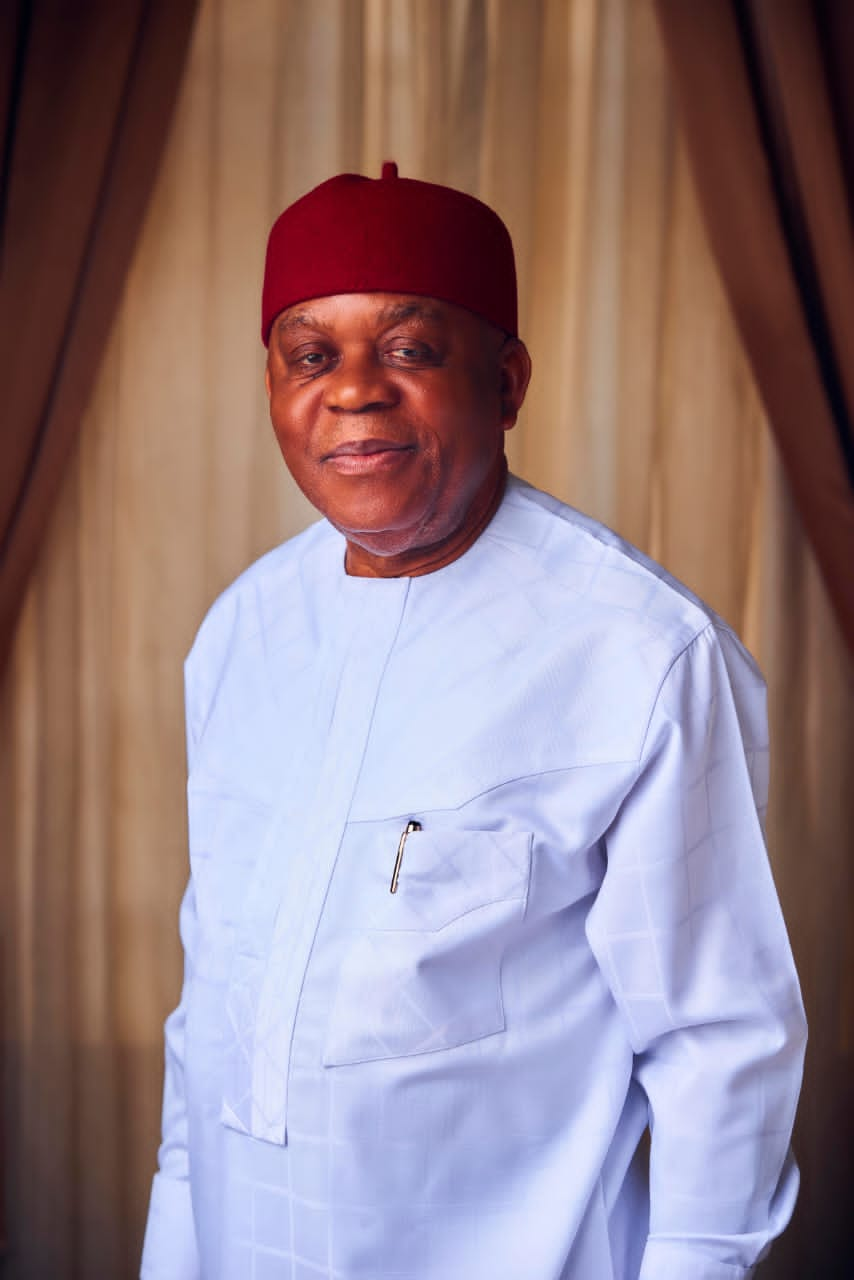

Senator for Abia Central
- In office 9 June 2015 – 11 June 2023
- Preceded by: Nkechi Justina Nwaogu
- Succeeded by: Darlington Nwokocha

8th Governor of Abia State
- In office 29 May 2007 – 29 May 2015
- Deputy: Chris Akomas (2007–2010); Acho Nwakanma (2010–2011); Emeka Ananaba (2011–2015)
- Preceded by: Orji Uzor Kalu
- Succeeded by: Okezie Ikpeazu

Personal details
- Born: Theodore Ahamefule Orji; 9 November 1950 (age 75) Umuahia, Southern Region, British Nigeria (now in Abia State, Nigeria)
- Party: Peoples Democratic Party (before 2006; 2010–present)
- Other political affiliations: Progressive Peoples Alliance (2006–2010)
- Spouse: Mercy Odochi Orji
- Children: 5, including Chinedum Orji
- Occupation: Politician

Theodore Ahamefule Orji CON (born 9 November 1950) is a Nigerian politician who served as the senator representing Abia Central senatorial district from 2015 to 2023. He previously served as the governor of Abia State from 2007 to 2015. He was a career civil servant, and served as chief of staff to the Abia State governor, Orji Uzor Kalu.

== Early life, education and career ==
Orji was born on 9 November 1950 in Amaokwe-Ugba, Ibeku, Umuahia. He attended St. Michael's Catholic Primary School, Umuahia, and proceeded to Santa Crux Secondary School, Olokoro, before completing his secondary education at Holy Ghost College, Owerri. He earned a Bachelor of Arts degree in English from the University of Ibadan in 1977. He completed his National Youth Service Corps programme in Sokoto State in 1978.

Before becoming the governor of Abia State, Orji was formerly a career civil servant where he served at the Abia State Government House as a principal secretary. He was later appointed chief of staff to the then Abia State governor, Orji Uzor Kalu.

=== Public service ===
After completing the National Youth Service Corps programme, he began working as an administrative officer in the old Imo State Civil Service Commission in 1979. When Abia State was created in 1991, Orji returned to Umuahia, where he served in several administrative positions, including the Government House, Umuahia, Bureau of Budget and Planning and Ministry of Agriculture.

In March 1996, he was seconded to the National Electoral Commission of Nigeria (NECON), now INEC, Abia State, as the administrative secretary. He was later reassigned to Enugu State in 1997 to supervise the elections that ushered in the current democratic dispensation in Nigeria. After the polls, Orji returned to Abia State, where he subsequently served in various capacities in the Cabinet Office, Ministry of Lands and Survey, Ministry of Agriculture, and Abia State Government House.

=== Political career ===
In December 2006, Orji won the gubernatorial primaries of the Progressive Peoples Alliance (PPA) to contest the 2007 governorship elections in Abia State. On 14 April 2007, he was elected governor of Abia State, as declared by the Independent National Electoral Commission, INEC. He was sworn in on 29 May 2007 as the third executive governor of Abia State. In 2011, he re-contested and won a second term.

He served as a Senator of the Federal Republic of Nigeria, where he chaired the Senate Committee on Privatization and was the vice chairman, Senate Committee on Agriculture.

In 2021, Orji announced his retirement from active politics after completing his second tenure as Senator, representing Abia Central Senatorial District.

== Tenure ==
=== Legacy projects ===
While in office, Orji constructed and completed the 10,000-capacity International Conference Center in Umuahia. In 2015, Orji commissioned several Federal High Court complexes in Abia State. He is also responsible for the reconstruction of the Abia State House of Assembly as well as the construction of 28 constituency offices at the complex for members of parliament. In 2012 The Nation, described the construction of the Ministry of Justice in Abia State as a "legacy".

- High Court Aba
- Old High Court and Old Magistrates Court
- Construction of ASEPA Complex
- Worker's Secretariat and Dialysis Centre

== Corruption allegations and EFCC investigation ==
In February 2020, the Economic and Financial Crimes Commission announced an investigation into Orji and his sons, Chinedu and Ogbonna based on a petition the commission received in 2017. The petition, filed by the Fight Corruption: Save Nigeria Group, outlined over ₦500 billion in public funds that were allegedly stolen by Orji and his family. The money was supposedly ₦383 billion from federal accounts, ₦55 billion in excess crude revenue, ₦2.3 billion from SURE-P funds, ₦1.8 billion from ecological funds, a ₦10.5 billion First Bank loan, a ₦4 billion Diamond Bank loan, a ₦12 billion Paris Club refund, a ₦2 billion agricultural loan for farmers, and ₦55 billion in Abia State Oil Producing Areas Development Commission funds along with other government money including a ₦500 million monthly security fund. Later in February 2020, Orji was questioned by the EFCC in relation to the investigation; his son and Abia State House of Assembly Speaker Chinedu Orji was also interrogated as the investigation found that Chinedu had around 100 bank accounts that could have been used to hide the stolen money.

On 19 August 2021, Orji was arrested at the Nnamdi Azikiwe International Airport after he failed to abide by his release conditions. As a part of his release from EFCC custody in 2020, Orji had to forfeit his passport; however, the commission later returned his passport so Orji could travel to Dubai for medical attention and Orji had refused to give the passport back. Later that day, Chinedu turned himself in and was taken into custody. Both were interrogated before being released on bail and told to return for future questioning.

As of August 2022, Orji remained under investigation by the EFCC.

== Personal life ==
Orji has been recognised and conferred many traditional titles, including Ochendo Ibeku, Utuagbaigwe of Ngwaland, and Ohazurume of Abia South. He is married to Mercy Odochi Orji, and they have five children.

== See also ==
- List of governors of Abia State
