= Progressive Peoples Alliance =

Political party in Nigeria

- National Chairman: Chief Peter Ojonugwa Ameh
- Founded: 2006
- Headquarters: Abuja, Nigeria
- Ideology: Progressivism; Federalism; Anti-communism; Trade Unionism
- Colours: Light blue
- Seats in the Senate: 1 / 109
- Seats in the House: 3 / 360
- Governorships: 0 / 36

The Progressive Peoples Alliance (PPA) is a political party in Nigeria.

The party won gubernatorial elections in 2003 and 2007 in Abia State. The party also won the governorship election in 2007 in Imo State. The Governor of Abia State is Chief Theodore Ahamefula Orji and deputy Comrade Chris Akomas while the Governor of Imo State is Chief Ikedi Ohakim.

In the 21 April 2007 Nigerian National Assembly election, the party won three of the 360 seats in the House of Representatives and one of the 109 seats in the Senate.

Following the April 2007 presidential election, the PPA agreed to join the government of president Umaru Yar'Adua.

== Current party officers ==
National Chairman	Chief Peter Ojonugwa Ameh
National Secretary	Barr. Kehinde Edun
National Treasurer	Mrs. Elizabeth Akpa
National Organizing Secretary	Dr. Noah John Abiodun
National Legal Adviser	Barr. John Otanwa
National Publicity Secretary	Mrs Laura Zarume Tanko
National Woman Leader	Na'ama Bullama
National Auditor	Mr John Okonedo
National Financial Secretary	Barr. Lawrence Adeoye
Deputy National Chairman North	Sir Mohammed Inuwa Haruna
Deputy National Chairman South	Sir Edwin Okonkwo
National Youth Leader	Ralph Gbobor Jack

== Representation ==
The party won some seats at the National Assembly in the 2007 Elections. In the Senate, Senator Uche Chukeumerije representing Abia North Senatorial Zone is the only senator from the party.

In the House of Representatives, the party has two members and these are Hon. Nnanna Uzor Kalu, a two-time member and he represents Aba North/South Federal Constituency. He is the Abia Caucus leader at the House of Representatives and the House Chairman, Sub Committee on Anti-Corruption (Independent Corrupt Practices and other Related Matters Commission, ICPC).

The other member is Rt.Hon. Stanley Ohajiruka, a former Speaker of Abia State House of Assembly. He represents Umuahia North/South/Ikwuano Federal Constituency. Mr Ndongo Lukhana a strong Christian power man representing Abiriba community with the party from 2004-2009 until he had a disagreement with the party official and was accused of using his Christianity power against most of the party agenda. He survived assassination late 2010 and his family was targeted as well thereby forcing him to flee the eastern zone with his family.

Also Mrs Maria Udeh Nwachi won under the platform at Ebonyi state House of Assembly while Mr Godwin Ezeemo, Chukwunaenye contested for Anambra State 2017 Governorship election under the platform.
