= 6th Nigeria National Assembly =

2007–2011 meeting of Nigerian legislature

6th National Assembly
←	5th National Assembly	7th National Assembly	→
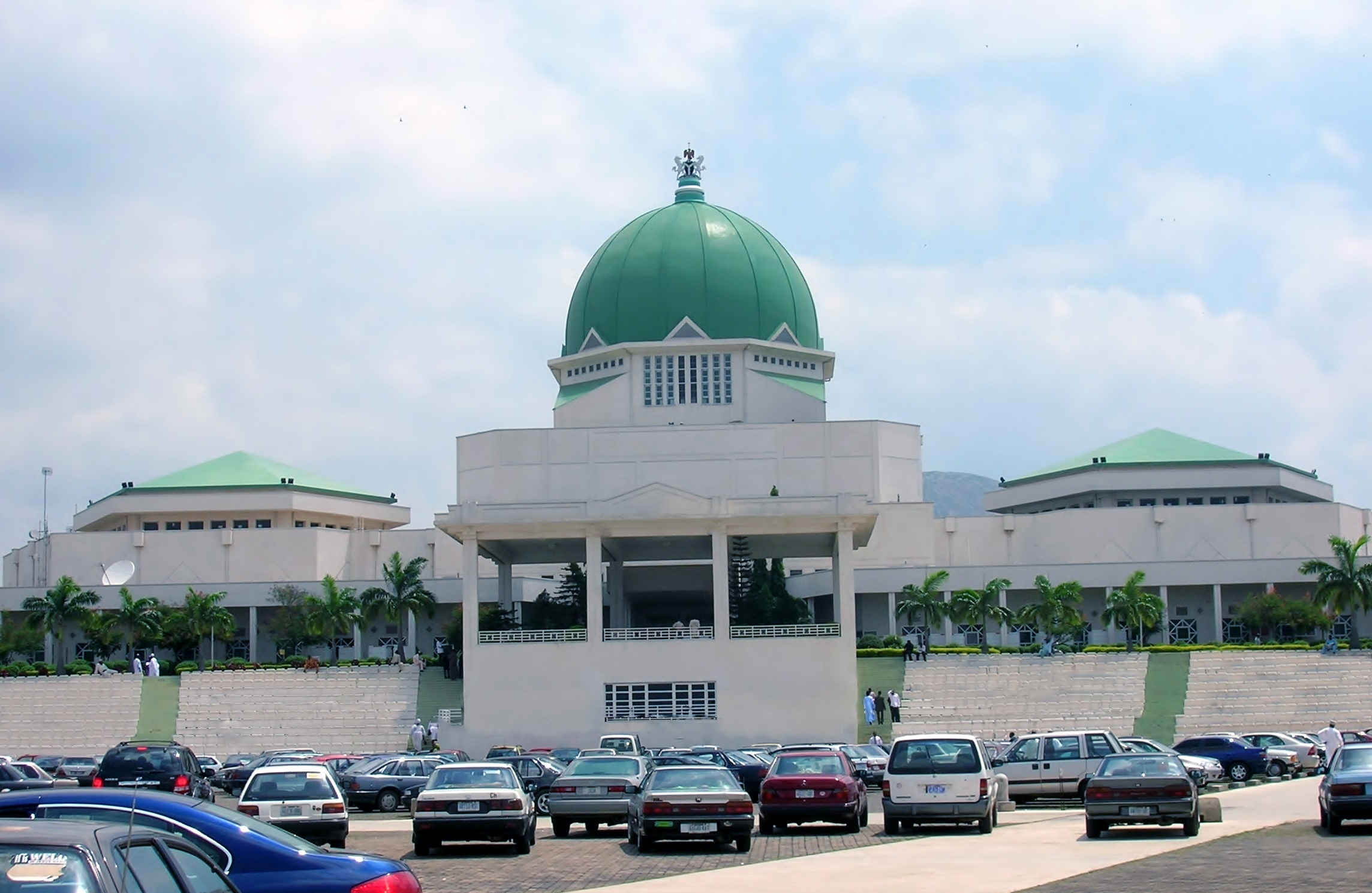
- National Assembly Building

Overview
- Meeting place: National Assembly Complex
- Term: 5 June 2007 – 6 June 2011
- Election: 2007
- Website: Official website

Senate
- Members: 109
- Senate President: David Mark
- Deputy Senate President: Ike Ekweremadu
- Party control: Peoples Democratic Party

House of Representatives
- Members: 360
- Speaker of the House: Patricia Etteh; Dimeji Bankole
- Deputy Speaker of the House: Babangida Nguroje; Usman Bayero Nafada
- Party control: Peoples Democratic Party

The 6th National Assembly of the Federal Republic of Nigeria was a bicameral legislature inaugurated on 5 June 2007 and ran its course till 6 June 2011. The assembly comprises the Senate and the House of Representatives. A total of 360 representatives were elected as members of the House of Representatives, while 109 members were elected to the Senate, making a total of 469 members altogether.

== Presiding officers ==
The Senate President presides over the Senate, the higher chamber while the Speaker presides over the House of Representatives.

David Mark was elected Senate President on the platform of Peoples Democratic Party and Dimeji Bankole, the Speaker of the House of Representatives succeeded Patricia Etteh, who was forced to resign on alleged mismanagement of funds.
