= Chief of Staff to the Speaker, House of Representatives =

Chief of Staff to the speaker of the Nigerian House of Representatives

Chief of Staff to the Speaker
- Incumbent; Jake Dan-Azumi Predecessor= Olanrewaju-Smart Wasiu since 17 October 2023
- House of Representatives (Nigeria)
- Appointer: Tajudeen Abbas

The Chief of Staff to the Speaker, House of Representatives, Federal Republic of Nigeria is a key administrative position responsible for assisting the Speaker of the House of Representatives in managing administrative affairs, coordinating activities, and facilitating communication within the office and with Ministries, Departments and Agencies of government.

== Role and responsibilities ==
The Chief of Staff holds a pivotal role in the Speaker's office and is responsible for the following:

- Administration: Overseeing the administrative functions of the Speaker's office, including managing schedules, appointments, and communications.
- Policy Coordination: Advising the Speaker on legislative matters, policy initiatives, and political strategies.
- Staff Management: Supervising and coordinating the activities of staff and legislative aides working in the Speaker's office.
- Interdepartmental Collaboration: Facilitating communication and collaboration between the Speaker's office and other governmental departments or agencies, officials, and stakeholders.
- Representation: Acting as a representative of the Speaker when necessary, attending meetings, and engaging with stakeholders on behalf of the Speaker.

== List ==
No	Name	Term of Office		Speaker(s) served under
No	Name	Start	End	Speaker(s) served under
1	Amb. Haruna Ginsau	23 July 1999	3 June 2003	Ghali Umar Na’Abba
2	Sen. Abubakar Sadiq YarAdua	3 June 2003	6 June 2007	Aminu Bello Masari
3	Hon. Lanre Abraham Laoshe	6 June 2007	30 October 2007	Patricia Etteh
4	Col. MS Mohammed (rtd)	1 November 2007	31 July 2008	Dimeji Bankole
5	Maurice Ekpenyong	01 August 2008	6 June 2011	Dimeji Bankole
6	Hon. Sada Soli Jibia	6 June 2011	29 May 2015	Aminu Tambuwal
7	Hon. Jerry Manwe	9 June 2015	9 June 2019	Yakubu Dogara
8	Hon. Sanusi Garba Rikiji	11 June 2019	24 March 2022	Femi Gbajabiamila
9	Olanrewaju Smart	12 September 2022	11 June 2023	Femi Gbajabiamila
10	Olanrewaju Smart	13 June 2023	16 October 2023	Abbas Tajudeen
11	Prof. Jake Dan-Azumi	17 October 2023	Present	Abbas Tajudeen

== See also ==
- Speaker of the House of Representatives of Nigeria
- House of Representatives (Nigeria)
