= Bankole =

- Gender: Male
- Language: Yoruba

Origin
- Origin: Nigeria
- Meaning: Build me a house
- Region of origin: South Western Nigeria

Bankole audio is a Nigerian Yoruba name and surname typically given to males. It translates to "Build me a house.". It is commonly used as both a first and last name, reflecting Yoruba cultural values. The diminutive forms include Bámikọ́lé same in meaning and Kọ́lé which is the shorter form.

== Surname ==
- Dimeji Bankole (born 1969), Nigerian politician
- Ademola Bankole (born 1969), Nigerian football manager
- Yomi Bankole (1960–2012), Nigerian table tennis player
- Adunni Bankole (1959–2015), Nigerian society matriarch and businesswoman
- Alani Bankole (born 1941), Nigerian Egba businessman and chieftain
- Ayo Bankole (1935–1976), Nigerian composer
- Herbert Bankole-Bright (1883–1958), Sierra Leonean politician
- Adebayo Johnson Bankole (born 1945), Nigerian politician
- Isaach de Bankolé (born 1957), Ivorian actor
- Kehinde Bankole (born 1985), Nigerian actress, model and television host
- Ornella Bankole (born 1997), French basketball player

== Given name ==
- Bankole Cardoso, Nigerian businessman
- Bankole Adekuoroye (born 1996), Nigerian football player
- Banky W. (born 1981), Nigerian musician and actor
- Bankole Timothy (1923–1994), Sierra Leonean journalist
- Bankole Oki (c. 1919 – 2010), Nigerian lawyer
