= Tajudeen Abbas =

Nigerian politician (born 1965)

The Honourable Tajudeen Abbas GCON

15th Speaker of the House of Representatives of Nigeria
- Incumbent
- Assumed office 13 June 2023
- Deputy: Benjamin Kalu
- Preceded by: Femi Gbajabiamila

Member of the House of Representatives of Nigeria from Kaduna
- Incumbent
- Assumed office 6 June 2011
- Constituency: Zaria

Personal details
- Born: 1 October 1965 (age 60) Kaduna State, Nigeria
- Party: All Progressives Congress
- Spouse(s): Hajiya Fatima Tajuddeen Abbas; Hajiya Hussaina Tajuddeen Abbas
- Education: Ahmadu Bello University; Usman Danfodio University

Tajudeen Abbas GCON (born 1 October 1965) is a Nigerian academic and politician who has been the Speaker of the House of Representatives of Nigeria since 2023, and a member of the house since 2011.

== Early life and education ==
Tajudeen Abbas was born in Kaduna State, Nigeria, on 1 October 1965. He is from Zazzau and holds the princely title of Iyan Zazzau. He graduated from Ahmadu Bello University with a bachelor's degree in 1988, and a master's degree in 1993, and from Usmanu Danfodiyo University with a doctorate in business management in 2010.

== Career ==
From 1993 to 2001, Abbas was a lecturer at Kaduna State University. He was a marketing manager for the Nigerian Tobacco Distribution Company from 2001 to 2005.

In the 2011 election Abbas won a seat in the House of Representatives from the Zaria Federal Constituency. He is the only person to have been reelected from that constituency. During his tenure in the house he was a member of the Commerce, Finance, Defence, Public Procurement, and National Planning and Economic Development committees. He was chair of the Land Transport committee.

On 13 June 2023, Abbas defeated Ahmed Idris Wase and Aminu Sani Jaji to succeed Femi Gbajabiamila as Speaker; 353 out of 359 representatives voted in favour of him.

== Political positions ==
Abbas supports a dedicated ECOWAS standby force meant to deter coups. He supports the creation of a National Institute for Film and Media Technology. He supported the creation of an independent body to oversee the funding of political parties. In 2025, he sponsored legislation with Daniel Asama Ago to implement compulsory voting with a fine of ₦100,000 or six months in prison, but later withdrew the legislation.

== Works cited ==
=== News ===
- "The Abbas Tajudeen you don't know at 59". The Nation. 1 October 2024. Archived from the original on 28 June 2025.
- Akowe, Tony (8 May 2025). "Creative industry can generate 2.7m jobs". The Nation. Archived from the original on 28 June 2025.
- Akowe, Tony (14 May 2025). "How porous borders expose Nigeria to insecurity, by Speaker Abbas". The Nation. Archived from the original on 28 June 2025.
- Busari, Biodun (13 June 2023). "10 key things to know about Tajudeen Abbas, new Speaker of House of Reps". Vanguard.
- Ikpefan, Frank (29 April 2025). "Speaker, others back bill on regulation of party funding". The Nation. Archived from the original on 28 June 2025.
- Omolaoye, Sodiq (13 June 2023). "Abbas Tajudeen elected speaker with 353 votes". The Guardian. Archived from the original on 16 June 2023.
- Orji, Ndubuisi (26 May 2025). "Abbas withdraws compulsory voting bill". The Sun. Archived from the original on 28 June 2025.

=== Web ===
- "Daiga Mieriņa, Speaker of the Saeima". Saeima. Archived from the original on 28 June 2025.
