= 2011 Nigerian parliamentary election =

- 9 April 2011
- House of Representatives
- All 360 seats in the House of Representatives; 160 seats needed for a majority
Party	Leader	Vote %	Seats	+/–
PDP	Ahmadu Ali	46.63	203	−59
ACN	Bisi Akande	17.98	69	+37
CPC	Muhammadu Buhari	14.73	38	New
ANPP	Alh Modu Sherif	10.14	28	−34
LP		3.44	8	+7
APGA	Victor Umeh	1.71	7	+4
Accord		1.17	5	+5
DPP	Umaru Ahmed	1.17	1	+1
PPN		0.47	1	+1
This lists parties that won seats. See the complete results below.
- Senate election
- All 109 seats in the Senate; 56 seats needed for a majority
Party	Seats	+/–
PDP	71	−14
ACN	18	+12
CPC	7	New
ANPP	7	−9
Labour	4	+4
DPP	1	+1
APGA	1	+1
Accord	0	−1
This lists parties that won seats. See the complete results below.

Parliamentary elections were held in Nigeria on 9 April 2011.

== Dates ==
The election was originally scheduled to be held on 2 April. However it was later postponed to 4 April on the originally scheduled day of the election itself as voters turned up in the morning to see ballots had not yet arrived. The next day Attahiru Jega, the head of the Independent National Electoral Commission (INEC), said that "The commission weighed all the options and considered the wide-ranging counsel of Nigerians and decided to reschedule all the elections as follows: Saturday, April 9, senate and house of representatives elections; Saturday, April 16, presidential elections; Tuesday, April 26, state houses of assembly and governorship elections. Some parties have said they won't take part. Without political parties there was no election so INEC has to listen to their comments."

This came after Jega was allocated US$570m budget in August 2010 to overhaul voter lists and acquire more ballot boxes.

== Contesting parties ==
The incumbent People's Democratic Party ran against the Action Congress of Nigeria and the Congress for Progressive Change, amongst others. The CPC appeared to make inroads in the north.

== Campaign ==
The people living in the oil-producing Niger Delta sought political representation that would be strong enough to be able to deal with a cleanup of the polluted parts of their region.

In Kano State, traditional voting along sectarian lines was seen to change in favour of cross-voting for candidates who seemed most capable of delivering on promises of alleviating poverty.

== Conduct ==
In December 2010, bombs went off in Yenegoa, Bayelsa State during a gubernatorial campaign rally. There were also bombings and shooting in the north blamed on Boko Haram. Politicians and police said that the campaign of violence aimed to disrupt the election. Again on 3 March assailants in Abuja attacked a People's Democratic Party rally with a bomb killing three and wounding 21. The police said that the attack occurred just after the state governor Mu'azu Babangida Aliyu made an address and left.

The day before the election a bomb went off by the National Electoral Commission offices in Suleja outside the capital Abuja killing at least eight people. The bombing followed a shooting in Borno state that killed four people, including a member of the incumbent Peoples' Democratic Party. On the day of the election itself another bomb went off in Maiduguri. Yushua Shuaib of the National Emergency Management Agency said there was a possibility of casualties. At least two were later reported to have died. During the campaigning season up to a 100 people were reported to have died in bombings and shootings.

== Results ==
Turnout was reported to be low in the commercial capital of Lagos. Voting in the north continued the next day as there was a high turnout.

Preliminary results indicated that the incumbent People's Democratic Party would lose their parliamentary strength.

The Action Congress of Nigeria made gains in the southwest, where Lagos is located and the Congress for Progressive Change made gains in the north.

High-profile losses included the PDP's Dimeji Bankole, the speaker of the House of Representatives, and former president Olusegun Obasanjo's daughter in the Senate. However the PDP still had just over half of the one-fifth of the seats declared at the time.

Polling in 15 Senatorial districts and 48 federal constituencies were delayed again until 26 April 2011 due to logistical problems.

=== Senate ===
Party	Seats
People's Democratic Party	71
Action Congress of Nigeria	18
Congress for Progressive Change	7
All Nigeria Peoples Party	7
Labour Party	4
Democratic People's Party	1
All Progressives Grand Alliance	1
Total	109
Source: IPU

=== House of Representatives ===
Party	Votes	%	Seats
People's Democratic Party	13,351,647	46.69	203
Action Congress of Nigeria	5,141,856	17.98	69
Congress for Progressive Change	4,212,283	14.73	38
All Nigeria Peoples Party	2,900,306	10.14	28
Labour Party	982,647	3.44	8
Democratic People's Party	489,074	1.71	1
All Progressives Grand Alliance	487,753	1.71	7
Accord	335,760	1.17	5
People's Party of Nigeria	133,651	0.47	1
Allied Congress Party of Nigeria	87,233	0.31	0
Progressive Peoples Alliance	77,765	0.27	0
People for Democratic Change	62,360	0.22	0
National Transformation Party	53,574	0.19	0
PDA	30,644	0.11	0
African Democratic Congress	28,907	0.10	0
Action Congress	18,732	0.07	0
African Liberation Party	15,361	0.05	0
Social Democratic Mega Party	15,236	0.05	0
Kowa Party	14,736	0.05	0
Mega Progressive Peoples Party	14,698	0.05	0
Alliance for Democracy	13,041	0.05	0
People's Action Congress	12,938	0.05	0
National Conscience Party	11,681	0.04	0
African Political System	9,681	0.03	0
United Nigeria Peoples' Party	9,507	0.03	0
National Solidarity Democratic Party	9,252	0.03	0
People's Redemption Party	9,215	0.03	0
ANC	8,556	0.03	0
Democratic Front for People's Federation	7,390	0.03	0
African Renaissance Party	6,958	0.02	0
Change Advocacy Party	6,612	0.02	0
United Democratic Party	6,015	0.02	0
Citizens Popular Party	5,500	0.02	0
Congress for Democratic Change	5,412	0.02	0
Action Party of Nigeria	3,038	0.01	0
Movement for the Restoration of Defence and Democracy	2,856	0.01	0
Justice Party	2,617	0.01	0
Hope Democratic Party	2,561	0.01	0
Fresh Democratic Party	2,156	0.01	0
People's Progressive Party	844	0.00	0
Advanced Congress of Democrats	779	0.00	0
NAP	735	0.00	0
Nigeria People's Congress	693	0.00	0
Allied Congress Party	640	0.00	0
People's Salvation Party	616	0.00	0
Freedom Party of Nigeria	510	0.00	0
Movement of the People Party	495	0.00	0
UPGA	416	0.00	0
Community Party of Nigeria	392	0.00	0
National Reformation Party	308	0.00	0
National Majority Democratic Party	295	0.00	0
DFPD	274	0.00	0
Republican Party of Nigeria	256	0.00	0
MCP	229	0.00	0
New Nigeria People's Party	204	0.00	0
National Movement of Progressive Party	204	0.00	0
NTA	128	0.00	0
People's Mandate Party	127	0.00	0
Better Nigeria Progressive Party	120	0.00	0
FNP	43	0.00	0
Movement for Democracy and Justice	3	0.00	0
Total	28,597,520	100.00	360
Source: INEC

==== Results by state ====
- Bayelsa State
- Federal Capital Territory
- Kwara State
- Nasarawa State
- Taraba State

== See also ==
- Nigerian Senators of the 7th National Assembly
