= O'seun Ogunseitan =

Nigerian journalist

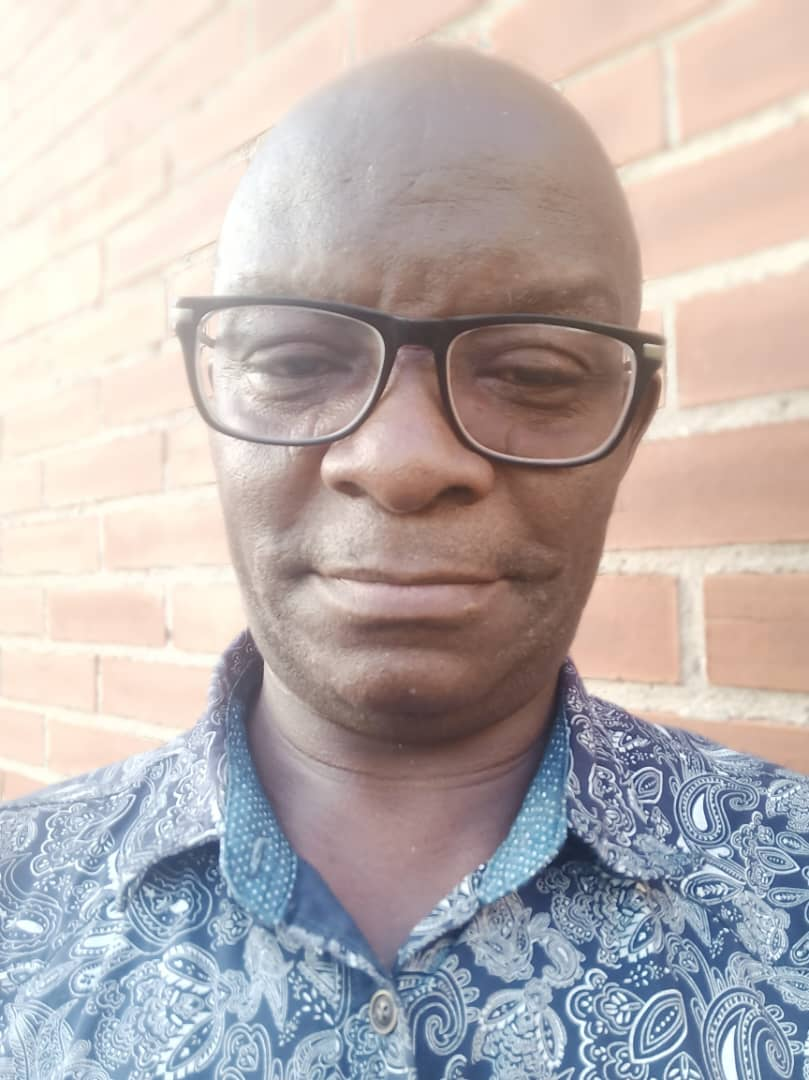
- Born: 31 March 1960 (age 66); Nigeria
- Citizenship: Nigeria
- Occupation: Journalist

O'seun Ogunseitan (born 31 March 1960) is a Nigerian science and technology journalist, digital age media archivist and the pioneer of free e-learning software in Nigeria. He co-authored the book tagged "The Making of the Nigerian Flagship: A Story of the Guardian, Lagos". O'seun is the first Nigerian to digitise and archive Nigerian newspapers on Blu-ray Discs and copy-protected USB flash drives.

== Career ==
O'seun Ogunseitan is a Zoology graduate from the University of Ibadan. He started his journalism career in 1984 when he joined The Guardian newspaper as a reporter. He later became the first Science Editor. Between May 1984 and December 1988, he had handled the agriculture, science, technology and environment beats. He is also an environmental issues journalist, digital-age media archivist and publisher.

While at The Guardian, he broke the story on "Gas leakage: Onne faces air pollution threat" and "Koko Toxic waste dump in Koko town"; He also broke the story of the first Water Hyacinth (Eichornia crassipes) infestations in Nigeria in early 1985.

According to The Guardian, "Both Ogunseitan and Adinoyi-Ojo were among the 'stars that made The Guardian worth N1' published the following day (4 July 1988)"

Years later, O'seun Ogunseitan became The Nation's Science and Technology Editor. At The Nation, he created the first Nigerian newspaper on the world's largest digital-age media disc, the Blu-ray disc, by digitizing and archiving two years of the hard (physical) copies of the newspaper, on a single digital disc as well as on the universally available USB flash drives and SD cards.

Also while at The Nation, O'seun Ogunseitan created Fashola.exe. (Nigeria's first free e-learning software) as reported by The Nation. Fashola.exe is an interactive Macromedia Flash-based Examination practice and tutorial software. It is an e-Learning tutorial software, with thousands of Questions and Answers for Secondary School students in Nigeria.

== Contributions ==
O'seun Ogunseitan was a contributor to the London-based New Internationalist (Wednesday is an Odd day in Lagos) and the Panos Institute.

He is a co-author of "Blaming Others: Prejudice, Race and Worldwide AIDS" (PANOS) 1988. [1]. He has been quoted extensively on the state of Science in Africa and by Elsevier in 1990 in the book, The Discipline of Curiosity: Science in the World.

== Award ==
His story "Gas Leakage: Onne faces air pollution threat", earned him the first prize of the first-ever Nigerian Journalist of the Year Award in 1988. The award was called the UAC Merit Award for Journalists. It was sponsored by the UAC of Nigeria and Unilever of UK.
