= Isyaku =

Isyaku is a given name. Notable people with the name include:

- Isyaku Ibrahim (1936/37–2025), Nigerian politician and businessman
- Isyaku Rabiu (1925–2018), Nigerian businessman and Islamic scholar
