= Ngozi Nwozor-Agbo =

Nigerian journalist (1974-2012)

Ngozi Nwozor
- Born: June 21, 1974; Onitsha, Anambra, Nigeria
- Died: May 28, 2012 (aged 37); Lagos
- Education: University of Nigeria; University of Lagos
- Occupation: Journalist
- Organization: The Nation (Nigeria) Newspapers
- Known for: CampusLife

Ngozi Nwozor-Agbo // (June 21, 1974 - May 28, 2012) was a Nigerian journalist, writer and poet popularly called ‘Lady Campus’. She was popular in Nigeria for initiating the first nationwide campus magazine- CampusLife, a pull-out from The Nation newspapers for students from campuses across Nigeria. She was also popular for training hundreds of young Nigerians to become versatile journalists.

== Early life and career ==
Ngozi Agbo was born in Onitsha, Anambra, Nigeria. She attended the University of Nigeria, Nsukka (UNN), where she studied English. She was actively involved in student activism and was elected the vice president of the Student Union Government of UNN in 1999. She obtained a master's degree in history and international relations from the University of Lagos (UNILAG). Ngozi joined The Nation newspaper in 2007, having previously worked with New Age Newspapers and a non-governmental organisation (NGO), Fate Foundation.

== CampusLife ==
Ngozi Agbor worked with The Nation newspapers and was editor of CampusLife, a weekly pull-out dedicated to student journalists and writers across the tertiary institutions in Nigeria. She trained hundreds of students across Nigeria to practise ethical journalism. She encouraged students from tertiary institutions across Nigeria – universities, polytechnics and monotechnics, colleges of education and related institutions – to contribute stories about their respective institutions.

While working as the editor of CampusLife, Ngozi introduced two initiatives: the CampusLife Student Writers’ workshop, and Student Journalists awards ceremony, sponsored by the Nigerian Bottling Company (NBC) as annual programmes to teach and equip students with the rudiments of journalism and improve their writing and reportorial skills. As a result of CampusLife, The Nation newspaper became a household name in Nigeria and until today is regarded as the widest-circulating newspaper in Nigeria. Many of her students and mentees are today renowned journalists and professionals in their various fields. They include award winning journalist Fisayo Soyombo, Hannah Ojo-Ajakaiye, Wale Ajetunmobi, Gilbert Alasa, Temidayo Ibitoye, Comfort Ogon, Laz Ude-Eze to mention a few.

== Death ==
Ngozi Nwozor died on May 28, 2012, in a Lagos hospital as a result of complications from childbirth, at age 37. Her death was received with great grief across Nigeria, especially among tertiary institution students and the literary community.
