= Alani Bankole =

Nigerian businessman

Chief Suarau Olayiwola Alani Bankole (born September 17, 1941) is a Nigerian Egba businessman and chieftain from Ogun State. He was the Chairman of West African Aluminum Products Plc. He holds the Yoruba chieftaincy titles of the Oluwo of Iporo Ake and the Apena of Egbaland.

== Education and personal life ==
He is an alumnus of the prestigious Baptist Boys' High School in Abeokuta, where he completed his secondary education. He was married to Atinuke Bankole, the Ekerin Iyalode of Egbaland, amongst his other wives who include Adunni Bankole; his son with Atinuke is Dimeji Bankole, a former Speaker of the House of Representatives.

He is also the founder of Freight Agencies Nigeria Ltd, the first freight company in West Africa. Some of his protégés include, Chief Sanya Abiola Chairman CEO Altimax Metal Industries and several captains of industries, governors, senators and house of representatives members.

== Political career ==
He was an Ogun State gubernatorial candidate on three occasions; he ran on the platform of the National Party of Nigeria (NPN) in 1979 and in 1983, but was replaced by Soji Odunjo the latter year. He joined the National Republican Party (NRC) in 1989, and later became a member of the All Nigeria Peoples Party (ANPP). He became National Vice Chairman and later the acting National Chairman Of the party before leaving the party for the People's Democratic Party (PDP) in the year 2000.

In 2004, he predicted a reorganization of Nigerian politics in which the ANPP, PDP, and Alliance for Democracy (AD) would break apart and the remnants would regroup as two parties.
