= Ibitoye =

- Language: Yoruba

Origin
- Origin: Nigerian
- Meaning: "Birth is worth chieftaincy" or "The birth that survives"
- Region of origin: South-west Nigeria

Ibitoyeìbítóoyè is a Nigerian surname of Yoruba origin meaning "Birth is worth chieftaincy" or "The birth that survives." It is derived from the Yoruba words “ìbí” (birth or good birth), “tó” (enough for or worthy of), “oyè” (honor or chieftaincy), “tí ó” (that), and “yè” (survive). Morphologically written as "ìbí-tó-oyè, ìbí-tí-ó-yè".

== Notable people with the name ==
- Gabriel Ibitoye (born 1998) English rugby union player.
- Tobi Ibitoye (born 1993) Musical artist.
- Toyin Ibitoye Nigerian sports analyst and journalist.
- Temidayo Ibitoye Nigerian documentary filmmaker
