= Chibudom Nwuche =

Nigerian politician

Deputy Speaker of the House of Representatives of Nigeria
- In office July 1999 – June 2003
- Speaker: Ghali Umar Na'Abba
- Preceded by: Rabiu Kwankwaso (1993)
- Succeeded by: Babangida Nguroje

Member of the House of Representatives of Nigeria
- In office 1999–2003
- Succeeded by: Osinakachukwu Ideozu
- Constituency: Abua-Odual/Ahoada East

Personal details
- Born: 30 September 1961 (age 64) Enugu, Nigeria
- Party: PDP
- Spouse: Victoria Nwuche
- Education: St Cyprians State School
- Alma mater: Keele University; Aberystwyth University; King's College London
- Occupation: Lawyer and politician

Prince Chibudom Nwuche (//; born 30 September 1961) is a Nigerian lawyer and politician who served as the deputy speaker of the House of Representatives from 1999 to 2003.

== Early life and education ==
Nwuche was born in Enugu into the royal family of Clifford Cheta Nwuche and Grace Ogbuta Nwuche. He is from Ochigba town in Ahoada East in the Local Government Area of Rivers State. He began his educational career at St Cyprians State School in Port Harcourt where he obtained his First School Leaving Certificate. His secondary school education was at the Stella Maris College in Port Harcourt, Rivers State where he graduated with an Ordinary Level School Certificate in 1979. He then proceeded to his advanced Levels at Lansdowne College, Oxford, United Kingdom.

He was educated at Keele University between 1982 and 1985 where he graduated with a Bachelor of Arts (Hons) in politics and philosophy, with subsidiary subjects in history and astronomy. Between 1985 and 1987, Nwuche obtained an LLB (Hons) in law, with a second class upper division at Aberystwyth University after which he returned to Nigeria for the mandatory Bar programme at the Nigerian Law School. He then obtained a master's degree in law (LLM) at King's College London specialising in shipping law, international finance, intellectual property and international commercial law.

== Career ==
After his studies, Nwuche returned to Nigeria. He worked as a legal practitioner Mudiaga Odje and company, Ajumogobia Okeke and Oyebode from 1990 to 1992. He then worked as a consultant for Petgas Resources International Limited from 1992 to 1994. He was managing director of Rheingold Nigeria Limited from 1994 to 1998.

In 1999, Nwuche was elected to represent the Ahoada East/Abua Odual Federal Constituency of Rivers State in the House of Representatives. The House then selected him as its deputy speaker on 4 June. While in the legislature, he was chairman of the Committee of Whole, and vice-chairman of the Committee of Selection and the Joint Committee on the review of the 1999 Constitution. He also led several delegations to various international summits and conferences.

Nwuche sponsored the Women Trafficking and Child Labour Eradication Foundation (WOTCLEF) that established an agency to combat human trafficking. He sponsored the Nigeria Media Bill that amalgamated Nigerian media law and the Nigerian Local Content Bill that expanded indigenous companies' involvement in the oil industry. He was involved with the passage of the Niger Delta Development Commission Act and the Onshore Offshore Dichotomy Bill. He also sponsored the Nigerians with Disability Bill.

Nwuche supported cooperation between the National Assembly and other organisations, including non-governmental organisations and the Organised Private Sector.

Nwuche has set up scholarships and grant schemes for indigent students and small/medium-scale businessmen and women respectively.

== Membership of organisations and boards ==
Nwuche is presently a member of several professional bodies. These include:

- Member, Institute of Directors, Nigeria
- Member, Nigerian Association of Chambers of Commerce, Industry, Mines and Agriculture, NACCIMA
- Member, Institute of Petroleum, London
- Member, Nigerian Institute of Management (NIM)
- Chairman, Trade Group of Nigeria – South Africa Chamber of Commerce (1995)
- Member, Nigerian Bar Association (NBA)
- Member, International Bar Association (IBA)
- Member, board of directors of Global Organisation of Parliamentarians Against Corruption (GOPAC).
- Chairman, Nigerian Chapter, African Parliamentarians Network Against Corruption.
- Member and leader of the Nigerian contingent to the Ecowas Parliament
- Member board of directors of Nigerian Association of Investment Promotion Agencies (NAIPA)

== Traditional titles ==
- Adigwe Ekpeye of Ekpeye land
- Ada – Idaha ke Efik Eburutu of Calabar
- Aha Eji Aga Mba of Okigwe
- Onwa Netiliora of Enugu State
- Agbawo Dike Izu of Egbema
- Ozulumba of Umunya
- Nta-Nta of Oron
- Ebubedike of Ogbunike
- Mataimakin Sarkin Talakawan Nijeriya

== Honours and awards ==
- Member of the Order of the Federal Republic (OFR)
- African International Worthy Ambassador (AIWA) – All African Students Union.
- Life Patron, National Union of Rivers States Students (NURSS).
- Hallmark Award for Distinguished Nigerians of the 21st Century.
- Award of exceptional performance in politics – Igbo National Council (INC) 2001
- Award of Excellence in Politics and Leadership Accomplishment
- Certificate of Membership 003309 – Nigerian Institute of Management (NIM)
- Award of Honorary Fellow of the Association – Nigeria Association of Technologists in Engineering (NATE)

== Publications ==
Nwuche has authored some academic works. These include:

- Larceny in English and Australian Law
- Restructuring the Oil Industry to allow for full participation by producing states and communities.
- Africa: The Process of Integration and Impact of Globalisation – (Presented as guest lecturer at Emancipation Day celebrations in Trinidad and Tobago, 1 August 2003, under the auspices of Caribbean Historical Society)
