= Chukwunweike Idigbe =

Nigerian jurist (1923–1983)

The Honorable Chukwunweike Idigbe

Justice Supreme Court of Nigeria
- In office April 10, 1964 – 1967
- Nominated by: Tafawa Balewa

Chief Justice Mid-Western region, Nigeria
- In office March 1966 – 1967
- Succeeded by: Ayo Irikefe

Justice Supreme Court of Nigeria
- In office 1975–1983
- Nominated by: Murtala Mohammed

Personal details
- Born: August 12, 1923 Kaduna, Nigeria
- Died: July 31, 1983 (aged 59)
- Spouse: Winifred Ogbolu-Idigbe
- Children: 6
- Education: King's College London

Chukwunweike Idigbe (1923–1983) was a justice of the Supreme Court of Nigeria, he was appointed to the position on April 10, 1964. He later served as Chief Justice of the Mid-Western region.

== Life ==
Idigbe was born to family of Ignatius and Christiana Idigbe in Kaduna, both parents were from Asaba Delta State and in 1977, Justice Idigbe was bestowed the traditional chieftaincy title of Izoma of Asaba. His father was a produce officer with a marketing board and later appointed as a member of the Western House of Chiefs representing Asaba under the Action Group.

Idigbe started education at Stella Maris College, Port Harcourt. In 1937, he attended Christ the King College, Onitsha and then proceeded to study law at King's College, Cambridge and Middle Temple (Inns Court of London) where he finished with a LL.B. Second Class Upper Division. He was called to the bar in 1947 and thereafter established a private law practice in Warri that covered the Western African Court of Appeal. On May 22, 1961, he was appointed a judge of the Western Nigeria High court. He was made a supreme Court Justice in 1964 and from 1966 to 1967, he served concurrently as the Chief Justice of the newly created Mid-Western region. However, in 1967, by virtue of his hometown, Idigbe was on the Biafran in the Nigerian Civil War and ceased to be a Nigerian judge. In 1972, he joined Irving and Bonnar, a private firm and three years later, he was re-appointed a judge in the Supreme Court. As a judge he was chairman of a land use committee set up to review the land tenure system in Nigeria.
