= Ghali Umar Na'Abba =

Nigerian politician (1958–2023)

Ghali Umar Na'Abba CFR
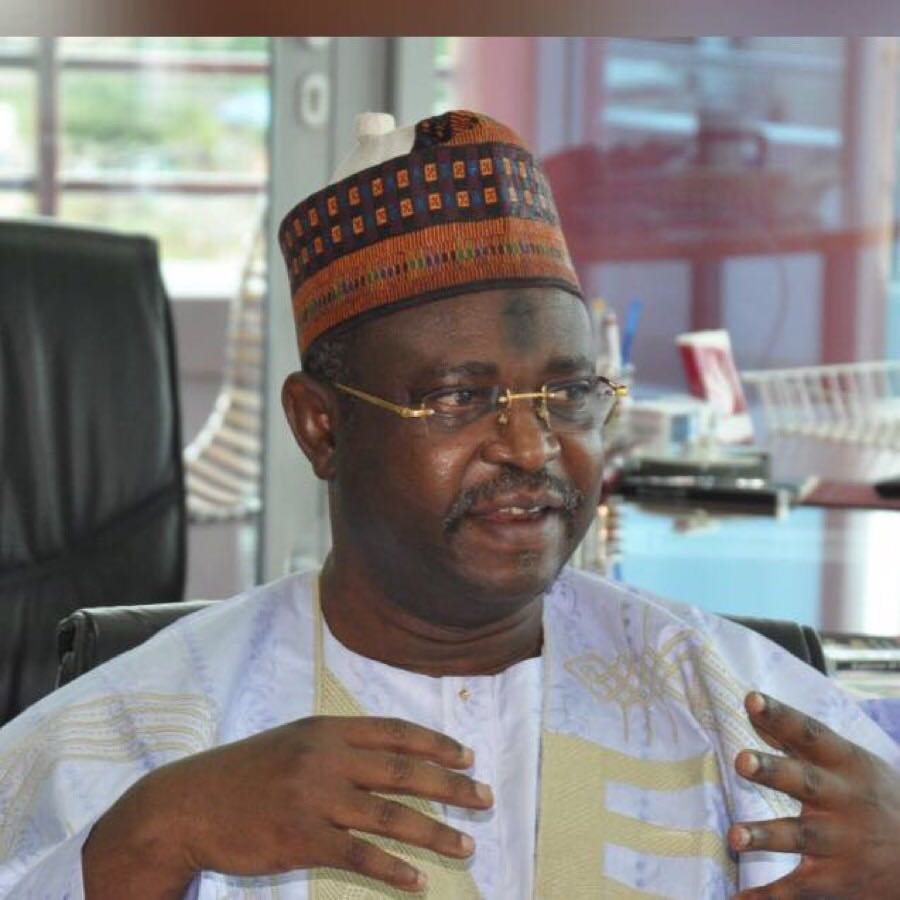

8th Speaker of the House of Representatives of Nigeria
- In office July 1999 – 3 June 2003
- Deputy: Chibudom Nwuche
- Preceded by: Salisu Buhari
- Succeeded by: Aminu Bello Masari

Personal details
- Born: 27 September 1958 Tudun Wada, Kano City, Northern Region, British Nigeria (now in Kano State, Nigeria).
- Died: 27 December 2023 (aged 65) Abuja, Nigeria
- Occupation: Politician
- Awards: Commander of the Order of the Federal Republic

Ghali Umar Na'Abba CFR (27 September 1958 – 27 December 2023) was a Nigerian politician who served as the 8th Speaker of the House of Representatives of Nigeria from 1999 to 2003.

== Background ==
Ghali Umar Na'Abba CFR was born into the family of Alhaji Umar Na'Abba, a businessman in Tudun Nufawa, Kano City, Kano Municipal Local Government on 27 September 1958. His father was a firm disciplinarian and an Islamic scholar. His father taught him the virtues of hard work, entrepreneurship, forthrightness, audacity, sincerity, dynamism, liberal disposition, prudence, modesty, and strong religious inclination.

== Education ==
In training, practice, and expertise, Na'Abba was a political scientist and a policy architect. He obtained a bachelor's degree in Political Science from the Ahmadu Bello University, Zaria in 1979. His early education was at Jakara Primary School, Kano, where he obtained his First School Leaving Certificate in 1969. He later attended Rumfa College, Kano, for his West African School Certificate and was also at the School of Preliminary Studies, Kano, between 1974 and 1976, before gaining admission into Ahmadu Bello University, Zaria, in October 1976.

Na'Abba completed a postgraduate programme on Leadership and Good Governance at the Kennedy School of Government, Harvard University in the United States in 2004. He served as Speaker of the House and led several international bodies in parliament in the wake of the millennium.

Na'Abba also attended, chaired, and presented papers at several international seminars, conferences on politics, parliament, development, and good governance. Among them were Conference of Presiding Officers of National Parliaments held in New York in 2000; West African Speakers Conferences held in 2000 and 2001 in Ouagadougou and Abuja respectively; Commonwealth Parliamentary Association annual conferences held variously in 1999, 2000, 2001 at Trinidad and Tobago, London and Melbourne, Australia and several others.

== Private sector experience ==
In 1980, after his university education and a one-year compulsory National Youth Service but before his branch into politics, Na'Abba joined his father's chain of companies. His business interests ranged from importation of goods to manufacturing to publishing. At first, he was a secretary in the Na'Abba Commercial Trading Company Limited, and later:

- Managing Director, Manifold Limited
- Director, Quick Prints Limited
- Managing Director, Hinterland Resources Limited

== Political ascendancy ==
As a Political Science student of Ahmadu Bello University, Zaria, he was elected as an executive committee member of the ABU chapter of the revolutionary People's Redemption Party established in the Second Republic by the maverick politician, Mallam Aminu Kano. As a student of Mallam Aminu school of good governance, nation building, and transparency in politics, he became a notable politician in Kano state and Nigeria in general.

Na'Abba joined the Peoples Democratic Party (PDP) in 1998 during its formative period. He emerged the party's candidate in April 1999 National Assembly election in Kano Municipal Federal Constituency of Kano state and won the election to represent the Federal constituency in the House of Representatives. With the victory and support of other House members-elect from Kano and the North West geopolitical zone, he pursued the role of Speaker of the House. Although he amassed substantial support from his colleagues and party leaders, he bowed to counsel and conceded to Ibrahim Salisu Buhari, who later emerged as the first Speaker of the Fourth Republic House of Representatives. He was thus appointed the House Committee Chairman on Appropriations.

Buhari's tenure was short-lived. Following his resignation due to certain misdemeanours, the House was thus faced with the arduous challenge of electing a leader who had the capacity and political will, and the skill of instilling sanity in the House, restoring its integrity, and designing and pursuing a veritable legislative framework. The mantle of leadership fittingly fell on Ghali Umar Na'Abba. The House collectively struck an unprecedented consensus and made Ghali the Speaker.

== Speaker of the House of Representatives ==
Na'Abba was often praised as an influential Speaker of the House. This is on account of his courage, dynamism, constructive outspokenness, resolute pursuit of legislative independence, and revolutionary approach towards the running of the House during his era as speaker. Upon election as speaker, Na'Abba made clear his broad roadmap. This included:

- Robust defence of the independence of the legislature
- Commitment to the concept of separation of powers
- Protection of the rule of law and the constitution of the Federal Republic of Nigeria
- Designing and actualization of an effective legislative framework
- Driving realistic legislative governance to resonate with good governance and quality national development
- Passage of good laws, resolutions, and policies to essentially provoke people-focused development
- Efficient management of public funds through a healthy budgetary regime that holds full budget implementation in high premium
- Pursuit of enhanced service delivery; curtailing of government waste and scaling down to the minimum, the rate of corruption in public places
- Holding the executive arm of government fully accountable to the people

To ensure a successful accomplishment of the above-mentioned goals, Na'Abba worked in close collaboration with other principal officers of the House, with Hon. Chibudom Nwuche as his Deputy, and embarked on the following measures:

- Putting in place critical pillars and mechanisms that resulted in the effective take-off of a parliament that was non-existent for 16 years following the military interregnum
- Designing a four-year revolutionary but realizable legislative agenda code-named House Contract with Nigeria. House Contract with Nigeria, which was launched by the Na'Abba-led House with fanfare and resolve, contained specific details of activities, programmes, and policies the House planned to embark on, to meet the basic needs of the people, improve public welfare, and sectoral development
- Developing Minimum Infrastructure Bills, a broad and integrated legislative master plan evolved to drive infrastructural development in Nigeria
- Shut doors to executive interference in parliamentary affairs
- Regular exposure of ills in government, in so doing, unflinchingly engaging Ministers and other heads of government agencies through investigative hearings and public hearings
- Profound scrutiny of the budgetary framework, making robust adjustments where necessary
- Forging effective and cordial relationships with the media and civil society groups to ensure the promotion of the young parliament
- Strengthening of House committees and emboldening of committee heads to take on Ministers and agency heads on policy issues and the level of budget implementation
- Regular interface with the Auditor-General and Accountant-General of the Federation and the Minister of Finance to scrutinize government books for immediate action
- Revitalization of plenary sessions, which threw up healthy, electrified, and animated debates with immense results. It is on record that Ghali's House plenary sessions remain the most vigorous and vibrant in this Fourth Republic and remarkable in the number of quality bills passed.
- Fashioning out a cohesive, inclusive, mutual, thinking, and participatory House, richly endowed with ideas. The matchlessness about Na'Abba and his House was the ability to mobilize more than two-thirds majority at any given time
- Mobilization of more than 300 members out of 360 to overturn President Obasanjo's veto on bills such as NDDC, etc., and so on. Na'Abba's House remains the only House that has been able to overturn a President's veto on a bill.
- Regular debate on the state of the nation. The 2002 debate resulted in the House's far-reaching resolution to commence impeachment proceedings against President Obasanjo to tame him over his growing appetite for constitutional breaches.
- Cataloguing of 32 impeachable offences of President Obasanjo. Na'Abba's House remains the only House that has so taken on the President in far-reaching fashion towards checkmating civilian dictatorship and gross constitutional breaches.

The executive arm of government, particularly the presidency, did not approve of his leadership. Consequently, the greater part of Na'Abba's tenure witnessed grand plots by the Presidency to oust him, to replace him with a compromising legislator. This severed the relationship between the House and the Presidency. He survived till the end of his four-year tenure on June 3, 2003. In August 2002, the House gave President Olusegun Obasanjo an ultimatum to either resign or face impeachment action.

As speaker, Na'Abba said the House would not withdraw the resolution. Na'Abba was the leader of the impeachment movement. It was reported that Obasanjo gave members of the House inducements to bring charges against Na'Abba.

== International parliamentary positions ==
Manifestly dynamic and proactive at home as a speaker, Na'Abba ensured that he replicated the same at the international level. This accounted for the numerous but particularly critical parliamentary positions he occupied at the international level during his four-year stint as speaker. A checklist includes:

- Vice President, Conference of Speakers of West African Parliaments
- Vice President, Global Parliamentarians on Habitat
- Vice President, African Region, Commonwealth Parliamentary Association
- Vice President, African Parliamentary Union
- President Conference of Speakers of West African Parliaments
- President, African Region, Commonwealth Parliamentary Association
- President, African Parliamentary Union
- President, African Regional Council, Global Forum for Parliamentarian on Habitat

Based on his leadership attributes, commitment to duty and performance and results, he was elevated from being the Vice President of the regional parliamentary bodies (Conference of Speakers of West African Parliaments; African Region, Commonwealth Parliamentary Association and Africa Parliamentary Union) to President in 2000 and 2001. These offered him the opportunity to significantly redefine, reshape, and drive African parliamentary diplomacy and development, fundamentally desired in the wake of the new millennium in 2000. As the President of the Commonwealth Parliamentary Association, Africa Region, he brought Nigeria back to the body with Nigeria's name being removed from abeyance as countries that are ruled by the military are put in abeyance by such bodies.

== 2003 Re-election bid ==
In April 2003, he sought a re-election into the House of Representatives on the platform of People's Democratic Party. The Presidency that brazenly lost the battle of removing him as Speaker extended the animosity to his re-election bid.

The Presidency feared that, given his level of performance in four years in the House and his high popularity rating, if he were allowed to win the election to return to the House, he would logically re-emerge Speaker. Essentially, this resulted in the regrettable conspiracy to have him lose the election. This time again, the backlash of the perfidy expanded and consumed PDP in the state as the party lost to All Nigeria People's Party.

== Political philosophy and re-alignment ==
Na'Abba's idea of a political party is one founded on:

- Justice, fairness, equity, providing for mass participation, and fundamentally operating on a liberal and collaborative platform.
- It also involves a platform that holds accountability and transparency in high regard, carrying all members along at all times.
- Boasting of manifestoes that are designed and implemented to meet the critical needs and aspirations of the people, thereby engendering good governance and national development.

Following the manipulations orchestrated by some of the party leaders which resulted in his loss of 2003 National Assembly election and perceived growing injustice in the party at that time which made the party to fall far short of his idea of a political party as enumerated above, Na'Abba decided to leave the party in protest with other like minds for Action Congress of Nigeria in 2006. When it became obvious that the key leaders who perpetuated the injustice had begun to give way, he returned to PDP, three years later.

As an affirmed progressive politician, the obvious derailment of PDP yet again in 2014, as evidenced in the mass exodus of leaders from the party, forced Na'Abba to leave the party after consultations. He joined the All Progressives Congress (APC), a coalition political platform for politicians of progressive bent desirous of positive change. Predictably, APC has succeeded in displacing PDP at the federal level and in several states.

== Death ==
Na'Abba died at the National Hospital in Abuja on 27 December 2023, at the age of 65.

== Awards ==
In recognition of his outstanding record in politics, pioneering parliamentary independence and development of the legislature and profound defence of democracy, rule of law, and the constitution, Na'Abba has bagged awards from the government, civil society groups, organized labour, students unions, private business organizations, political associations, and even foreign government agencies and so on. These are some of his awards:

- National Honours Award of Commander of the Order of the Federal Republic (CFR) awarded by Goodluck Jonathan, President of Nigeria, in 2010
- Award for building a formidable foundation for the legislative Arm of government, awarded by the People's Democratic Party(PDP), the ruling party at that time
- Honorary Citizen of Kansas City, Missouri, USA
- Man of Integrity Award by Students Union of University of Nigeria, Nsukka
- Award of Excellence for upholding the tenets of democracy in Nigeria by the Abuja Council of the Nigeria Union of Journalists (NUJ)
- Defender of democracy by Bayero University Students Union
- Appreciation and Commendation Award by the Nigeria Association of Indigenous Petroleum Exporters and Importers
- Certificate of honour by the Institute of Personnel Management of Nigeria
- Millennium Gold Award for youth development by the International Youth Congress
- Pillar of Nigeria's Legislative Award by Law Students Society, University of Jos
- Millennium Hero Award by All Northern Youths Forum
