= Baptist Boys' High School =

Secondary school in Nigeria

Coordinates: 9.57860°N 8.10346°E

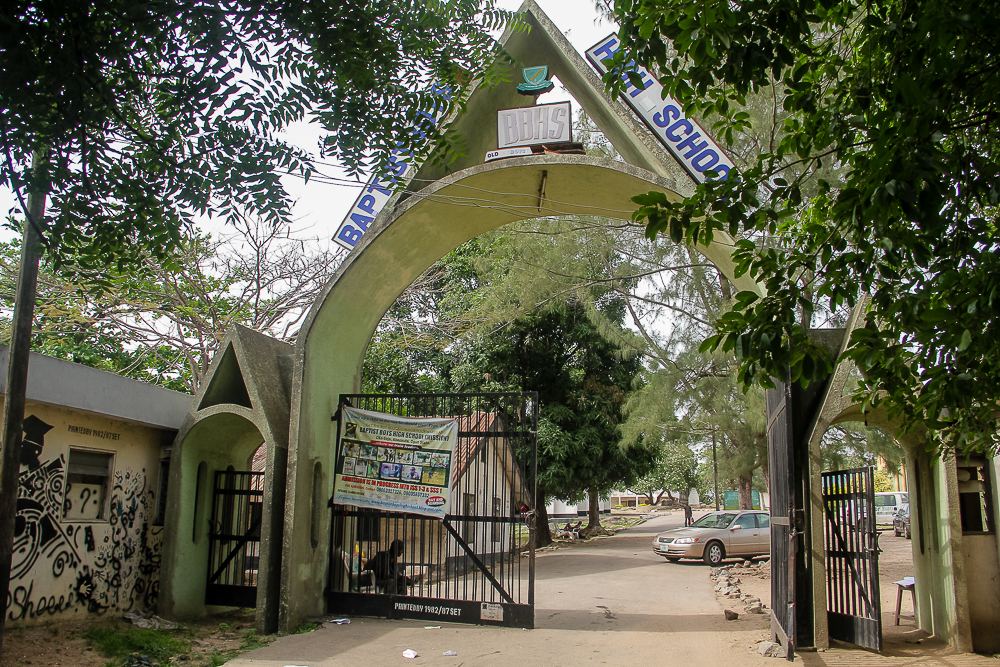
- Abeokuta, Ogun State, south-west Nigeria. Nigeria

Baptist Boys’ High School is a Baptist secondary school in Abeokuta, Ogun State, south-west Nigeria. It had a student body of 2,000 students as of the 2022–2023 academic year. The student population has decreased by almost half from the peak of 2155 in 1998–1999 academic year, partly in response to a concern about overcrowded facilities. BBHS is on its permanent site, Oke-Saje. It is affiliated with the Nigerian Baptist Convention.

== History ==
Baptist Boys’ High School was founded by the American International Mission Board, whose Foreign Mission Board started work in Abeokuta on August 5, 1850, with the arrival of the first missionary, Reverend Thomas Jefferson Bowen As well as preaching the gospel, the American Southern Baptist mission to Nigeria provided schools, hospitals, teacher training and theological colleges. The Nigerian Baptist Mission, an arm of its American counterpart, established three primary schools at Ago-Owu, Ago-Ijaye and Oke-saje.

After rapid growth of the Owu school to about 150 students, Reverend Samuel George Pinnock was directed by the Mission to set up a post primary school to educate children from the three feeder primary schools. In 1916 Pinnock identified and chose the site, Egunya Hill, and negotiated the purchase of the land. The building of the school was delayed because of the effect of World War I on the cost of building materials. However, in early 1922 Pinnock oversaw the construction of the Principal's Quarters, which also doubled as Abeokuta Mission House; a block of five classrooms, a chapel, and a dormitory for boys.

In 1922 Pinnock selected a group of advanced students from the three feeder primary schools at Ago-Owu, Ago-Ijaye and Oke-saje, and these formed the first class of the school. He opened Baptist Boys’ High School on January 23, 1923, with 75 students and four teachers (including his wife, Madora Pinnock). The opening ceremony attracted 2000 guests. The guest speaker was Professor Nathaniel Oyerinde, a teacher at the Baptist Academy, Ogbomoso, and Nigeria's first Baptist Professor.

Baptist Boys’ High School was set up as, and still remains, a boys-only school, although it became a mixed school very briefly in 1969 and 1970 following the introduction of the Higher School Certificate by the school board of governors. The school grew to 400 by December 1946, and to 1110 as of 2011–2012 academic year. The school library has a collection that has memoirs and stories written by students and teachers of the school between 1920s t0 1950s

The school remained at Egunya Hill until 1969, at which time it was moved to Oke-Saje. Boarding students are accommodated in hostels, but the number of boarding students has declined progressively over time – from 513 in 1998-1999 to 49 in 2022–2023 academic year.

== Organisation ==
- Schools: BBHS has two divisions, the Junior Secondary School and the Senior Secondary School, each of three-year duration.
- Houses: Students are grouped into four houses appropriately for ‘inter-house’ sports competitions. Bowen House is named after Reverend Thomas Jefferson Bowen, pioneer American Southern Baptist missionary to Nigeria. Pinnock House is named after the founding principal of BBHS, the Reverend Samuel Gorge Pinnock. Agboola House is named after the Reverend Emmanuel Oladele Agboola; he was the chairman of the board of governors of BBHS (1958-1971) and a Baptist preacher. Aloba House was named after a former BBHS teacher.
- As of 2023, the school has various facilities such as a 500 seater stadium, Basketball court, Lawn and Table Tennis court (junior and senior), Volleyball court, Boxing crest, OGD Hall and Alumni Hall, Vendors hall, OBA Car Park, Senate chamber staff room, USA & Canada OBA staff room, School Library with up-to-date technologies, MKO Science and Technology Laboratory Complex, Physics and Chemistry Laboratory, Biology Laboratory, Food and Nutrition Laboratory ( junior and senior), Basic Science and Technology Laboratory for junior school, Fine Art studio, Demeji Bankole ICT laboratory for senior school and Multichoice Computer Laboratory for junior school, AGORA Ground, Administrative block, OBA recreation centre, a satellite, Solar generated plants, a standby KVA generator and a WiFi, School clinic, School Hostel (with a chapel hall and a dining hall) for boarding students, A poultry farm and a modern Agricultural Laboratory, Staff quarters, Principals Lodge (Guests house) and many more.
- The schools' motto is Nulli Secundus in latin meaning second to none.

== Alumni Association ==
BBHS Old Boys Association has branches in the UK/Ireland, USA/Canada, Abeokuta, Ibadan, Ijebu Ode, Edo, Lagos and Abuja.

== Notable alumni ==
- Obafemi Awolowo
- Olusegun Obasanjo
- Bola Ajibola
- Gbenga Daniel
- Moshood Abiola
- Dimeji Bankole
- Adegboyega Dosunmu Amororo II
- Oyeleye Oyediran
- Olawale Adeniji Ige
- Kayode Soyinka
- Onaolapo Soleye former Federal Commissioner of Finance;
- Sunday Afolabi
- Adedotun Aremu Gbadebo III
- Alani Bankole
