= 2011 Nigerian House of Representatives elections in the Federal Capital Territory =

Federal Capital Territory elections, Nigeria

The 2011 Nigerian House of Representatives elections in Federal Capital Territory was held on 9 April 2011, to elect members of the House of Representatives to represent Federal Capital Territory, Nigeria.

== Overview ==
Affiliation	Party		Total
Affiliation	ANPP	PDP	Total
Before Election	1	1	2
After Election	-	2	2

== Summary ==
District	Incumbent	Party	Elected Senator	Party
Abaji/Gwagwalada/Kwali/Kuje	Isah Egah Dobi	PDP	Isah Egah Dobi	PDP
Amac/Bwari	Austen Peters-Pam Amanda Iyabode	ANPP	Zaphaniah Jisalo	PDP

== Results ==
=== Abaji/Gwagwalada/Kwali/Kuje ===
Party candidates registered with the Independent National Electoral Commission to contest in the election. PDP candidate Isah Egah Dobi won the election, defeating ANPP Aliyu Daniel Baka Kwali and other party candidates.

2011 Nigerian House of Representatives election in Federal Capital Territory
Party	Candidate	Votes	%
PDP	Isah Egah Dobi		
ANPP	Aliyu Daniel Baka Kwali		
Total votes			
PDP hold			

=== Amac/Bwari ===
Party candidates registered with the Independent National Electoral Commission to contest in the election. PDP candidate Zaphaniah Jisalo won the election, defeating CPC Yakubu M. Adamu and other party candidates.

2011 Nigerian House of Representatives election in Federal Capital Territory
Party	Candidate	Votes	%
PDP	Zaphaniah Jisalo		
CPC	Yakubu M. Adamu		
Total votes			
PDP hold			
