= Yohana Izam =

Nigerian Academian and Public Servant

Yohana Daniel Izam

The Vice Chancellor Plateau State University, Bokkos, Plateau State
- In office 2018–2023
- Preceded by: Doknan Sheni

Commissioner for Housing and Transport, Plateau State
- In office 2003–2007

Provost of the then College of Arts, Science and Remedial Studies, Plateau State
- In office 1999–2003

Personal details
- Born: 13 January 1967 (age 59) Sade, Plateau State, Nigeria
- Party: All progressive Congress (APC)
- Spouse: Yocy Izam
- Children: 3
- Education: University of Jos Lagos (BS); University of Lagos, Lagos (MS); University of Jos (PhD)

Yohana Daniel Izam is a Nigerian Academic, former Vice Chancellor of Plateau State University, and former President of the Nigerian Institute of Building. He was also a previously Commissioner for Housing and Transport in Plateau State, Nigeria.

== Background ==
Izam was born on 13 January, 1967 at Mangu local government area of Plateau State. He graduated from Federal Government College Wukari and proceeded to attend the University of Jos, graduating with his B.Sc. in Building in 1987. He also earned his M.Sc. from the University of Lagos in 1990 and returned to the University of Jos for his PhD in Construction Management, where he graduated in 2008.
