= Ayedaade/Isokan/Irewole =

Ayedaade/Isokan/Irewole Federal constituency is a National Assembly constituency in Osun State, Nigeria. .

As at 2020, there is one senator representing Ayedaade/Irewole/Isokan in the Senate (Upper House), in person of Hon Adelere Oriolowo. The Senate scrutinizes proposed laws and the budget of the country, and provide oversight of its other decision-making bodies. This senatorial seat was keenly contested in 2017 bye elections after the death late Senator Isiaka Adeleke. Senator Ademola Adeleke (brother of the deceased senator) defeated a former senator, Mudashiru Hussein of the APC, by a total of 97,480 votes to 66, 116 votes.

Also, one Representative represents Ayedaade/Irewole/Isokan in the Federal House of Representatives (Lower House), in person of Hon. Taiwo Olukemi Oluga. The House of Representatives is responsible for making laws in the country and for overall scrutiny of all aspects of government. Both representatives are from the All Progressives Congress, probably a trend that continued since former Hon. Patricia Etteh defected to the same party in 2018.

The elections in this constituency, like most Nigerian elections, are fraught with electoral malpractices. For example, the Guardian Newspaper reported that 2,411 voters engaged in multiple registrations. The investigators also found out that 2,402 voters registered twice while nine voters registered thrice. These fraudulent activities spanned nine local government areas including Atakunmosa West, Ayedaade, Ede North, Ilesa East, Ife North, Oriade, Ede South, Olorunda and Ife Central.

Allocations to Local Government Areas in Ayedaade/Isokan/Irewole Federal Constituencies

Sometimes the fierce political battles center around the Federal Government monthly allocations to these local governments. as shown in Table 1 below.

Table 1. Federal Allocations to the three Local Government Areas (LGAs) in Ayedaade/Isokan/Irewole Federal Constituency from 2019 to 2020.
Irewole LGA Allocations			Isokan LGA Allocations			Ayedaade LGA Allocations		
Year	Month	Net Allocation	Year	Month	Net Allocation	Year	Month	Net Allocation
2019	January	₦137,825,368.27	2019	January	₦124,908,269.49			
2019	February	₦140,992,383.11	2019	February	₦127,786,812.81			
2019	March	₦93,486,759.80	2019	March	₦84,854,739.76			
2019	April	₦88,137,593.31	2019	April	₦79,999,483.98			
2019	May	₦129,897,267.40	2019	May	₦117,715,331.54			
2019	June	₦145,369,766.97	2019	June	₦131,763,819.04			
2019	July	₦156,483,931.70	2019	July	₦141,848,762.70			
2019	August	₦148,671,701.57	2019	August	₦134,752,622.86			
2019	September	₦152,151,425.79	2019	September	₦137,938,821.94			
2019	October	₦146,155,773.39	2019	October	₦132,501,144.18			
2019	November	₦150,166,920.50	2019	November	₦136,153,978.50			
2019	December	₦137,094,125.04	2019	December	₦124,246,714.51			
2020	January	₦148,054,452.95	2020	January	₦134,198,294.80			
2020	February	₦136,819,021.77	2020	February	₦123,993,569.19	2020	February	₦140,354,919.27
2020	March	₦122,624,876.95	2020	March	₦111,139,070.71	2020	March	₦125,768,820.06
2020	April	₦139,398,070.48	2020	April	₦126,339,210.52	2020	April	₦142,944,665.42
2020	May	₦131,747,090.06	2020	May	₦119,636,076.48	2020	May	₦135,103,480.04
2020	June	₦119,151,580.52	2020	June	₦108,204,754.61	2020	June	₦122,112,526.96
2020	July	₦145,107,602.79	2020	July	₦131,783,681.26	2020	July	₦148,702,061.48
2020	August	₦149,319,210.26	2020	August	₦135,633,389.59	2020	August	₦153,010,140.53
