= Nigerian senators of the 7th National Assembly =

Senators of the 7th National Assembly of Nigeria

The table below lists elected Nigerian senators of the 7th National Assembly. The Senate includes three senators from each of the 36 states, plus one minister for the Federal Capital Territory, Abuja. The 7th National Assembly (2011 - 2015) was in May 2011.

== April 2011 elections ==
The elections were supervised by the Independent National Electoral Commission headed by Attahiru Jega, a respected academic and campaigner. Ballot papers were printed abroad to limit the supply of fraudulent papers, and various other measures were taken to reduce the potential for electoral fraud. The elections were originally scheduled for 2 April, but delayed until 9 April due to late arrival of ballot papers. In 15 constituencies, voting was further delayed until 26 April, the same date on which the elections for Governors and House of Assembly members was to be held. The voting was widely held to have been fair, in contrast to previous years. Results as of 21 April for 86 Senate seats showed the People's Democratic Party (PDP) leading with 55 seats, the Action Congress of Nigeria (ACN) with 13 seats and the All Nigerian Peoples Party (ANPP) with 7 seats.

The constituencies with delayed elections were Bayelsa Central, Benue North, Cross River Central and South, Ebonyi North, Ekiti (all seats), Gombe North, Kaduna North, Niger South, Plateau (all seats), Sokoto North. In addition to the fifteen delays announced at first, elections were also delayed in Akwa Ibom Northeast because of the omission of the Labour Party (LP) logo from the ballot papers. The Bauchi South elections were postponed because the ballot papers had been coded wrongly. In Bayelsa West, Heineken Lokpobiri was first declared winner, then on 11 April the INEC cancelled that result stating there were widespread irregularities. Lokpobiri was arrested by State Security Service operatives soon after the announcement. The Niger East election was inconclusive, and was suspended after a bomb exploded in Suleja.

== See also ==
- National Assembly (Nigeria)
- Nigerian Senate
