= Isyaku Ibrahim =

Nigerian politician (1936 or 1937 – 2025)

Isyaku Ibrahim (also spelled Isiaku) (1936 or 1937 – 16 August 2025) was a Nigerian politician and businessman based in Kano. He was a member of the Board of Trustees of the ruling People's Democratic Party (PDP) and was President of the Nigeria Universities Games Association (NUGA).

== Life and career ==
Ibrahim was a member of Nigeria's parliament in the early 1960s, before the nation's first military coup.

Ibrahim was a founding member of the PDP, and remains on its Board of Trustees. He initially backed Alex Ekwueme for the PDP presidential nomination in the 1999 elections, but Ekweume lost out to Olusegun Obasanjo. Ibrahim switched to supporting Obasanjo, who won the nomination and election. However, he has since criticized Obasanjo for showing "no respect for the rule of law", and said that although Umaru Yar'Adua has taken over as President, Obasanjo is still "the de facto ruler of Nigeria".

He also criticized the former Speaker of the House of Representatives, fellow PDP member Patricia Etteh, diverging from his party's official policy of supporting her amidst corruption allegations.

Ibrahim died in Abuja on 16 August 2025, at the age of 88.
