= Stella Maris College, Port Harcourt =

Stella Maris College

Location
- 34 Harbour Road; Port Harcourt, Rivers State; Nigeria

Information
- Type: Private, all-boys
- Motto: Semper et ubique fidelis ("Always and everywhere faithful")
- Religious affiliation: Roman Catholic
- Established: 1948
- School district: Diocese of Port Harcourt
- Principal: Anthony Bakel
- Gender: Male
- Colours: Blue and White
- Website: http://stellamariscollegephc.com

Stella Maris College is an all-boy catholic high school in Port Harcourt, the capital of Rivers State, Nigeria. The school is located in the Roman Catholic Diocese of Port Harcourt. Established in 1948, the school serves both as a day school and a boarding school. It is headed and run mainly by the Holy Ghost Reverend Fathers.

== History ==
Initially, the school was located at the site of the St. Mary’s Catholic Church in Aggrey Road. However, in October 1948, it moved to its present site at 34 Harbour Road in the Old Port Harcourt Township.

Former First Lady of Nigeria, Patience Jonathan began her teaching career at the Stella Maris College.

== Notable alumni ==
- Chukwunweike Idigbe - lawyer
- Chibudom Nwuche - politician

== See also ==
- List of schools in Port Harcourt
- Roman Catholic Diocese of Port Harcourt
