= Ahizechukwu Eke =

Nigerian-American scientist (born 1978)

Ahizechukwu Eke, MD PhD MPH
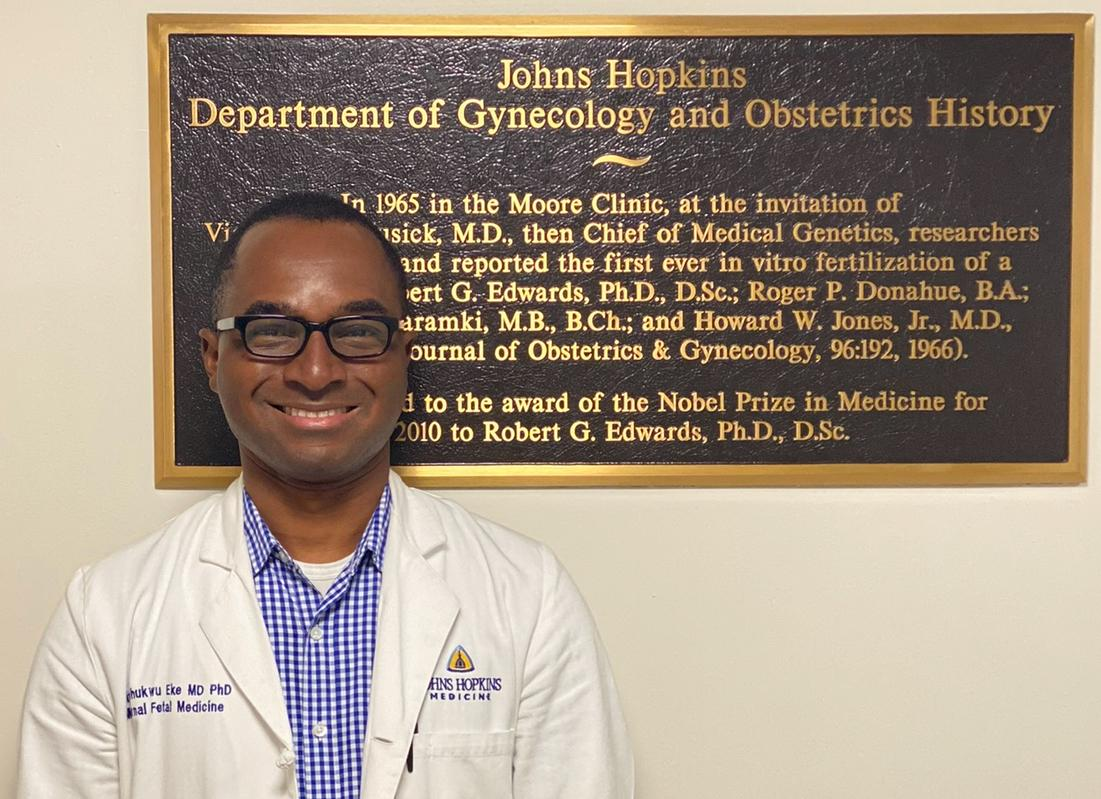
- Dr. Ahizechukwu Eke in 2025
- Born: May 11, 1978 (age 48) [UNTH Enugu], Nigeria
- Education: Federal Government College, Wukari; University of Calabar; Harvard University; Johns Hopkins University
- Occupations: Maternal-fetal medicine Obstetrician & Gynecologist; Clinical Pharmacologist; Physician-scientist
- Employer: Johns Hopkins University
- Title: Associate Professor of Obstetrics and Gynecology & Maternal-fetal medicine
- Awards: American College of Obstetricians and Gynecologists (ACOG) Donald Richardson's Paper Prize (2016); Cochrane (organisation) Kenneth Warren Prize (2017); Society for Reproductive Investigation (SRI) Pfizer Presidential Award (2019); Distinguished Teaching Society (DTS) of the Johns Hopkins University School of Medicine (2020); Alpha Omega Alpha (2014); Delta Omega Honor Society (2021); National Institutes of Health Director's Pioneer Award (2024)

Ahizechukwu Chigoziem Eke is a Nigerian-American physician-scientist, obstetrician-gynecologist, and specialist in maternal-fetal medicine. He is a 2024 recipient of the NIH Director's Pioneer Award, and has led influential pharmacologic research in pregnant women. He is an Associate Professor in the Division of maternal-fetal medicine at the Johns Hopkins University School of Medicine, where he directs the integrated maternal-fetal medicine research program. Eke is internationally recognized for his research in pharmacology in pregnancy and lactation, with contributions spanning clinical pharmacology, infectious diseases in pregnancy, translational science, and implementation research.

== Early life and education ==
Eke was born at the University of Nigeria Teaching Hospital in Enugu State, Nigeria. He attended Federal Government College, Wukari in Taraba State, before completing his medical degree (MBChB) at the University of Calabar. He earned a Master of Public Health (MPH) from the Harvard School of Public Health, concentrating in health policy and management.

He completed residency training in Obstetrics and Gynecology in Nigeria at the Nnamdi Azikiwe University Teaching Hospital, and later at Michigan State University Obstetrics and Gynecology residency training program (now University of Michigan Health - Sparrow) in the United States. He went on to complete dual fellowships in maternal-fetal medicine and clinical pharmacology at Johns Hopkins University, where he earned a doctor of philosophy (PhD) in clinical investigation through the Graduate Training Program in Clinical Investigation at the Johns Hopkins Bloomberg School of Public Health.

== Career ==
Eke's clinical and research career focuses on the intersection of maternal fetal medicine and pharmacologic research. He serves as the protocol chair for the International Maternal Pediatric Adolescent AIDS Clinical Trials Group (IMPAACT) 2041, a phase I/II clinical trial evaluating the pharmacokinetics and safety of glecaprevir/pibrentasvir initiated during pregnancy among women with hepatitis C, including women co-infected with HIV. He is also involved in longitudinal cohort studies examining cardiovascular and metabolic outcomes in pregnant and postpartum women.

His global health work includes contributions to Supporting, Mobilizing, and Accelerating Research for Tuberculosis Elimination (SMART4TB), a tuberculosis research initiative that integrates detection, prevention, and treatment strategies to reduce the burden of TB in high-risk settings. His broader research interests include optimizing drug safety and dosing in pregnancy and lactation, particularly in contexts such as preterm birth, HIV, tuberculosis, sickle cell disease, hypertensive disorders of pregnancy, and opioid use in pregnancy.

== Research and academic contributions ==
Eke's research focuses on optimizing the safe and effective use of medications in pregnancy and lactation. His work spans pharmacokinetics, pharmacodynamics, pharmacoepidemiology, pharmacogenomics, and pharmacometrics. He has led clinical and translational research on drug safety, dosing, and interactions in pregnant women, particularly in relation to preterm birth, HIV, hepatitis C, tuberculosis, sickle cell disease, hypertensive disorders of pregnancy, and substance use disorders.

His studies integrate approaches such as longitudinal cohort designs, intensive and sparse pharmacokinetic sampling, population-based modeling, physiologically based pharmacokinetic modelling, and real-world data analysis. He has pioneered the use of high-dimensional omics such as proteomics and metabolomics in investigating the pathophysiology of complex pregnancy-related conditions. This work contributes to the development of personalized pharmacotherapy strategies and regulatory guidance for medication use during pregnancy.

Eke has received multiple research grants from the NIH, including a Women's Reproductive Health Research (WRHR) Career Development award, a K23 Career Development award, and a National Institutes of Health Director's Pioneer Award (DP1), which supports innovative and high-impact research.

== Editorial and advisory roles ==
Eke serves on the editorial boards of several peer-reviewed journals. He is a member of the editorial board of NEJM Evidence, a journal published by the New England Journal of Medicine, as well as Frontiers in Global Women's Health (Infectious Diseases in Women), and the Journal of Maternal Health, Neonatology and Perinatology.

He has also contributed to global health policy and ethics initiatives. Eke serves as a member of the World Health Organization (WHO) HIV, Hepatitis, and Sexually Transmitted Infections (STIs) Pregnancy and Breastfeeding Therapeutics Working Group (HHS PTWG), and has participated in working groups and committees convened by the National Academies of Sciences, Engineering, and Medicine focused on improving the inclusion of pregnant and lactating women in clinical research. His work has helped shape guidelines related to maternal pharmacology and public health policy.

== Publications ==
Eke has authored or co-authored over 200 peer-reviewed publications in leading journals, including The New England Journal of Medicine, Journal of the American Medical Association (JAMA), The Lancet, Clinical Infectious Diseases (CID), Clinical Pharmacology and Therapeutics, CPT Pharmacometrics and Systems Pharmacology, and the British Journal of Obstetrics and Gynecology. His published work has garnered over 7,800 citations, and spans topics such as perinatal pharmacology, maternal co-morbidities, and global health.

In addition to original research, he has contributed expert commentaries and reviews, particularly in the fields of pharmacologic safety in pregnancy and maternal HIV care. His work is frequently cited in policy documents by organizations such as the American College of Obstetricians and Gynecologists (ACOG), the National Institute of Child Health and Human Development (NICHD), and the U.S. Food and Drug Administration (FDA).

== Awards and recognition ==
Eke has received several awards for his contributions to medicine and public health. These include the Donald F. Richardson Memorial Research Award from ACOG, the Kenneth Warren Prize from the Cochrane Collaboration, and the Young Physician-Scientist Award from the American Society for Clinical Investigation (ASCI). He is a member of both the Alpha Omega Alpha Honor Medical Society and the Delta Omega Honorary Society in Public Health.

In 2024, he was recognized by the NIH Common Fund as a recipient of the Director's Pioneer Award, one of the agency's most competitive and prestigious awards for high-risk, high-reward research. In 2025, Eke was recognized as one of the top 1% of Gynecologic Surgery Research All-Stars.

Eke's research and expert opinion have been featured in a range of media outlets, including STAT News, MedPage Today, Medscape, HuffPost, and Runner's World.
