= Federal Government College, Wukari =

Federal Government College

Location
- Wukari along Jalingo road Wukari, Taraba State, Nigeria
- Coordinates: 7.875685°N 9.787604°E

Information
- Type: Secondary school
- Established: October 1978
- Founders: Federal Government of Nigeria
- Nickname: FGC Wukari
- Website: fgcwukari.centralbillingfuc.com

Federal Government College, Wukari is a high coeducational school for both mixed genders. It is located at Wukari Taraba, Nigeria.

It was established along with 109 federal own secondary school as one among the unity schools in various states of the federation. The school was open in October 1978 at Wukari, Zaki Bam, a temporary place before locating to the main site in 1980.

The first Principal was Mr. S.N. Abia.

== Notable alumni ==
Among the notable alumni of Federal Government College, Wukari are:

- Dr. Ahizechukwu Eke, Nigerian-American, Associate Professor of Maternal-Medicine & Gynecology & Obstetrics, Johns Hopkins University School of Medicine
- Yohana Izam – Nigerian academic and public servant; served as Vice Chancellor of Plateau State University (2018–2023) and Commissioner for Housing & Transport in Plateau State
- Babangida Nguroje – Politician; former Federal House of Representatives member for Sardauna/Gashaka/Kurmi (2003–2011), and National Coordinator of the APC Ex-Legislators Forum
