= Edwin Ume-Ezeoke =

Nigerian lawyer and politician (1935–2011)

Edwin Ume-Ezeoke CFR

Speaker of the House of Representatives of Nigeria
- In office 1 October 1979 – 1 October 1983
- Preceded by: Ibrahim Jalo Waziri (1966)
- Succeeded by: Chaha Biam

Personal details
- Born: 8 September 1935 Amichi, Southern Region, British Nigeria (now Amichi, Nnewi South, Anambra State, Nigeria)
- Died: 1 August 2011 (aged 75) Fortis Super Specialty Hospital, New Delhi, India
- Spouse: Ngozi
- Children: 6 children
- Education: St. Patrick's College Calabar; North-Western Polytechnic; Council of Legal Education; Holborn College; Nigerian Law School
- Occupation: Lawyer and Politician
- Profession: Lawyer
- Awards: CFR

Edwin Ume-Ezeoke // CFR (8 September 1935 – 1 August 2011) was a Nigerian politician and lawyer by profession. He served as the first Speaker of the House of Representatives during the Second Nigerian Republic (1979-1983). He was also national chairman of the All Nigeria Peoples Party.

== Early life and education ==
Edwin Ume-Ezeoke was the ninth son of his father's fourteen sons and was born at Obiagu village, Amichi to Igwe Umeorimili Orji Ezeoke and Lolo Ugbana Umeorimili Ezeoke (later baptized and renamed Elizabeth). His father became a warrant chief in 1914 and held that position until his death on 23 June 1952. His mother was the daughter of Igwe Dim Oriaku Udensi of the present day Ihitenansa in present-day Imo State.

His Father being the President of the Customary Court by virtue of his position as the traditional ruler of the town, traveled a lot and always took his son Edwin with him. It was during these trips to the Customary Court combined with his occasional presence at the settlement of inter-village disputes that his interest in the study of Law was born.

Young Edwin's education commenced at St. Eugenia's Catholic Primary School, Obiagu Village, Amichi in 1943. Displaying early signs of leadership abilities, he was made the class monitor and was saddled with the responsibility of being the school regulator/bell ringer. He captained the school football team and participated actively in athletics, winning a number of prizes during the Empire Games held annually at Nnewi during the British Colonial rule. He passed out in 1951 with the First School Leaving Certificate.

Edwin Ume-Ezeoke passed the entrance examination into the prestigious St. Patrick's College, Calabar in 1952 and was admitted into the college by the then principal, Rev. Fr. Keans. The college exposed him and enabled him to interact with other students of different ethnic groups. It was not long before his leadership qualities were once again detected and recognized. He became dormitory prefect and college Athletics Captain and led his team to victory in 1955 during the Calabar Provincial Winston Parnaby Athletics competition for colleges in Calabar.

He passed out from St. Patrick's College in 1956 and obtained his West African School Certificate. Because it usually took a year for the results to be made public, he applied and was employed as a teacher at St. Michael's Catholic School, Ezinifite, Nnewi South L.G.A. of Anambra State.

Edwin resigned his teaching appointment and proceeded to Port Harcourt in 1958 where he secured appointment in the Department of Customs and Excise. The nature of his work was to collect revenue such as taxes and government duties on goods imported into Nigeria. While working in Customs he furthered his education through a private institution and obtained Advanced level Pass in History. He resigned his appointment with Customs and Excise Department and his quest for further knowledge took him to England in 1960 financially supported by his older brother, Geoffrey.

In London, Edwin Ume-Ezeoke initially attended the North-Western Polytechnic from 1960 to 1962. He then acquired the G.C.E. Advanced Level in Economics, History and British Constitution. With his advanced Level, he was admitted in the Inns of Court Middle Temple to study law.. He proceeded to Holburn College of Law, University of London and finished successfully in 1966 with an award of LLB (Hons) and returned to Nigeria. Thereafter he was called to the Bar.

Ume-Ezeoke died on 1 August 2011.
