= Benjamin Chaha =

Nigerian politician (1940–2022)

Chaha Biam

Speaker of the House of Representatives of Nigeria
- In office 1 October 1983 – 31 December 1983
- Preceded by: Edwin Ume-Ezeoke
- Succeeded by: Agunwa Anaekwe (1992)

Personal details
- Born: 1940
- Died: 9 March 2022 (aged 81–82)
- Occupation: Politician

Benjamin Chaha (1940 – 9 March 2022) was a Nigerian politician who was the second Speaker of the House of Representatives of Nigeria in the Second Nigerian Republic, from October 1983 to December 1983.

Chaha was born in Nigeria in 1940. He died on 9 March 2022, at the age of 82.
