= Salisu Buhari =

Nigerian politician

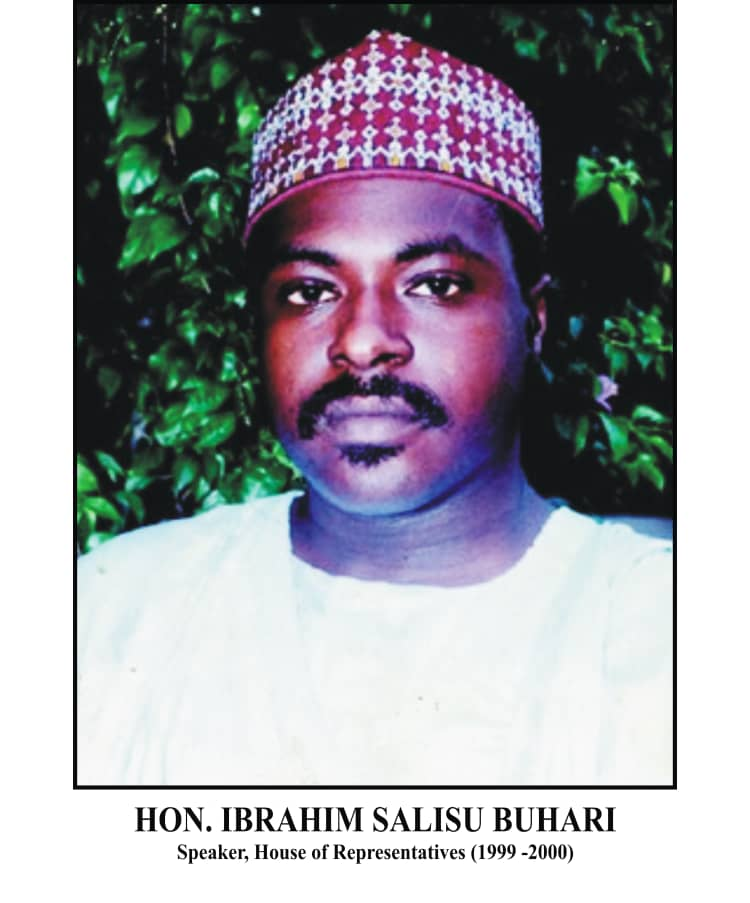

7th Speaker of the House of Representatives of Nigeria
- In office 3 June 1999 – 23 July 1999
- Preceded by: Agunwa Anaekwe (1993)
- Succeeded by: Ghali Umar Na'Abba

Personal details
- Born: 3 January 1970 (age 56)
- Occupation: Politician

Salisu Buhari (born 3 January 1970) is a former Speaker of the House of Representatives of Nigeria. In 1999, he resigned from office over allegations of certificate forgery. He was later convicted of certificate forgery and sentenced to two years in prison with an option of a fine. He paid the fine and was later pardoned by President Olusegun Obasanjo.

== Political career ==
Buhari had been a businessman before entering politics. In 1999, Buhari was appointed the Speaker of the House of Representatives, the fourth-highest office in Nigeria. However, this only lasted for six weeks before the University of Toronto scandal broke, ultimately leading to his resignation and prosecution.

In 2013, he was chosen as part of the governing council of the University of Nigeria by the Nigerian government.

== Controversies ==
The news of Buhari's age and certificate forgery first broke out on 16 February 1999 by an investigative news publication, TheNews magazine. Their investigation concluded that Buhari was born in 1970, not 1963 as he claimed, and also that he never graduated from the University of Toronto. The article claimed that Buhari not only never graduated, but never even attended the university. Claims about Buhari's age were especially relevant to his position as Speaker of the House, since section 65(1) of the Constitution of Nigeria disqualified anyone below the age of 30 from running for election to the House.

Buhari had also claimed that he completed his National Youth Service at Standard Construction in Kano. This also proved untrue, as no record could be found of his completing the program. When Buhari was confronted with multiple allegations of fraud, he denied them as attacks on him and threatened to file a libel lawsuit against the publisher. He asserted that the allegations were a witch-hunt. The magazine, however, wrote to the University of Toronto, requesting confirmation that Buhari was an alumnus, who denied having any record of his attendance.

On 23 July 1999, disgraced and cornered, Buhari admitted to falsifying his age and forging certificates as well as other allegations from the TheNews report, saying in a statement:

I apologize to you. I apologize to the nation. I apologize to my family and friends for all the distress I have caused them. I was misled in error by a zeal to serve the nation, I hope the nation will forgive me and give me the opportunity to serve again.

He then resigned from House of Representatives.
