= Deputy Speaker of the House of Representatives of Nigeria =

Second highest-ranking official of the House of Representatives of Nigeria

Deputy Speaker of the House of Representatives of the Federal Republic of Nigeria
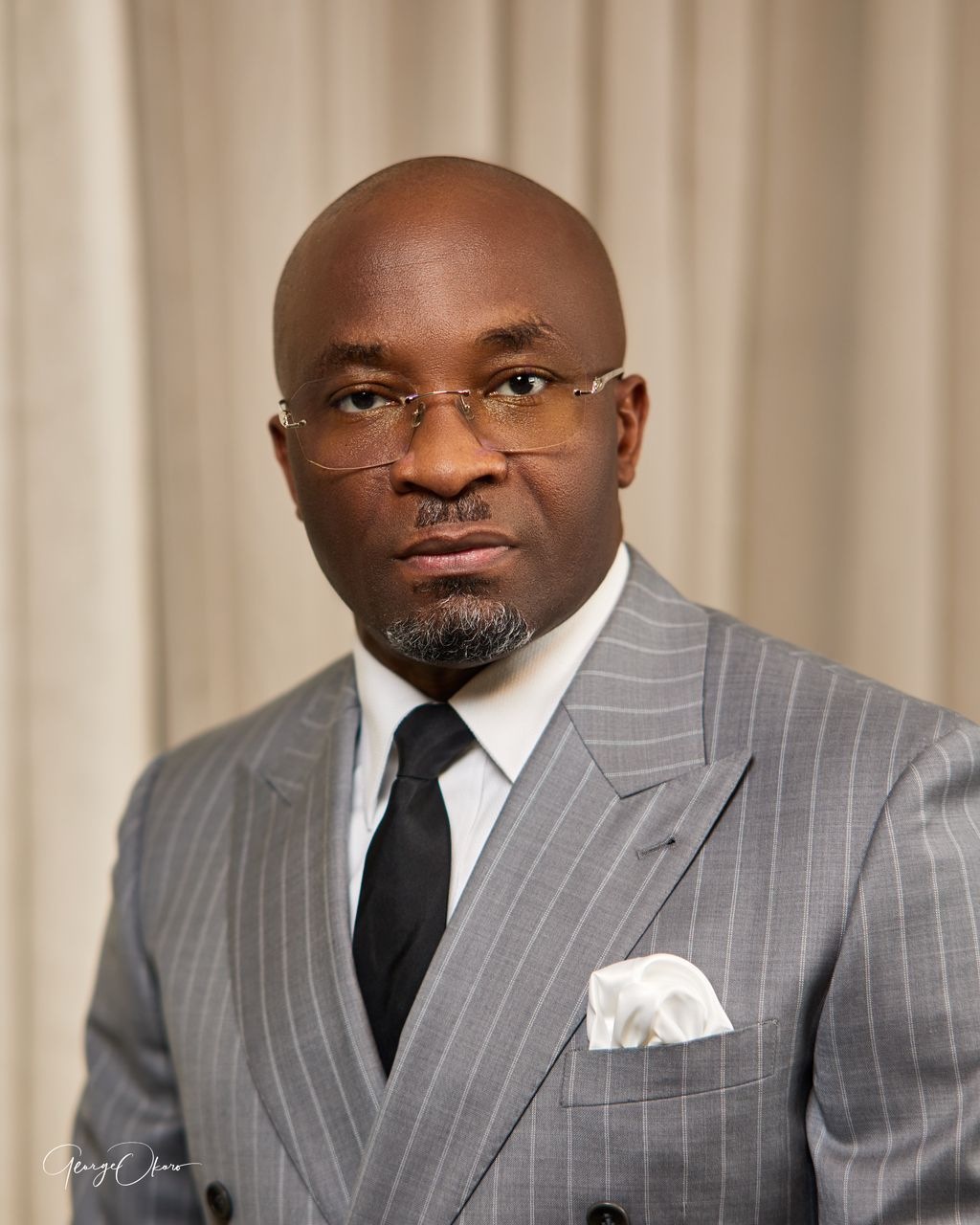
- Incumbent; Benjamin Kalu since 13 June 2023
- Legislative Branch of the Federal Government
- Style: Mr Deputy Speaker (informal); The Honourable (formal)
- Member of: Nigerian House of Representatives; National Assembly Commission
- Seat: National Assembly Complex, Three Arms Zone, Abuja
- Appointer: Indirect House Election
- Term length: 4 years renewable
- Constituting instrument: Constitution of Nigeria
- Inaugural holder: Chibudom Nwuche (Fourth Republic)
- Formation: 3 June 1999; 27 years ago (Fourth Republic)

The Deputy Speaker of the House of Representatives is the second highest-ranking member of the Federal House of Representatives of Nigeria after the speaker. The current deputy speaker is Benjamin Kalu who was elected on 13 June 2023. The deputy speaker presides over the House in the absence of the speaker. The deputy speaker is elected by a majority of the members of the House of Representatives.

== List of deputy speakers ==
Image	Name	Term	Party
	Benjamin Uzoukwu Nzeribe	1 October 1960 – 15 January 1966	NCNC
	Idris Ibrahim Kuta	1 October 1979 – 31 December 1983	NPN
	Rabiu Kwankwaso	5 December 1992 – 17 November 1993	SDP
	Chibudom Nwuche	3 June 1999 – 3 June 2003	PDP
	Austin Adiele Opara	3 June 2003- 3 June, 2007	PDP
	Babangida S. M. Nguroje	3 June 2007 – 30 October 2007	PDP
	Usman Bayero Nafada	2 November 2007 – 6 June 2011	PDP
	Chukwuemeka Ihedioha	6 June 2011 – 6 June 2015	PDP
	Yusuf Sulaimon Lasun	9 June 2015 – 9 June 2019	APC
	Ahmed Idris Wase	11 June 2019 – 11 June 2023	APC
	Benjamin Kalu	13 June 2023 – present	APC
