= 2011 Nigerian House of Representatives elections in Bayelsa State =

The 2011 Nigerian House of Representatives elections in Bayelsa State was held on April 9, 2011, to elect members of the House of Representatives to represent Bayelsa State, Nigeria.

== Overview ==
Affiliation	Party		Total
Affiliation	ACN	PDP	Total
Before Election	-	5	5
After Election	-	5	5

== Summary ==
District	Incumbent	Party	Elected Reps Member	Party
Brass/Nembe	Nelson Belief	PDP	Jephthah Foingha	PDP
Ogbia	Clever Ikisikpo	PDP	Karibo Nadu S	PDP
Sagbama/Ekeremor	Henry Seriake Dickson	PDP	Henry Seriake Dickson	PDP
Southern Ijaw	Egberibin Donald Jacob	PDP	Henry Aladeinyefa Daniel-Ofongo	PDP
Yenagoa/Kolokuna/Opokuma	Warman Weri Ogoriba	PDP	Warman Weri Ogoriba	PDP

== Results ==
=== Brass/Nembe ===
PDP candidate Jephthah Foingha won the election, defeating other party candidates.

2011 Nigerian House of Representatives election in Bayelsa State
Party	Candidate	Votes	%
PDP	Jephthah Foingha		
PDP hold			

=== Ogbia ===
PDP candidate Karibo Nadu S won the election, defeating other party candidates.

2011 Nigerian House of Representatives election in Bayelsa State
Party	Candidate	Votes	%
PDP	Karibo Nadu S		
PDP hold			

=== Sagbama/Ekeremor ===
PDP candidate Henry Seriake Dickson won the election, defeating other party candidates.

2011 Nigerian House of Representatives election in Bayelsa State
Party	Candidate	Votes	%
PDP	Henry Seriake Dickson		
PDP hold			

=== Southern Ijaw ===
PDP candidate Henry Aladeinyefa Daniel-Ofongo won the election, defeating other party candidates.

2011 Nigerian House of Representatives election in Bayelsa State
Party	Candidate	Votes	%
PDP	Henry Aladeinyefa Daniel-Ofongo		
PDP hold			

=== Yenagoa/Kolokuna/Opokuma ===
PDP candidate Warman Weri Ogoriba won the election, defeating other party candidates.

2011 Nigerian House of Representatives election in Bayelsa State
Party	Candidate	Votes	%
PDP	Warman Weri Ogoriba		
PDP hold			
