= Patricia Etteh =

Nigerian politician and lawyer (born 1953)

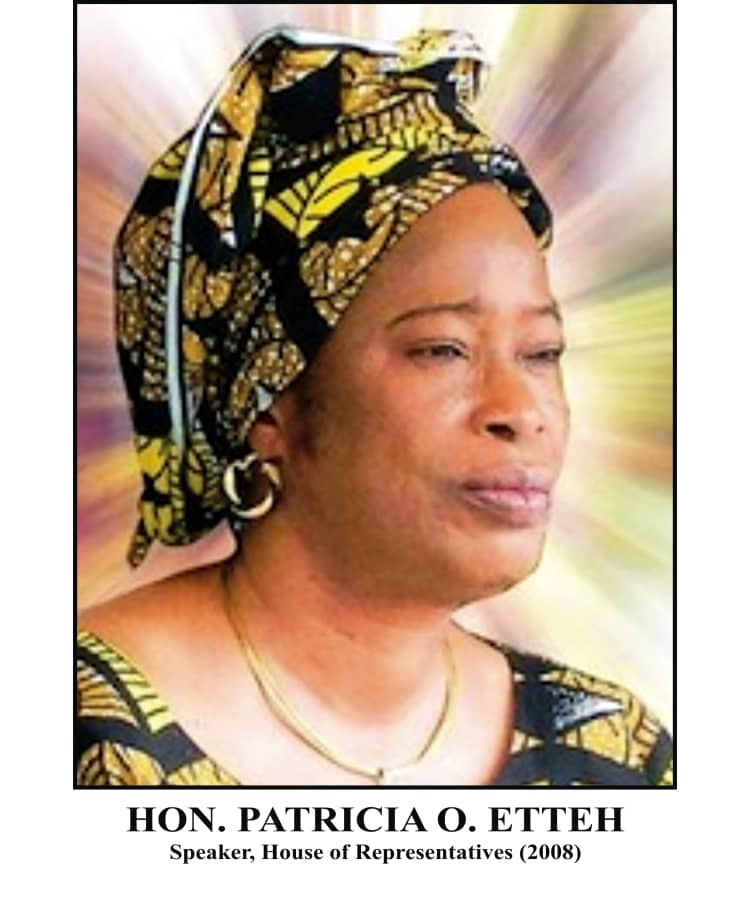
- Patricia O. Etteh in 2008

10th Speaker of the House of Representatives of Nigeria
- In office 6 June 2007 – 30 October 2007
- Deputy: Babangida Nguroje
- Preceded by: Aminu Bello Masari
- Succeeded by: Dimeji Bankole

Member of the House of Representatives of Nigeria from Osun
- In office 3 June 1999 – 6 June 2011
- Constituency: Ayedaade/Isokan/Irewole

Personal details
- Born: 17 August 1953 (age 72)
- Party: Peoples Democratic Party
- Other political affiliations: Alliance for Democracy (1999–2002)
- Children: 2
- Education: University of Buckingham
- Profession: Politician; lawyer; beauty therapist

Patricia Olubunmi Foluke Etteh (born 17 August 1953) is a Nigerian lawyer and politician who served as the 10th speaker of the House of Representatives of Nigeria from June to October 2007.

== Personal life and education ==
Patricia Olubunmi Foluke Etteh, a Yoruba, was born on 17 August 1953 in Ikire, Irewole Local Government Area Osun State. She was trained as a hairdresser and beauty therapist, but she also earned a law degree from the University of Buckingham in the United Kingdom and was called to the Nigerian Bar in 2016.

== Political career ==
Etteh represented the Ayedaade/Isokan/Irewole constituency in Osun State. She was initially elected in 1999 as an Alliance for Democracy (AD) member, but she switched to the Peoples Democratic Party (PDP), when running for re-election in 2003. She was elected to the position of speaker unanimously in June 2007, and she has been the only woman to have held this position in the Nigerian government.

Patricia Olubunmi stands as both a symbol of progress and case study in political vulnerability in Nigeria.

== Corruption scandal ==
In September 2007, she faced a committee of MPs over accusations that she had authorised the spending of 628 million Naira (about US$5 million) on renovations of her official residence and that of her deputy, and the purchase of 12 official cars meant for the House of Representatives. Accusations of theft were chanted at her as she tried to speak in the House, and she was escorted out by the security men as the situation degenerated into a commotion.

The PDP officially continued to back Etteh, although some members, such as Isyaku Ibrahim, criticised this stance. Author and academic, Wole Soyinka, was among those, who called for her resignation, while the former president and PDP member, Olusegun Obasanjo, continued to support her. On 30 October, following weeks of pressure, Etteh resigned her position as speaker. Her deputy, Babangida Nguroje, also resigned. However at the last seating of the 6th session House of Representatives, it was agreed that "There is no record or proceedings of the House, where Patricia Olubunmi Etteh was ever indicted."

== Personal life ==
Etteh is married to engineer Etteh, an Akwa Ibom man. The couple has two children.
