= 2011 Nigerian House of Representatives elections in Taraba State =

The 2011 Nigerian House of Representatives elections in Taraba State was held on April 9, 2011, to elect members of the House of Representatives to represent Taraba State, Nigeria.

== Overview ==
Affiliation	Party		Total
Affiliation	LP	PDP	Total
Before Election	-	6	6
After Election	1	5	6

== Summary ==
District	Incumbent	Party	Elected Reps Member	Party
Bali/Gassol	Kabir Abdullahi Jalo	PDP	Haruna Manu	PDP
Jalingo/Yorro/Zing	Henry Mashogwawara Shawulu	PDP	Ibrahim Yakubu Saleh	LP
Karim Lamido/Lau/Ardo-Kola	Jerimon S Manwe	PDP	Jerimon S Manwe	PDP
Sardauna/Gashaka/Kurmi	S.M. Nguroje	PDP	Ibrahim Tukur El-Sadu	PDP
Takuma/Donga/Ussa	Albert Tanimu Sam Tsokwa	PDP	Albert Tanimu Sam Tsokwa	PDP
Wukari/Ibi	Ishaika Mohammad Bawa	PDP	Ishaika Mohammad Bawa	PDP

== Results ==
=== Bali/Gassol ===
PDP candidate Haruna Manu won the election, defeating other party candidates.

2011 Nigerian House of Representatives election in Taraba State
Party	Candidate	Votes	%
PDP	Haruna Manu		
PDP hold			

=== Jalingo/Yorro/Zing ===
LP candidate Ibrahim Yakubu Saleh won the election, defeating other party candidates.

2011 Nigerian House of Representatives election in Taraba State
Party	Candidate	Votes	%
LP	Ibrahim Yakubu Saleh		
LP hold			

=== Karim Lamido/Lau/Ardo-Kola ===
PDP candidate Jerimon S Manwe won the election, defeating other party candidates.

2011 Nigerian House of Representatives election in Taraba State
Party	Candidate	Votes	%
PDP	Jerimon S Manwe		
PDP hold			

=== Sardauna/Gashaka/Kurmi ===
PDP candidate Ibrahim Tukur El-Sadu won the election, defeating other party candidates.

2011 Nigerian House of Representatives election in Taraba State
Party	Candidate	Votes	%
PDP	Ibrahim Tukur El-Sadu		
PDP hold			

=== Takuma/Donga/Ussa ===
PDP candidate Albert Tanimu Sam Tsokwa won the election, defeating other party candidates.

2011 Nigerian House of Representatives election in Taraba State
Party	Candidate	Votes	%
PDP	Albert Tanimu Sam Tsokwa		
PDP hold			

=== Wukari/Ibi ===
PDP candidate Ishaika Mohammad Bawa won the election, defeating other party candidates.

2011 Nigerian House of Representatives election in Taraba State
Party	Candidate	Votes	%
PDP	Ishaika Mohammad Bawa		
PDP hold			
