= Adunni Bankole =

Nigerian businesswoman

- Born: March 1959; Abeokuta, Ogun State, Nigeria
- Died: 3 January 2015 (aged 55)
- Other name: Yeye Mokun of Owu kingdom
- Occupation: Businesswoman
- Spouse: Alani Bankole
- Relatives: Dimeji Bankole (stepson)

Adunni Bankole (Yoruba pronunciation: [àdúnní bànkɔ́lé]; March 1959 – 3 January 2015) was a Nigerian society matriarch and businesswoman. She was the Yeye Mokun of Owu kingdom, a city in Abeokuta, the capital of Ogun State, southwestern Nigeria.

== Personal life ==
She was born in March 1959 at Owu kingdom of Abeokuta in Ogun State, southwestern Nigeria. She was married to the second republic politician, Chief Alani Bankole who was the father of the former speaker of the house of representatives, Honorable Dimeji Bankole.

== Death ==
She died of heart attack on 3 January 2015 following heart surgery. It was reported that she died a few hours before her daughter's wedding ceremony.

== See also ==
- Dimeji Bankole
