= Aminu Sani Jaji =

Nigerian politician

Federal Representative
- Constituency: Kaura Namoda/Birnin Magaji

Personal details
- Occupation: Politician

Aminu Sani Jaji is a Nigerian politician, business and a philanthropist. He is a member of the Nigerian House of Representatives, representing the Kaura Namoda/Birnin Magaji Federal Constituency in Zamfara State.
