= Lawan Shettima Ali =

Nigerian politician

Lawan Shettima Ali,(born on 15 January 1966), is a Nigerian politician representing the Bursari/Geidam/Yunusari Federal Constituency of Yobe State in the House of Representatives.

== Background and early life ==
Ali was born on 15 January 1966. He is from Yobe state, Nigeria.

== Career ==
Ali began his political journey as a member of the Yobe State House of Assembly, serving from 1991 to 1993. He served as a Special Adviser on Political and Assembly Matters, to the Governor of Yobe State, Bukar Abba Ibrahim. He was elected under the All Progressives Congress (APC) platform, into the House of Representatives since 2019. During the 9th Assembly, he held the position of Deputy Chairman of the House Committee on Media and Public Affairs, and he is currently serving the 10th Assembly.
