= The Nation (Nigeria) =

Nigerian English daily newspaper

- Type: Daily newspaper
- Publisher: Vintage Press Limited
- Editor: Adeniyi Adesina
- Founded: 31 July 2006
- Language: English
- Headquarters: Mushin, Lagos State, Nigeria
- Website: www.thenationonlineng.net

The Nation is a daily newspaper published in Lagos, Nigeria. According to a 2009 survey it was the second-most-read newspaper in Nigeria, and this result was repeated in a 2011 report by The Advertisers' Association of Nigeria (ADVANS).

== Overview ==
The paper's website says it stands for freedom, justice and the market economy. Its target audience is the business and political elite, the affluent, the educated and the upwardly mobile. The paper has been accused of spreading fake news stories. In 2024, The Economist reported that The Nation had been used a vector to spread Russian disinformation about Olena Zelenska.

The Nation has printing plants in Lagos, Abuja and Port Harcourt.

The newspaper covers business and economy, public policies, the democratic process and institutions of democracy, sports, arts and culture.

The newspaper became the first of its kind to gain nationwide circulation across the 36 states of Nigeria within two years of operation. This was a result of its popular eight-page pull-out Thursday publication titled Campuslife, a medium specially dedicated to student journalists and writers across the tertiary institutions in Nigeria. The Campuslife pull-out, with the late Ngozi Nwozor-Agbo as pioneer editor, helped the newspaper to become a household name across Nigeria, and several student journalists and correspondents whom the paper gave the opportunity to write for it as undergraduates are now renowned in their various professions.

In April 2010, Edo Ugbagwu, a reporter who covered court cases for The Nation, was killed by gunmen. The reason was not known.

The chairman of the editorial board is Sam Omatseye.
