= Temidayo Ibitoye =

Nigerian journalist and a documentary filmmaker

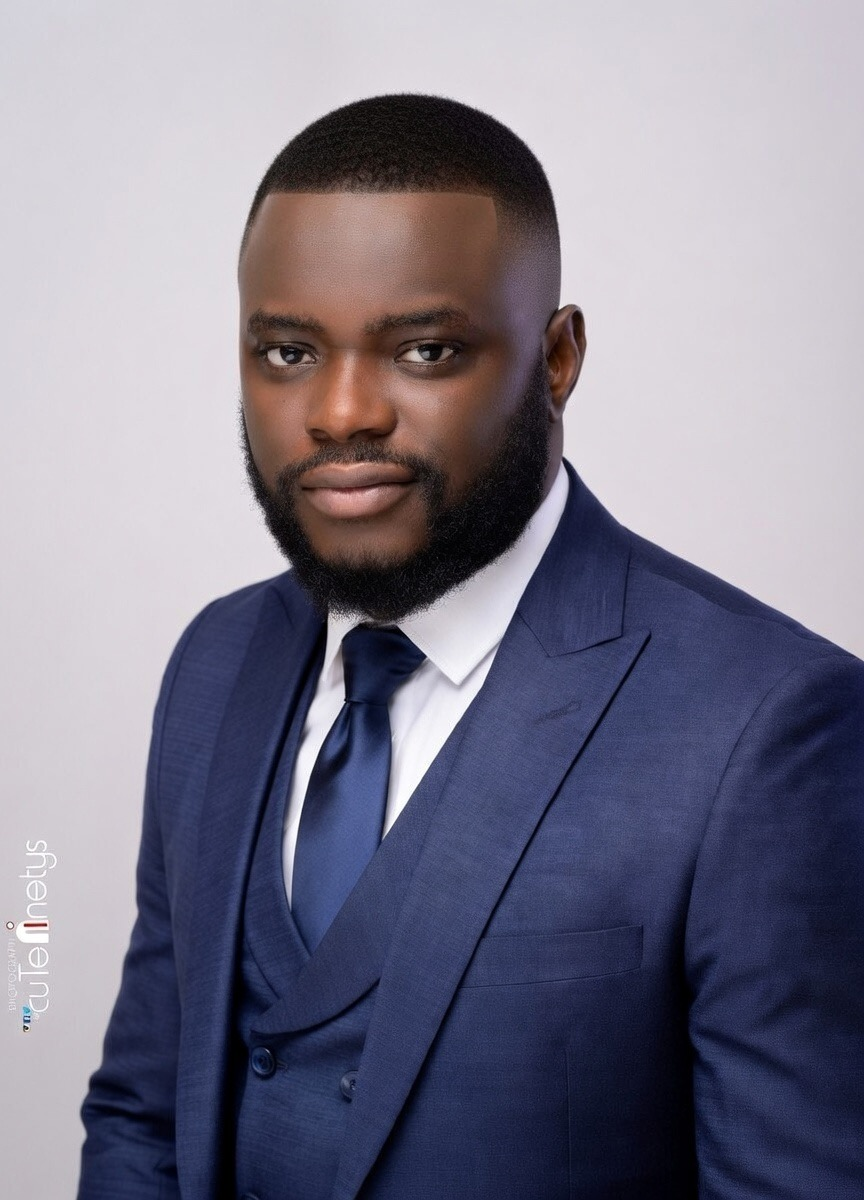
- Born: Ilorin, Nigeria
- Education: New York Film Academy; Harvard Kennedy School; Pan-Atlantic University; Ahmadu Bello University
- Occupations: Entrepreneur; Journalist; Filmmaker
- Organization(s): Dinovate; United Nations Development Programme (UNDP)
- Known for: Storytelling for social impact
- Notable work: He is the founder of Dinovate, a media and communications company that leverages storytelling for social impact, inclusion, and development

Temidayo Ibitoye is a Nigerian filmmaker, communications specialist, diplomat and social entrepreneur whose work focuses on development communication, social and behavioral change and documentary storytelling. He is the founder of Dinovate, a Nigerian media and social impact organization that leverages storytelling for social impact, inclusion, and development.

== Early life and education ==
Ibitoye was born in Ilorin, Nigeria. He holds a Bachelor's degree in Chemical Engineering from Ahmadu Bello University, Zaria, and a Master's degree in Media and Communication from the School of Media and Communication, Pan-Atlantic University, Nigeria. He is an alumnus of the New York Film Academy where he studied film production. He has also completed executive education at the Harvard Kennedy School of Government, United States.

== Career ==
Temidayo Ibitoye began his career in journalism as a campuslife correspondent of The Nation Newspaper, before transitioning into visual storytelling, film production, and development communications. He joined the United Nations Development Programme(UNDP) in 2021 and served as a communications specialist working with the Africa Borderlands Centre and the Resilience Hub for Africa in Nairobi, Kenya. In this role, he led media, visibility and supported cross-country communications strategy, impact storytelling, and donor-facing visibility across the region, highlighting resilience, cross-border livelihoods, and inclusion in Africa.

Ibitoye has worked extensively with globally recognized organizations including the World Bank, United Nations Development Programme (UNDP), The Mastercard Foundation, ECOWAS, Gates Foundation and The African Union, producing strategic media content focused on development, resilience, gender equity, and community transformation. He served the World Economic Forum, Global Shapers as Curator of the Port Harcourt Hub in 2016 and represented the Hub at the World Economic Forum events in Geneva and Johannesburg. In 2017, Ibitoye was nominated to the Federal Government of Nigeria’s Inter-Ministerial Technical Working Group on the Niger Delta, convened under the Office of the Vice President, becoming the youngest member of the high-level advisory group.

He is the founder of Dinovate, a communications firm based in Nigeria, Kenya and the United States, which focuses on storytelling, media production, research, and training.

Temidayo Ibitoye has been invited to speak at numerous international conferences, film forums, universities, and development platforms. His engagements have focused on topics such as storytelling for social impact, development communication, and amplifying marginalized voices through media. His films have been screened to audiences across Africa, Europe and America.

== Projects ==
- What We Carry: a feature documentary that explores the invisible burdens individuals carry—spanning trauma, addiction, identity, and resilience.
- The Boy in the Basement: a feature film inspired by real stories of addiction and trauma about resilience, hope, and the fight to be free.
- Borderlands: A documentary series produced and directed by Ibitoye, Borderlands explores everyday life and challenges in Africa's border communities. The series has received international recognition and has been showcased at film festivals and events including docUNight by UN Copenhagen and Utrecht University.
- Nigeria for Women Project: In collaboration with the World Bank, this series documented stories of women's empowerment, showcasing the impact of gender-focused development initiatives across Nigeria.
- Dinner with my family (short film)

== Awards and recognition ==
- Nelson Mandela Leadership Award (2026)
- Winner, Iconic Prize for Africa's Economic Advancement and Honoree, 100 Iconic Personalities of the Year (2026)
- Winner, Nigerian Youth Advocacy for Good Governance Award (2026)
- Best International Documentary Nominee, Begin Film Festival, Los Angeles (2024)
- Best Documentary Nominee, NGO Film Festival, Rome (2024)
- Nominee, Global Entrepreneurship Festival Award (2024)
- Nominee, Africa Excellence Awards, AMEA Markets (2025)
- Nominee, Nigeria Blog Awards, (2013)
- Winner, Cocacola/The Nation Prize for journalism (2010)
- Winner, Nigeria Blog Awards, Technology Category (2012)
