= Babangida Nguroje =

Nigerian politician

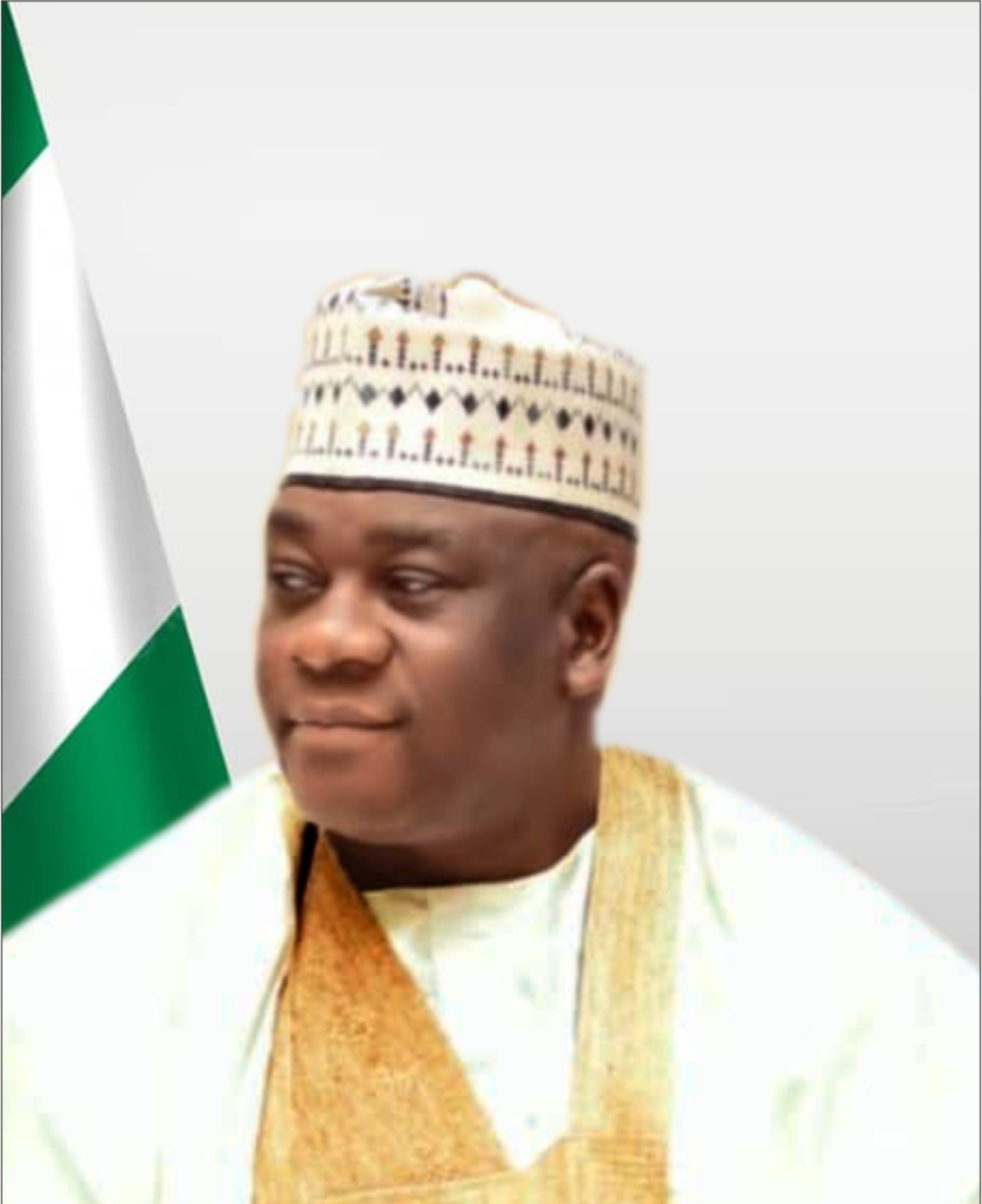
Nguroje in 2024

Babangida S. M. Nguroje is a former Deputy Speaker of the House of Representatives of Nigeria. He represented the Sardauna/Gashaka/Kurmi Federal Constituency of Taraba State in the 5th (2003–2007) and 6th (2007–2011) National Assemblies under the People's Democratic Party (PDP). Nguroje holds several titles and awards, including Garkuwan Sardauna, Makama Gashaka, and the Order of the Federal Republic of Nigeria (OFR).

== Early life and education ==
Nguroje was born in 1971 in Nguroje, a town in the Sardauna Local Government Area of Taraba State. He had his early education at Central Primary School Nguroje in 1983, followed by secondary education at the Federal Government College Wukari in the old Gongola State, now Taraba State. He then proceeded to the University of Maiduguri, where he obtained a Bachelor of Science (B.Sc.) in Business Administration, graduating in 1997. He also holds a Doctorate degree (PhD Honoris Causa) in Philanthropy Management from Pottstown University, USA (African campus), awarded in 2019.

== Career ==
During his time in politics, Nguroje was elected twice into the Federal House of Representatives, representing the people of Sardauna/Gashaka/Kurmi Federal Constituency of Taraba State (from 2003 to 2011). He is the National Coordinator of the All Progressives Congress (APC) Ex-Legislators Forum. He also served as the immediate past chairman of the Board of the Governing Council for the Nigerian Investment Promotion Commission (NIPC), and was the Director for North East in the disbanded Presidential Campaign Council of the Bola Ahmed Tinubu/Shettima campaign organization.
