= Dimeji Bankole =

Nigerian politician (born 1969)

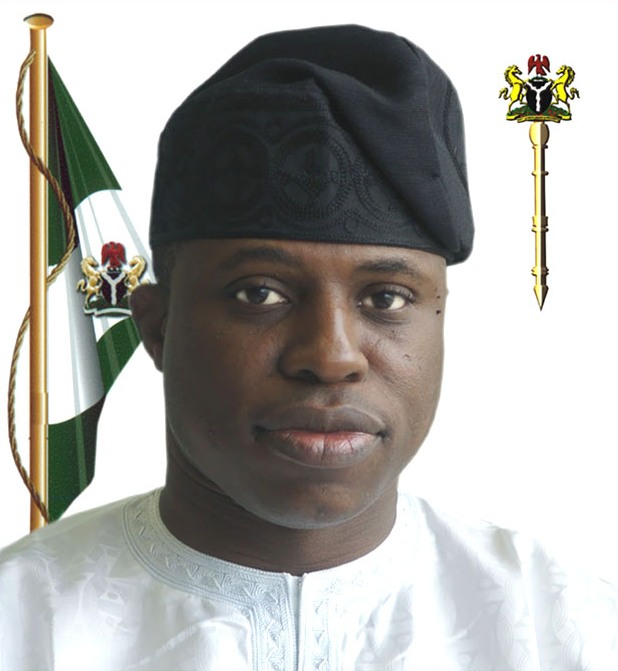

11th Speaker of the House of Representatives of Nigeria
- In office 1 November 2007 – 6 June 2011
- Deputy: Usman Bayero Nafada
- Preceded by: Patricia Etteh
- Succeeded by: Aminu Waziri Tambuwal

Member of the House of Representatives of Nigeria from Ogun
- In office 3 June 2003 – 6 June 2011
- Preceded by: Hon. Lasole Abraham Lanre
- Succeeded by: Hon. Williams Olusegun
- Constituency: Abeokuta South

Personal details
- Born: 14 November 1969 (age 56) Abeokuta, Ogun State, Nigeria
- Party: All Progressives Congress (APC)
- Parents: Alani Bankole (father); Atinuke Bankole (mother)
- Relatives: Adunni Bankole (stepmother)
- Education: University of Reading (BA); Harvard University (MPA)
- Profession: Politician; businessman; economist
- Website: www.dimejibankole.org

Sabur (Note: Also Saburi.) Oladimeji "Dimeji" Bankole (born 14 November 1969) is a Nigerian politician who served as the 11th Speaker of the House of Representatives of Nigeria. He was the Action Democratic Party candidate in the 2019 Ogun State gubernatorial election but lost to the All Progressives Congress candidate, Dapo Abiodun.

== Early life, education and career ==
A Yoruba man of aristocratic background, he was a businessman before being elected to the House of representative. A Muslim of Egba origin, Bankole was born in Abeokuta, in what is now known as Ogun State, on 14 November 1969. His father, Alani Bankole, a businessman, was a former National Vice-chairman and acting Chairman of the All Nigeria Peoples Party (ANPP) and holder of the chieftaincy titles of the Oluwo of Iporo Ake and the Seriki Jagunmolu of Egbaland, and his mother, Atinuke Bankole, was herself the Ekerin Iyalode of Egbaland.

Bankole schooled at the Baptist Boys' High School, Abeokuta starting 1979; and then later proceeded to the Albany College, London, England, in 1985. In 1989, Bankole secured admission to study economics at the University of Reading, England. After graduating in 1991, he enrolled for a short course at University of Oxford's Officers' Training Corps, Oxford. He topped it off by reading Public Finance Management at the Harvard University, Cambridge, Massachusetts, US, in 2005.

Bankole obtained a Master of Public Administration degree from John F. Kennedy School of Government, Harvard University, USA in 2005. In 2014, he became a Mason Fellow in Public Policy and Management at John F. Kennedy School of Government, Harvard University, USA.

In 1991, Bankole passed D.A.B selection into Royal Military Academy Sandhurst while taking courses for military officers at Oxford University where he was in the Artillery Corps.

Bankole is a polo player, and is a member of the Lagos Polo Club and the Guards Polo Club, Abuja with defence as his preferred position. He also enjoys football.

== Private sector ==
An economist, Bankole is chairman, Aspire Integrated Consultants Nigeria (since 2012) and Vice President, Africa House London (since 2016).

Previously, Bankole was a Director of Freight Agencies Nigeria Limited from 1995 until 1998, executive director of Operations of West African Aluminium Products Limited from 1998 until 2004, and Director of ASAP Limited from 2000 until 2003.

== Public sector - House of Representatives of Nigeria ==
In 2003, Bankole was elected to the House of Representatives on the Peoples Democratic Party (PDP) ticket to represent the Abeokuta South Federal Constituency of Ogun State. He was Deputy Chairman of the House Committee on Finance while Aminu Bello Masari was Speaker, (Farouk Lawan was chairman of the committee) He was also previously Chairman of the House Committee on Land Transport. Other committees he has sat on, are the panels on Defence, Internal Affairs, and Banking and Currency.

Bankole was re-elected in April 2007. He considers his legislative interests to be those related to defence and finance.

=== Speaker of the House ===
In September 2007, a committee questioned Speaker Patricia Etteh about spending the sum of ₦628 million ($4.8m) on home renovation and automobiles. She denied wrongdoing, but many representatives were unhappy with her attempts to defend herself, blows were traded on the floor of the House, and Etteh had to be escorted from the chamber. Former President Olusegun Obasanjo and many top PDP members continued to back her, but a large segment of the party, led by Lawan and Bankole, called for her resignation. It was reported that Bankole, among multiple other contenders, hoped to succeed her as early as 5 October 2007.

After Etteh's resignation from the post on 30 October (along with her deputy, who was also caught up in the scandal), the so-called Integrity Group (anti-Etteh group) member, Terngu Tsegba became interim Speaker.

==== Nomination ====
On 1 November, he was elected to succeed Etteh. The election began at 10.30am. The House was short of the statutory 360 members because three (Moses Segun Oladimeji, Joe Anota and Aminu Shuaibu Safana) died. Two constituencies were yet to elect their representatives. 328 of the 355 members voted. Samson Osagie of Edo State nominated Bankole for the post of Speaker, and Lynda Ikpeazu of Anambra State seconded the proposal. His challenger was Osun State Representative George Jolaoye, whom he beat by 304 votes to 20 (and 4 abstentions). Etteh was among those who voted against Bankole. The new deputy speaker was Usman Bayero Nafada. Bankole was declared speaker at 1.30pm.

In his acceptance speech, entitled "We Stand Upon The Threshold of History", Bankole said "I am taking over the mantle of leadership at a very difficult time. But these are hard times, we need to build confidence again and assure the populace that we are still their representatives. I want an independent house that Nigerians will be proud of, this is my first task."

==== Tenure ====
One week after his election, political opponents claimed that Bankole had not completed his National Youth Service Corps (N.Y.S.C) service, which is mandatory for all Nigerian university graduates under thirty years of age when they graduate, and called for his resignation over the issue. Bankole provided his N.Y.S.C discharge certificate, ending the rumour. On 22 June 2010 Bankole suspended 11 members of parliament indefinitely for disorderliness and fighting in the house.

==== Return of unspent funds by government ministries ====
During his tenure, the House of Representatives as a result of performance of its oversight function ensured that Federal Ministries, Departments and Agencies (MDA's) returned unspent budgeted funds amounting to about 450 billion naira to the government treasury in 2007 while about 350 billion naira was again recovered in 2008. In total, the House of Representatives ensured the return of about 1 trillion naira unspent funds by MDA's as part of the annual budgetary process under Bankole's speakership. These were unprecedented in the history of oversight in Nigeria's legislature. Up until then, MDA's did not return unspent funds. Also, the House of Representatives discovered that about 5 trillion Naira generated revenue were never remitted by MDA's for the past 5 years before investigation.

==== Termination of inflated Abuja Runway contract ====
Under Bankole, the 64 billion naira contract for the second runway for the Nnamdi Azikwe Airport in Abuja was investigated and found to be grossly inflated. The contract was thus terminated by the Federal Government of Nigeria.

==== Bills ====
Under him, the House of Representatives accepted 328 motions, approved 282 resolutions and passed 136 bills. These bills include the Freedom of Information (FOI) Act and Fiscal Responsibility Act which ensured that all revenue-generating agencies of government present their budgets for scrutiny every year. The agencies, which include the CBN, NNPC and Customs spent trillions of naira yearly without appropriation by the National Assembly.

=== Trial ===
In 2011, Bankole was tried by Nigeria's anti-corruption agency and was cleared of all charges.

The judge while clearing Bankole stated that the House of Representatives incurred a loan from a bank to run its expenses, the loan was paid back fully to the bank and Bankole was not a beneficiary of the loan in any capacity, therefore, no crime was committed.

=== ADP Governorship candidate ===
Ex-Speaker, Dimeji Bankole on Saturday 6 March 2018, emerged as the governorship candidate of the (ADP) Action Democratic Party in Ogun State in advance of the Nigeria general elections in 2019.

== Personal life ==
Dimeji Bankole divorced his first wife, Olaitan Bankole in 2017. This made him a much sought after bachelor in the circle of eligible spinsters within and outside Nigeria for a while. He got married again on 15 January 2021, to Miss Aisha Shinkafi Saidu, according to Islamic rights.

The wedding was held at Harrow Park, Ahmadu Bello Way, Abuja and it had in attendance several politicians including Aminu Tambuwal then governor of Sokoto state. Nigerian musicians Laycon and Timi Dakolo were also present at the event and they thrilled guests with lovely music.

His bride Miss Aisha Shinkafi Saidu is the step-daughter of the current state governor of Kebbi State, Abubakar Atiku Bagudu. She is a lawyer and graduate of the University of Hull in the UK. She is a granddaughter of late political heavyweight and onetime head of Nigeria's security organisation Alhaji Umaru Shinkafi, Marafan Sokoto and her mother is Shinkafi's daughter and a sister to the former Governor of Zamfara State, Mahmud Shinkafi.
