= Speaker of the House of Representatives of Nigeria =

Presiding officer of the House of Representatives of Nigeria

Speaker of the House of Representatives of the Federal Republic of Nigeria
- Incumbent; Tajudeen Abbas since 13 June 2023
- Legislative Branch of the Federal Government
- Style: Mr Speaker (informal); The Honourable (formal)
- Member of: Nigerian House of Representatives; National Assembly Commission
- Seat: National Assembly Complex, Three Arms Zone, Abuja
- Appointer: Indirect House Election
- Term length: 4 years renewable
- Constituting instrument: Constitution of Nigeria
- Inaugural holder: Sir Frederic Metcalfe (Colonial); Jaja Wachuku (indigenous)
- Formation: 12 January 1955; 71 years ago
- Deputy: Deputy Speaker of the House of Representatives

The speaker of the House of Representatives is the presiding officer of the Federal House of Representatives of Nigeria, elected by its membership. The current House Speaker is Tajudeen Abbas who was elected Speaker of House of Representatives of Nigeria on 13 June 2023.

== History ==
Sir Frederic Metcalfe of Great Britain became the first Speaker of the House of Representatives of Nigeria after its inauguration on 12 January 1955 by John Macpherson. He was replaced by the first indigenous speaker, Jaja Wachuku, in 1959. As Speaker of the House, Wachuku received Nigeria's Instrument of Independence, also known as Freedom Charter, on 1 October 1960, from Princess Alexandra of Kent (Alexandra was Elizabeth II's representative at the Nigerian Independence ceremonies). Chaha Biam hails from Ukum Local Government Area of Benue State. He was elected to the House of Representative on the platform of NPN in the 1983 general elections and was elected as the Speaker of House of Representative in the short-lived second tenure of Alhaji Shehu Shagari, 1 October 1983 – 31 December 1983. Dimeji Bankole is the youngest Speaker in the history of the House of Representatives, elected at the age of 37.

== Selection and succession to presidency ==
The speaker is chosen in an indirect election conducted within the House of Representatives. The line of succession to the Nigerian presidency goes to the Vice President, and then the President of the Senate should both the President and Vice President be unable to discharge the powers and duties of office. The Speaker of the House is the third in line of succession.

== Office of the Speaker ==
The speaker is supported by their Chief of Staff.

== List of speakers ==
=== Federation and First Republic ===
Speaker		Term of office		Political party	Election
Portrait	Name	Took office	Left office	Political party	Election
	Sir Frederic Metcalfe	12 January 1955	January 1959	None	1954
	Jaja Wachuku	January 1959	14 November 1960	National Council of Nigeria and the Cameroons	1959
	Ibrahim Jalo Waziri	14 November 1960	15 January 1966	Northern People's Congress	1964

=== Military Government ===
The House of Representatives did not sit in this time.

=== Second Republic ===
Speaker		Term of office		Political party	Election
Portrait	Name	Took office	Left office	Political party	Election
	Edwin Ume-Ezeoke	1 October 1979	1 October 1983	National Party of Nigeria	1979
	Benjamin Chaha	1 October 1983	31 December 1983	National Party of Nigeria	1983

=== Military Government ===
The House of Representatives did not sit in this time.

=== Third Republic ===
Speaker		Term of office		Political party	Election
Portrait	Name	Took office	Left office	Political party	Election
	Agunwa Anaekwe	5 December 1992	17 November 1993	Social Democratic Party	1992

=== Military Government ===
The House of Representatives did not sit in this time.

=== Fourth Republic ===
Speaker		Term of office		Political party	Constituency	Election
Portrait	Name	Took office	Left office	Political party	Constituency	Election
	Salisu Buhari	3 June 1999	23 July 1999	People's Democratic Party		1999
	Ghali Umar Na'Abba	23 July 1999	3 June 2003	People's Democratic Party		1999
	Aminu Bello Masari	3 June 2003	5 June 2007	People's Democratic Party	Malumfashi / Kafur, Katsina	2003
	Patricia Etteh	5 June 2007	30 October 2007	People's Democratic Party	Ayedaade / Irewole / Isokan, Osun	2007
	Dimeji Bankole	1 November 2007	6 June 2011	People's Democratic Party	Abeokuta South, Ogun	2007
	Aminu Tambuwal	6 June 2011	29 May 2015	People's Democratic Party	Kebbe / Tambuwal, Sokoto	2011
	Yakubu Dogara	9 June 2015	9 June 2019	All Progressives Congress	Bogoro/Dass /Tafawa Balewa, Bauchi	2015
	Femi Gbajabiamila	11 June 2019	11 June 2023	All Progressives Congress	Surulere I, Lagos	2019
	Tajudeen Abbas	13 June 2023	Incumbent	All Progressives Congress	Zaria, Kaduna	2023
