= All Nigeria Peoples Party =

- Chairman: Chief Okey Nwosu
- Secretary-General: Hon. Lawan Shettima Ali
- Founded: 1998
- Dissolved: 2013
- Split from: All People's Party
- Merged into: All Progressives Congress
- Headquarters: Bassan Plaza Plot 759, Central Business District, Abuja
- Ideology: Conservatism; Social conservatism Economic liberalism Buharism
- Political position: Centre-right to right-wing
- Colours: Green, white, blue

The All Nigeria Peoples Party (ANPP) was a political party in Nigeria.

The ANPP was a household party in the extreme north of Nigeria, primarily due to its mass appeal among more religious voters. It was the strongest opposition party, controlling seven of the nation's thirty-six states at one point. The party's biggest achievement in the 2003 election was its gubernatorial victory in Kano State where it defeated the ruling People's Democratic Party (PDP) to take control of one of the country's most populous states.

Following the 2007 election, the ANPP challenged the victory of Umaru Yar'Adua, although it was announced on 27 June 2007 following talks, that the ANPP had agreed to join Yar'Adua's government of national unity. There was reportedly disagreement within the ANPP about the talks. Buhari subsequently denounced the idea in a BBC interview and suggested that the decision was only made by part of the party, alleging that they were "just looking for jobs for themselves".

In February 2013, the party merged with the Action Congress of Nigeria, the All Progressives Grand Alliance, and the Congress for Progressive Change to form the All Progressives Congress.

== Political ideology ==
The ANPP is a conservative party with mass appeal among more religious voters. The party draws its strength predominantly from Northern Nigeria.

== Earlier incarnation ==
There was a party of the same name during the Second Republic, which was banned following the military coup of 1983 led by General Buhari.

The current party (founded in 1999) shares the same name, but with little or no resemblance, affinity, or affiliation to the original ANPP.

== Electoral history ==
=== Presidential elections ===
Election	Party candidate	Running mate	Votes	%	Result
2003	Muhammadu Buhari	Chuba Okadigbo	12,710,022	32.19%	Lost ✗
2007	Muhammadu Buhari	Edwin Ume-Ezeoke	6,605,299	18.72%	Lost ✗
2011	Ibrahim Shekarau	John Odigie Oyegun	917,012	2.40%	Lost ✗

=== House of Representative and Senate elections ===
Election	Party leader	House of Representatives					Senate				
Election	Party leader	Votes	%	Seats	+/–	Position	Votes	%	Seats	+/–	Position
2003	Edwin Ume-Ezeoke	8,021,531	27.44%	96 / 360	▲22	▲2nd	8,091,783	27.87%	27 / 109	▼2	▲2nd
2007	Edwin Ume-Ezeoke			62 / 360	▼34	2nd			16 / 109	▼11	2nd
2011	Edwin Ume-Ezeoke	2,900,306	10.16%	28 / 360	▼34	▼4th					
