= 2002 in Nigeria =

- Decades: 1980s; 1990s; 2000s; 2010s; 2020s
- See also: Other events of 2002; Timeline of Nigerian history

== Incumbents ==
=== Federal government ===
- President: Olusegun Obasanjo (PDP)
- Vice President: Atiku Abubakar (PDP)
- Senate President: Anyim Pius Anyim (PDP)
- House Speaker: Ghali Umar Na'Abba (PDP)
- Chief Justice: Muhammad Lawal Uwais

=== Governors ===
- Abia State: Orji Uzor Kalu
- Adamawa State: Boni Haruna
- Akwa Ibom State: Victor Attah
- Anambra State: Chinwoke Mbadinuju
- Bauchi State: Adamu Mu'azu
- Bayelsa State: Diepreye Alamieyeseigha
- Benue State: George Akume
- Borno State: Mala Kachalla
- Cross River State: Donald Duke
- Delta State: James Ibori
- Ebonyi State: Sam Egwu
- Edo State: Lucky Igbinedion
- Ekiti State: Niyi Adebayo
- Enugu State: Chimaroke Nnamani
- Gombe State: Abubakar Habu Hashidu
- Imo State: Achike Udenwa
- Jigawa State: Ibrahim Saminu Turaki
- Kaduna State: Ahmed Makarfi
- Kano State: Rabiu Kwankwaso
- Katsina State: Umaru Yar'Adua
- Kebbi State: Adamu Aliero
- Kogi State: Abubakar Audu
- Kwara State: Mohammed Lawal
- Lagos State: Bola Tinubu
- Nasarawa State: Abdullahi Adamu
- Niger State: Abdulkadir Kure
- Ogun State: Olusegun Osoba
- Ondo State: Adebayo Adefarati
- Osun State: Adebisi Akande
- Oyo State: Lam Adesina
- Plateau State: Joshua Dariye
- Rivers State: Peter Odili
- Sokoto State: Attahiru Bafarawa
- Taraba State: Jolly Nyame
- Yobe State: Bukar Ibrahim
- Zamfara State: Ahmad Sani Yerima

== Events ==
=== January ===
- January 27 — The Lagos Armoury Explosion killed at least 1,100 people and displaced over 20,000.

=== October ===
- October 10 — The International Court of Justice (ICJ) ruled against Nigeria in favor of Cameroon over the disputed oil-rich Bakassi peninsula territory.

=== November ===
- November — Religious riots erupt over the Miss World pageant hosted in Abuja; The pageant is subsequently moved to London.
