= 2000 in Nigeria =

- Decades: 1980s; 1990s; 2000s; 2010s; 2020s
- See also: Other events of 2000; Timeline of Nigerian history

The following lists events that happened during 2000 in Nigeria.

== Incumbents ==
=== Federal government ===
- President: Olusegun Obasanjo (PDP)
- Vice President: Atiku Abubakar (PDP)
- Senate President: Chuba Okadigbo (PDP) (Until 8 August); Anyim Pius Anyim (PDP) (Starting 8 August)
- House Speaker: Ghali Umar Na'Abba (PDP)
- Chief Justice: Muhammad Lawal Uwais

=== Governors ===
- Abia State: Orji Uzor Kalu (PDP)
- Adamawa State: Boni Haruna (PDP)
- Akwa Ibom State: Obong Victor Attah (PDP)
- Anambra State: Chinwoke Mbadinuju (PDP)
- Bauchi State: Adamu Mu'azu (PDP)
- Bayelsa State: Diepreye Alamieyeseigha (PDP)
- Benue State: George Akume (PDP)
- Borno State: Mala Kachalla (APP)
- Cross River State: Donald Duke (PDP)
- Delta State: James Ibori (PDP)
- Ebonyi State: Sam Egwu (PDP)
- Edo State: Lucky Igbinedion (PDP)
- Ekiti State: Niyi Adebayo (AD)
- Enugu State: Chimaroke Nnamani (PDP)
- Gombe State: Abubakar Habu Hashidu (APP)
- Imo State: Achike Udenwa (PDP)
- Jigawa State: Ibrahim Saminu Turaki (APP)
- Kaduna State: Ahmed Makarfi (PDP)
- Kano State: Rabiu Kwankwaso (PDP)
- Katsina State: Umaru Yar'Adua (PDP)
- Kebbi State: Adamu Aliero (APP)
- Kogi State: Abubakar Audu (APP)
- Kwara State: Mohammed Lawal (ANPP)
- Lagos State: Bola Tinubu (AD)
- Nasarawa State: Abdullahi Adamu (PDP)
- Niger State: Abdulkadir Kure (PDP)
- Ogun State: Olusegun Osoba (AD)
- Ondo State: Adebayo Adefarati (AD)
- Osun State: Adebisi Akande (AD)
- Oyo State: Lam Adesina (AD)
- Plateau State: Joshua Dariye (PDP)
- Rivers State: Peter Odili (PDP)
- Sokoto State: Attahiru Bafarawa (APP)
- Taraba State: Jolly Nyame (PDP)
- Yobe State: Bukar Ibrahim (APP)
- Zamfara State: Ahmad Sani Yerima (ANPP)

== Events ==
=== January ===
- 27 January - The government of Zamfara, a predominantly Muslim state, institutes Islamic law. Eleven other states in the north soon follow suit.

=== May ===
- May - Religious riots erupt in Kaduna over the implementation of Islamic law.

=== June ===
- 5 June - The Obasanjo administration establishes the Niger Delta Development Commission (NDDC) to tackle the human and ecological issues in the Niger Delta region of southern Nigeria.

=== October ===
- 1 October - Nigeria celebrates 40 years of independence from the United Kingdom.

== See also ==
- Timeline of Nigerian history
