= Executive Council of Ogun State =

Executive arm of Ogun State Government

The Ogun State Executive Council (also known as the Cabinet of Ogun State) is the highest formal governmental body that plays important roles in the Government of Ogun State headed by the Governor of Ogun State. It consists of the Deputy Governor, Secretary to the State Government, Chief of Staff, Commissioners who preside over ministerial departments, and the Governor's special aides. The council has its seat in Abeokuta, the Ogun State capital.

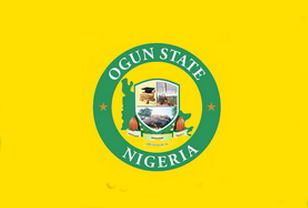
Flag of Ogun State

== Functions ==
The Executive Council exists to advise and direct the Governor. Their appointment as members of the Executive Council gives them the authority to execute power over their fields.

== Current cabinet ==
The current Executive Council is serving under the Dapo Abiodun administration.

=== Principal Officers ===
Office	Incumbent
Governor	Prince Dapo Abiodun
Deputy Governor	Engr. Noimot Salako-Oyedele
Chief Justice	Hon. Justice (Dr.) Mosunmola Arinola Dipeolu
Secretary to the State Government	Mr. Tokunbo Talabi
Head of Service	Mr. Kehinde Olufemi Onasanya
Chief of Staff	Dr. Oluwatoyin Taiwo
Deputy Chief of Staff	Vacant

=== Commissioners ===
Office	Incumbent
Attorney General and Commissioner for Justice	Oluwasina Ogungbade SAN
Commissioner for Agriculture	Mr. Bolu Owotomo
Commissioner for Budget and Economic Planning	Mr. Olaolu Olabimtan
Commissioner for Commerce and Industry	Mr. Adebola Emmanuel Sofela
Commissioner for Community Development and Cooperatives	Mr. Ademola Balogun
Commissioner for Culture and Tourism	Mr. Sesan Fagbayi
Commissioner for Education, Science, and Technology	Prof. Abayomi Arigbabu
Commissioner for Environment	Mr. Oladimeji Oresanya
Commissioner for Finance	Mr. Dapo Okubadejo
Commissioner for Forestry	Hon. Oludotun Taiwo
Commissioner for Health	Dr. Tomi Coker
Commissioner for Housing	Mr. Jamiu Omoniyi
Commissioner for Local Government and Chieftaincy Affairs	Hon. Ganiyu Hamzat
Commissioner for Rural Development	Mrs. Olufemi Ilori-Oduntan
Commissioner for Special Duties and Inter-governmental Affairs	Mrs. Funmi Efuwape
Commissioner for Urban and Physical Planning	TPL Tunji Odunlami
Commissioner for Women Affairs and Social Development	Mrs. Adijat Motunrayo Adeleye-Oladapo
Commissioner for Works and Infrastructure	Engr. Adebowale Akinsanya
Commissioner for Youth and Sports	Mr. Wasiu Isiaka
Commissioner for Transportation	Engr. Gbenga Dairo
Commissioner for Information and Strategy	Vacant

=== Special Advisers, Consultants, and Assistants ===
==== Special Advisers ====
Incumbent	Office
Hon. Adebiyi Adeleye Adewale	Special Adviser, Political Affairs
Hon. Adijat Motunrayo Adeleye-Oladapo	Special Adviser, Women Affairs & Social Development
Hon. Aina Ololade Salami	Special Adviser, Bureau of Lands & Survey
Engr. Babatunde Akeem Adesina	Special Adviser, Works and Infrastructure
Hon. Babatunde Olaotan	Special Adviser, Government House
Mr. Dayo Abiodun	Special Adviser, Information, Communication and Technology (ICT)
Prof J. S. Odemuyiwa	Special Adviser, Education, Science and Technology
Engr. Kunle Otun	Special Adviser, Special Duties (Water)
Mr. Olalekan Olude	Special Adviser, Job Creation and Youth Empowerment
Mrs. Oluyemisi Dawodu	Special Adviser, Trade
	Special Adviser, Environment
AIG. Olushola Kamar Subair (rtd)	Special Adviser. Security
Princess Peju Shote	Special Adviser, Rural Development
Hon. Remmy Hazzan	Special Adviser, Communications
Mrs. Ronke Soyombo	Special Adviser, Education, Science and Technology
Hon. Tajudeen Egunjobi	Special Adviser, Housing
Hon. Adegbenga Adeshina	Special Adviser, OGIRS
Mr. Jide Sanwo	Special Adviser, OGIRS
Engr. Lolu Adubifa	Special Adviser, Energy
Abiodun Fari-Arole	Special Adviser/MD OPIC
Dr. Reuben Olurotimi Ogungbe	Special Adviser, Health

==== Senior Consultants ====
Incumbents
Yewande Amusan
Ayo O. Olubori
Samuel D. Ayedogbon
Olugbenga Otenuga
Elizabeth O. Sonubi

==== Consultants ====
Incumbents
Taiwo A. Fagbemi
Adenrele Sonariwo
Olalekan Onamusi
Bolanle Kuku
Musbau Oyefeso
Masu’d A. Taiwo
Bola Adeyemi
Niyi Adesanya
Sheu Olanrewaju Adebayo
Ronke Onadeko
Olusegun B. Gbeleyi

==== Senior Special Assistants ====
Office	Incumbent
Senior Special Assistants for Agriculture	Esther Obafemi; Goke Dipe; Dele Osifade; Bode Adefala; Afolabi Muibat Ayoola
Senior Special Assistant for Agriculture Value Chain Development	Ludwig Kiefer
Senior Special Assistant for Boundary Matters	Olorunwo Ilemobayo
Senior Special Assistants on Environment	Hon. (Prince) Femi Akinwunmi
Senior Special Assistant for the Government House	Lekan Buari
Senior Special Assistant for Health	Ajibola Oladapo Amosu
Senior Special Assistant for Internal Revenue Services	Jamiu Adio Ojurongbe
Senior Special Assistant for Lands and Survey	Bimbola Oluyinka
Senior Special Assistants for Landscape	Tope Osifade; Muyiwa Coker
Senior Special Assistant for the Liaison Office in Abuja	Lola Adesope
Senior Special Assistant for the Media	Adejuwon I. Soyinka
Senior Special Assistant for the Office of the Deputy Governor	Abiodun Oyedele
Senior Special Assistants for the Office of the Governor	Williams Ainabe; Olapeju Shote; Sabitu Ogunsolu; Alao Semiu; Idowu Togun; Oluwaseyi-Enitan Olubode
Senior Special Assistant for the Political Affairs of the Central Senatorial District	Moshood Akinyele O.
Senior Special Assistant for the Political Affairs of the Eastern Senatorial District	Toyin G. Ayebusiwa
Senior Special Assistant for the Political Affairs of the Western Senatorial District	Isiaq A. Abass
Senior Special Assistant for Protocols and Ceremonials	Remi Onasanya
Senior Special Assistant for Signage and Advertising
Senior Special Assistant for Transportation	Kolapo Korede Osunsanya
