= 1999 in Nigeria =

The following lists events in 1999 in Nigeria.

== Incumbents ==
=== Federal government ===
- President: Abdulsalami Abubakar (until 29 May), Olusegun Obasanjo (starting 29 May)
- Vice President: Michael Akhigbe (until 29 May), Atiku Abubakar (starting 29 May)
- Senate President:
  - Until 3 June: Abolished
  - 3 June – 18 November: Evan Enwerem
  - Starting 18 November: Chuba Okadigbo
- House Speaker:
  - Until 3 June: Abolished
  - 3 June – 23 July Salisu Buhari
  - Starting July Ghali Umar Na'Abba
- Chief Justice: Muhammad Lawal Uwais

=== Governors ===
- Abia State: Orji Uzor Kalu (PDP) (starting 29 May)
- Adamawa State: Boni Haruna (PDP) (starting 29 May)
- Akwa Ibom State: Obong Victor Attah (PDP) (starting 29 May)
- Anambra State: Chinwoke Mbadinuju (PDP) (starting 29 May)
- Bauchi State: Adamu Mu'azu (PDP) (starting 29 May)
- Bayelsa State: Diepreye Alamieyeseigha (PDP) (starting 29 May)
- Benue State: George Akume (PDP) (starting 29 May)
- Borno State: Mala Kachalla (APP) (starting 29 May)
- Cross River State: Donald Duke (PDP) (starting 29 May)
- Delta State: James Ibori (PDP) (starting 29 May)
- Ebonyi State: Sam Egwu (PDP) (starting 29 May)
- Edo State: Lucky Igbinedion (PDP) (starting 29 May)
- Ekiti State: Niyi Adebayo (AD) (starting 29 May)
- Enugu State: Chimaroke Nnamani (PDP) (starting 29 May)
- Gombe State: Abubakar Habu Hashidu (APP) (starting 29 May)
- Imo State: Achike Udenwa (PDP) (starting 29 May)
- Jigawa State: Ibrahim Saminu Turaki (APP) (starting 29 May)
- Kaduna State: Ahmed Makarfi (PDP) (starting 29 May)
- Kano State: Rabiu Kwankwaso (PDP) (starting 29 May)
- Katsina State: Umaru Yar'Adua (PDP) (starting 29 May)
- Kebbi State: Adamu Aliero (APP) (starting 29 May)
- Kogi State: Abubakar Audu (APP) (starting 29 May)
- Kwara State: Mohammed Lawal (ANPP) (starting 29 May)
- Lagos State: Bola Tinubu (AD) (starting 29 May)
- Nasarawa State: Abdullahi Adamu (PDP) (starting 29 May)
- Niger State: Abdulkadir Kure (PDP) (starting 29 May)
- Ogun State: Olusegun Osoba (AD) (starting 29 May)
- Ondo State: Adebayo Adefarati (AD) (starting 29 May)
- Osun State: Adebisi Akande (AD) (starting 29 May)
- Oyo State: Lam Adesina (AD) (starting 29 May)
- Plateau State: Joshua Dariye (PDP) (starting 29 May)
- Rivers State: Peter Odili (PDP) (starting 29 May)
- Sokoto State: Attahiru Bafarawa (APP) (starting 29 May)
- Taraba State: Jolly Nyame (PDP) (starting 29 May)
- Yobe State: Bukar Ibrahim (APP) (starting 29 May)
- Zamfara State: Ahmad Sani Yerima (ANPP) (starting 29 May)

== Events ==
=== February ===
- February 10 — Former Head of State, Olusegun Obasanjo wins the presidential election.

=== May ===
- May 10 — Igbinedion University, Okada is established.
- May 29 — The Nigerian Fourth Republic is inaugurated. Olusegun Obasanjo is sworn in as the second Executive President of Nigeria.

=== December ===
- December 19 — President Obasanjo orders troops to raid the town of Odi in the Niger Delta, in response to the murders of twelve policemen at the hands of local militia; The troops razed the town of Odi.

== Births ==
- July 14 – Adijat Adenike Olarinoye, weightlifter

== See also ==
- Timeline of Nigerian history
