= Gbenga Otenuga =

Nigerian politician

Gbenga Otenuga (born January 22, 1956), also known as Olugbenga Otenuga, is a Senior Consultant to Ibikunle Amosun, the former Governor of Ogun State, Nigeria and a member of the Executive Council of Ogun State. He was previously the Governor's Chief of Staff. He was a former Commissioner for Youth and Sports and Commissioner for Urban and Physical Development in Ogun State.

== Early life and education ==
A native of Ijebu Ode Ogun State, Otenuga was born in 1956. He attended the Methodist Primary School, Ekotedo and later St. Gabriel Secondary Commercial School in Mokola, Ibadan. In 1979, he proceeded to Ogun State Polytechnic (now Moshood Abiola Polytechnic, Abeokuta) to study accountancy and graduated in 1983.

== Career ==
In 1982 during his accountancy studies, Otenuga worked at African Petroleum (AP) for his Industrial Training Programme. While there, he actively participated in finance, budget and information management related activities. By September 1983, he was at Chevron Texaco Nigeria Limited for his national service year in the National Youth Service Corps. On completion, the management of Chevron retained him as a permanent employee.

He later joined chartered accountants Peat Marwick, Ani, Ogunde & Co., (now KPMG). In 1985, he was promoted to senior audit trainee. While there, he was involved in several clients’ system design, tax management auditing etc., until 1988.

In the late 80's, Otenuga teamed up with other professionals in partnership, at Broadway Communications, with a focus on public relations and advertising. Between 1989 and 1991 he served as the organisation's administration and finance director.

In 1992, Otenuga incorporated High Horizon Limited, a company producing industrial and corporate uniforms, work and safety wear and security accessories, becoming its first Chief Executive Officer.

Otenuga sits on the board of other companies on a non-executive director basis.

== Politics ==
While a student, Otenuga participated in Ogun State Polytechnic Students’ Union government. He later became member and leader in ACN in Ogun East. He was sworn in as Honourable Commissioner, Youth & Sports and thus a member of the Executive Council of Ogun State, in July 2011; a position he held until November 2013 when he was moved to Ministry of Urban & Physical Development as the Honourable Commissioner, a position he held until October 2014. In 2015 he became the incumbent Senior Consultant to the Governor.

He remains an acknowledged leader of the party which is now known as All Progressive Congress (APC), in the Ogun East Senatorial District.

== Personal life ==
Gbenga Otenuga is married with children.
