= Human capital flight from Nigeria =

Emigration of skilled workers from Nigeria

Brain drain from Nigeria, nicknamed Japa (meaning run or to flee in Yoruba) is the exodus of middle-class and highly skilled Nigerians which has been occurring in waves since the late 1980s to early 1990s. This trend was initially restricted to certain professions but has now become free for all with the introduction of visa programs in order to fill workforce gaps in developed nations. This was sparked by an economic downturn following a period of economic boom in the 1970s and 1980s propelled by the discovery of oil wells in Nigeria.

== Background ==
By mid 1980s, medical teachers started leaving for the West and the Middle East. The young doctors they taught also left for Western postgraduate education. The economic downturn which occurred in the late 80's made workers particularly in the healthcare sector to seek greener pastures at all costs.

=== Health sector ===
Medical doctors have identified poor working conditions and low remuneration as reasons for emigrating to nations with better working environment such as the UK, US and Canada, mostly, remuneration, opportunities for career progression and an overall improved quality of life. Paucity of healthcare resources and poor funding of the health sector, leading to frequent strikes has also been identified as a factor affecting brain drain in Nigeria. In 2019, of Nigeria's annual budget of N8.8trn only 3.6% was allocated to healthcare.

In a 2017 survey carried out by Nigeria's polling agency, NOI Polls, in conjunction with Nigerian Health Watch it was found that most doctors seek opportunities abroad as 88 percent of doctors were considering work opportunities abroad. On average, 12 doctors a week move to the UK.

Another survey identified push factors including the desire for better life which was said to be the most important factor for seeking greener pasture. Pull factors including better working conditions was also considered as a very important reason for migration. Similar findings were noted in the #CanadaRush Study carried out by the African Polling Institute (API) which identified Nigeria's poor economic performance, lack of security of lives and property and the poor leadership as the ultimate and marginalization "push factors" and a driver of recent emigration pattern to Canada which has also introduced immigration policies with a background enabling environment. These serve as significant "pull factors" for the educated and highly skilled Nigerians.

Chris Ngige, Nigeria's minister of labor alluded the brain drain to having excess doctors therefore necessitating export.

=== Educational sector ===
Due to the economic prosperity of the 1970s and 1980s propelled by the discovery of oil wells, Nigeria became a destination for economic migrants seeing as there was an influx of teachers and lecturers from Ghana and India into public secondary schools and universities. The government was able to pay them until the economic downturn and an IMF-mandated structural adjustment program. Austerity measures which were imposed led to a downturn in funding of the educational sector. This led to significant student uprisings and a mass exodus of the expatriates as well as a net export of Nigerian skilled workers.

Poor leadership and corruption has been identified by another study as another factor leading to brain drain. It found that Nigerian students have interests in travelling to developed societies after completion of their study. Other causes of brain drain identified include:

- Mass unemployment
- Poor salaries
- Poor working conditions
- Mass poverty
- Religious crises
- Communal crises
- Political crises
- Lack of quality education

The entertainment industry is also affected as some creatives including Opeyemi Aiyeola, Doris Simeon, Lara George, eLdee, Lola Alao, Regina Askia and Bayo Bankole have migrated to other nations.

== Effects ==
Medical schools and residency training centers in Nigeria are supported by government subvention. This is an investment which becomes beneficial to their host countries. According to the Mo Ibrahim Foundation, It costs an African country between $21,000 and $51,000 to train a single medical doctor. Nigeria is one of such countries which have lost more than $2bn since 2010 to training doctors who later migrate. Countries such as the UK benefit from this, as 10% of doctors working in the UK come from African nations, saving the UK about $2.7bn by recruiting these doctors. Over half of the doctors registered with the Medical and Dental Council of Nigeria (MDCN) practice outside Nigeria. The doctor patient ratio is 1 doctor per 5,000 people as against the WHO recommended 1 per 600 people. Asides the United Kingdom, countries such as the United States, Canada, Australia and South Africa also attract Nigerian talent, with Saudi Arabia running recruiting campaigns in the country. The migration of existing medical personnel will endanger the development of future Human Resources for health. Shortage of medical specialists contributes towards medical tourism as a handful of Nigerians spend ₦359.2 billion annually while seeking care abroad.

Nigeria is one of the African countries with the worst indices for health. with the second highest number of people living with HIV and the highest number of malaria-related deaths. Although maternal mortality rate has declined steadily since 1990, it still lags behind other nations.

Other effects of brain drain that have been identified include loss of human capital assets, lost income from the loss of tax of the migrated manpower to foreign countries and the loss of capital invested in the subsidised public education of migrated manpower.

== Efforts to reverse trend ==
There are no government policies to proactively address the decimation of higher education in Nigeria. Some solutions that have however been proffered to the protracted problem of brain drain including good leadership, mass employment, better salary and working conditions as well as a system for rewarding diligent staff.

Many Nigerians who have emigrated or plan to emigrate to North America and Europe have expressed the unlikelihood of their return or return of the children raised in their new country of settlement to Nigeria as there is a general distrust in the Nigerian political class and their ability to reverse the ongoing downward spiral in the educational sector.

In May 2018, Canada expressed interest in working together with Nigeria in order to assist the Nigerian government in curbing unchecked migration. In an attempt to restrict the recruitment of foreign healthcare workers, the United Kingdom introduced a new policy in February 2021.

== See also ==
- Economic migrant
- Reverse brain drain
- Economy of Nigeria
- Nigerian diaspora
- Higher education in Nigeria
