= 1999 Enugu State gubernatorial election =

1999 gubernatorial election in Enugu State, Nigeria

- January 9, 1999
Nominee	Chimaroke Nnamani
Party	PDP	All People's Party (Nigeria)
Popular vote	602,960	235,000
Governor before election
Okwesilieze Nwodo
NRC
Elected Governor
Chimaroke Nnamani
PDP

The 1999 Enugu State gubernatorial election occurred in Nigeria on January 9, 1999. The PDP nominee Chimaroke Nnamani won the election, defeating the APP candidate.

Chimaroke Nnamani emerged PDP candidate.

== Electoral system ==
The Governor of Enugu State is elected using the plurality voting system.

== Primary election ==
=== PDP primary ===
The PDP primary election was won by Chimaroke Nnamani.

== Results ==
The total number of registered voters in the state was 1,466,472. Total number of votes cast was 845,320, while number of valid votes was 842,415. Rejected votes were 3,005.

Candidate	Party	Votes	%
Adebayo	People's Democratic Party	602,960	71.96
All People's Party	235,000	28.04	
Total		837,960	100.00
Valid votes		837,960	99.64
Invalid/blank votes		3,005	0.36
Total votes		840,965	100.00
Registered voters/turnout		1,466,472	57.35
Source: Nigeria World, IFES, Semantics Scholar
