= Ajebo =

Nigerian comedian

- Born: Erem Emeka Nehemiah; 16 May 1987 (age 39); Lagos State, Nigeria
- Education: University of Nigeria, Nsukka

Comedy career
- Years active: 2013–present
- Medium: Stand-up; television; music
- Genres: Animated comedy; satire
- Subjects: Nigerian culture; everyday life; Popular culture; current events

Erem Emeka Nehemiah (born 16 May 1987), widely known by his stage name Ajebo, is a Nigerian comedian and animator. He is the founder of House of Ajebo Animation Studios also known as House Of Ajebo. They have made the comic character Tegwolo, and the children's educational entertainment platform Jeni and Keni. He is also the host of the comedy show, Ajebo Unleashed.

== Early life and education ==
Nehemiah was born and raised in Surulere, Lagos, Nigeria. He developed a passion for comedy and storytelling at an early age. He attended the Nigerian Navy Secondary School, Abeokuta and finished in 2004. He proceeded to attend the University of Nigeria, Nsukka, where he studied Mass Communication between 2006 and 2010.

He started to do comedy in Secondary School and University. He later earned a master's degree in Mass Communication in 2016 at The University of Lagos.

== Career ==
Nehemiah's first paid event was hosting a wedding at 14 years old. At his early stage he got support from his parents; his mom paid him stipends for every free gig he performed to encourage him.

He changed his stage name from MCErem to Ajebo due to other comedians nicknamed him "Ajebo", a Nigerian slang used to describe someone born into wealth.

He started working with NaijaFM, Lagos in 2011, and in 2016, he resigned to fully run his animation production startup.

Nehemiah is the creator of the Tegwolo cartoon.

== Impact ==
In 2024, CNN featured his projects on its program African Voices change makers, highlighting his efforts to redefine African storytelling through animation and humor.

== Awards and nominations ==
Award	Year	Recipient(s)	Category	Result	Ref.
Nigerian Entertainment Awards	2014	Himself	Funniest comedian of the year	Nominated	
City People Entertainment Awards	2014	Himself	Award of Special Recognition	Won	

== Personal life ==
Ajebo married Uchenna Kalu in 2018, and they currently have three children.
