= Kayode Adewale =

Kayode Abayomi Adewale is a Nigerian educator and researcher known for using native languages to breakdown complex English mathematical formulas and information and communication technology (ICT) concepts to teach students in rural areas. He was a Top 50 Finalist in the 2025 GEMS Global Teacher Prize and was President's Teachers and Schools Excellence Award 2nd runner-up for Best Teacher in Nigeria 2023. He is the first education ambassador of Ogun State appointed by the governor of the state.

== Education ==
Adewale received primary education at Imososi Methodist Primary School, Ago Iwoye and secondary school at Abobi Comprehensive High School, Ago Iwoye, Ogun State. He earned Nigeria Certificate in Education, NCE in Mathematics and Economics from Tai Solarin College of Education and Bachelor of Science in education, B.Sc. (Ed) from Tai Solarin University of Education (TASUED) in 2012. He obtained a Master of Education, M.Ed. in Educational Evaluation (2015) and a Ph.D. in Educational Evaluation both from (TASUED). He received the Fulbright Teaching Excellence and Achievement Program (Fulbright TEA) Fellow at Kent State University, Ohio in 2023 and Limitless Global Educator Fellowship at Limitless Space Institute, Houston, Texas, USA in 2024.

== Career ==
Adewale spent his early teaching career in rural community schools in Ogun State including at Imagbon/Imaka Comprehensive High School where he taught Mathematics and Information and Communication Technology (ICT). He incorporated mother's tongue such as Yoruba language in his teaching to simplify complex English mathematical and information and communication technology concepts for rural students who are not proficient in the English language - the official language of teaching in schools in Nigeria.

He emerged 2nd runner-up in the President's Teachers and Schools Excellence Award for Best Teacher in Nigeria 2023. In 2025, Adewale was named in the Top 50 Finalist in the 2025 GEMS Global Teacher Prize – a $1m dollar prize given by Varkey Foundation in partnership with UNESCO. Following the GEMS Teacher Prize finalist nomination, his alma mater, Tai Solarin University of Education offered him automatic full-time employment as a lecturer and was appointed the first Education Ambassador of Ogun State with a cash prize of N5m and a bungalow by Governor Dapo Abiodun in 2025.
