= Uwais =

Uwais is both a given name and a surname. Notable people with the name include:

- Uwais Khan, Mongol khan
- Iko Uwais (born 1983), Indonesian actor
- Mohammed Uwais (1936–2025), Nigerian jurist
