= 1999 Ogun State gubernatorial election =

1999 gubernatorial election in Ogun State, Nigeria

- January 9, 1999
Nominee	Olusegun Osoba
Party	AD	PDP
Popular vote	247,154	122,139
Governor before election
Olusegun Osoba
SDP
Elected Governor
Olusegun Osoba
AD

The 1999 Ogun State gubernatorial election occurred in Nigeria on January 9, 1999. The AD nominee Olusegun Osoba won the election defeating the PDP candidate.

Olusegun Osoba emerged AD candidate.

== Electoral system ==
The Governor of Ogun State is elected using the plurality voting system.

== Primary election ==
=== AD primary ===
The AD primary election was won by Olusegun Osoba.

== Results ==
The total number of registered voters in the state was 1,592,502. Total number of votes cast was 403,260 while number of valid votes was 391,395. Rejected votes were 11,865.

Candidate	Party	Votes	%
Olusegun Osoba	AD	247,154	66.93
People's Democratic Party	122,139	33.07	
Total		369,293	100.00
Valid votes		369,293	96.89
Invalid/blank votes		11,865	3.11
Total votes		381,158	100.00
Registered voters/turnout		1,592,502	23.93
Source: Nigeria World, IFES, Semantics Scholar
