= Seyi Lawal =

Nigerian politician

Hon. Prince Seyi Lawal

Member, Lagos State House of Assembly
- Incumbent
- Assumed office 2023
- Constituency: Ikeja Constituency I

Personal details
- Born: 1972 (age 53–54) Lagos State, Nigeria
- Party: All Progressives Congress (APC)
- Education: Tai Solarin University of Education (B.A. Ed)
- Occupation: Politician
- Website: Lagos Assembly Profile

Prince Seyi Lawal (born 1972), also known as Adeseyi Lawal, is a Nigerian politician who currently serves as a member of the Lagos State House of Assembly, representing Ikeja Constituency I.

== Early life and education ==
Seyi Lawal was born in 1972. He began his education at Olososun Primary School before proceeding to Ejigbo High School for his secondary education. He holds a Diploma in Air Travel Studies from the Dayrem Institute of Professional Studies. He later obtained a Bachelor of Arts in Education (B.A. Ed.) in History and Diplomatic Studies from Tai Solarin University of Education (TASUED).

== Political career ==
Lawal's political journey began in 1998 as a youth member of the Alliance for Democracy (AD). He served as the Publicity Secretary of the Alliance for Democracy in Ward C, Ikeja.

In the 2023 general elections, Lawal contested for the Ikeja Constituency I seat in the Lagos State House of Assembly and was elected on the platform of the All Progressives Congress (APC). Upon his inauguration into the 10th Assembly, he was appointed as the Chairman of the House Committee on Science and Technology. In this role, he oversees the state's digital initiatives and policies related to technological advancement.
