= NNSS =

NNSS may refer to:

- Navy Navigation Satellite System
- Nigerian Navy Secondary School
- Nevada National Security Site
- Nach-Noten-Schluss-Syndrom
