= 2003 Kwara State gubernatorial election =

2003 gubernatorial election in Kwara State, Nigeria

- April 19, 2003
Nominee	Bukola Saraki	Mohammed Lawal
Party	PDP	ANPP
Running mate	Joen Afolabi Ogundeji	Simeon A.S.
Popular vote	322,242	199,855
Governor before election
Mohammed Lawal
ANPP
Elected Governor
Bukola Saraki
PDP

The 2003 Kwara State gubernatorial election occurred in Nigeria on April 19, 2003. The PDP nominee Bukola Saraki won the election, defeating Mohammed Lawal of the All Nigeria Peoples Party.

Bukola Saraki emerged PDP candidate. He picked Joen Afolabi Ogundeji as his running mate. Mohammed Lawal was the ANPP candidate with Simeon A.S. as his running mate.

== Electoral system ==
The Governor of Kwara State is elected using the plurality voting system.

== Primary election ==
=== PDP primary ===
The PDP primary election was won by Bukola Saraki. He picked Joen Afolabi Ogundeji as his running mate.

=== ANPP primary ===
The ANPP primary election was won by Mohammed Lawal. He picked Simeon A.S. as his running mate.

== Results ==
A total number of 8 candidates registered with the Independent National Electoral Commission to contest in the election.

The total number of registered voters in the state was 995,882. Total number of votes cast was 628,020, while number of valid votes was 589,940. Rejected votes were 38,080.

Candidate	Party	Votes	%
Bukola Saraki	People's Democratic Party	322,242	61.72
Mohammed Lawal	All Nigeria Peoples Party	199,855	38.28
Total		522,097	100.00
Valid votes		522,097	93.20
Invalid/blank votes		38,080	6.80
Total votes		560,177	100.00
Registered voters/turnout		995,882	56.25
Source: CCSU
