= Harris Eghagha =

Brigadier General Harris Eghagha

Governor of Ogun State
- In office July 1978 – October 1979
- Preceded by: Saidu Ayodele Balogun
- Succeeded by: Olabisi Onabanjo

Personal details
- Born: 8 March 1934 Okpe, Southern Region, British Nigeria (now in Delta State, Nigeria)
- Died: 19 March 2009 (aged 75)

Military service
- Allegiance: Nigeria
- Branch/service: Nigerian Army
- Rank: Brigadier General

Harris Otadafevwerha Deodemise Eghagha (8 March 1934 – 19 March 2009) was a Nigerian general who was appointed military governor of Ogun State from July 1978 to October 1979 during the military regime of General Olusegun Obasanjo, handing over power to the elected governor, Olabisi Onabanjo, at the start of the Nigerian Second Republic.

Eghagha was born on 8 March 1934 in Mereje, Okpe Local Government Area, Urhoboland, Delta State.

Eghagha played a minor role in the January 1966 coup that overthrew the Nigerian First Republic and brought in the military regime of Major-General Johnson Aguiyi-Ironsi, as a second lieutenant in charge of a roadblock in Kaduna. His achievements as governor of Ogun State included building the legislative quarters and the road network in Abeokuta, the state capital. He built and commissioned the Ogun State Hotel, Abeokuta, established industrial estates throughout the state and founded the Ogun State Polytechnic (now Moshood Abiola Polytechnic) in Abeokuta. He also served as Acting Governor of Sokoto and Kwara States, and was Nigeria's High Commissioner to Ghana.

Eghagha died at the Lagos University Teaching Hospital on 19 March 2009, at the age of 75.
