= Samuel Ekundayo Oladipo =

Nigerian Professor of Psychology and Researcher

Personal details
- Born: 29 June 1969 (age 57) Oyo state
- Spouse: Christianah P. Oladipo
- Parent(s): Mr and Mrs Amos Oladipo
- Occupation: Professor of Psychology and Researcher
- Website: https://profoladipo.com/

Samuel Ekundayo Oladipo (born June 29th 1969) is a Nigerian Professor of Psychology and Researcher, who has been currently appointed as a Vice Chancellor at Tai Solarin Federal University of Education (TASFUED) in Ogun state, Nigeria

== Early life and education ==
Prof. Oladipo was born into a family of the late Mr. and Mrs Amos Oladipo of Oyo state, Nigeria. He holds Postgraduate Diploma in Education from Olabisi Onabanjo University in Ogun state, Msc in Clinical Psychology from University of Ibadan and PhD in Personality and Social Psychology from University of Ibadan too.

== Career ==
Before the current appointment as a Vice Chancellor at Tai Solarin Federal University of Education (TASFUED), Prof. Oladipo served this university at different positions like Pioneer Director of Directorate of Research and External Relations (DRER), Counselling Psychology, Lecturer and many other positions.

Prof. Oladipo is also a member of professional bodies like American Psychological Association, Psychological Association of Nigeria, Nigeria Social Psychology Association, Counselling Psychology Association of Nigeria, and African Scientist Organisation.

== Personal life ==
Prof. Oladipo is married to Mrs. Christianah P. Oladipo. He is also a pastor and a teacher.

== Publications ==
- Oladipo, S.E. (2006) Essentials of Clinical Psychology. Freedom Press & Publishers, Ibadan
- Oladipo, S.E. (2006) Help Text for Student Counsellors. Freedom Press & Publishers, Ibadan.
- Hassan, A.M; Oladipo, S.E. and Owoyele, J.O. (2008). Readings in Counselling Psychology.
- Journal of Human Behavior in the Social Environment 2021.
- Psychological Empowerment and Development journal article
