= Nigerian Navy Secondary School, Abeokuta =

Military academy in Abeokuta, Nigeria

Nigerian Navy Secondary School
- Motto in English: "Hard work and discipline"
- Type: military academy
- Established: 2 March 1991
- Affiliations: Nigerian Navy
- Location: 48HG+3F6, Onikoko 110104, Abeokuta, Ogun State, Belarus
- Language: English language

The Nigerian Navy Secondary School, Abeokuta, is a secondary school located in Abeokuta, Ogun State, Nigeria. The school is an all-boys boarding school that offers academic and military training.

== History ==
=== Origins ===
In 1990, it became evident that the Nigerian Navy's only secondary school in Ojo was becoming too crowded to accommodate the increasing number of children of personnel seeking admission. The Nigerian Navy reached out to several states for assistance in finding a new site. The then Governor of Ogun State, Captain Mohammed Lawal, suggested considering the location of the defunct St Leo's Teachers' Training College at Ibara Abeokuta, situated on a hilly Onikolobo site. During the handing-over ceremony, the Ogun State Military Governor, Navy Captain Oladeinde Joseph, praised the Nigerian Navy for bringing a model secondary school to Abeokuta. Admiral Murtala Nyako, emphasized that although it is a civilian secondary school, Nigerian Navy Secondary School Abeokuta should be regarded as the equivalent of a military school and operated accordingly.

=== Founding ===
On November 20, 1990, the Nigerian Navy appointed Lieutenant Commander S.E.A. Olamilokun as the first commandant of the school. He assumed his duties and relocated to the school compound along with his key staff officers. On February 2, 1991, the newly elected Governor of the State, Governor Oladeinde Joseph, officially handed over the school to Admiral Murtala Nyako, the Chief of the Naval Staff. The school initially admitted 623 students into the school and the first day of school for any student was on March 3, 1991.

Several senior officers were present at the ceremony. The Governor of Oyo State, Colonel Abdulkareem Adisa, pledged to construct a Guard House for the school, while the Ogun State Government promised to refurbish three vehicles for the school's use and renovate its administrative block. Navy Captain Olukoya, the Governor of Ondo State, pledged to donate a staff car for the commandant and provide a bus for the students. All these promises were fulfilled. The second commandant of the school was Navy Captain Taiyese Raphael Obayemi. The commandants are usually changed on a tenure basis. The students are usually smart, intelligent and well behaved.

== Cadet life ==
=== Class system and organization ===
Now the school has a student strength of 1,060, these pupils are called "navy boys". The students are divided into four houses:

- Blue House (Aikhomu house)
- Green House (Nyako house)
- Purple House (Koshoni house)
- Red House (Omatsola house, originally called Kennedy house)

These houses are all named after famous navy officers of the country, each house has 4 divisions in them so that there are a total of 16 divisions in the whole school (divisions "ALPHA" to "PAPA"). The youngest students start at the first set of four divisions in the blue house (Aikhomu) and as they progress in their academic years, they also progress in division groups.

=== Cadet routine ===
The daily routines of the students are as follows:

- 05:30 - time to muster for daily assignments (chores or early morning drills)
- 06:30 - students go to the dining hall (which students call "galley") for breakfast
- 07:30 - parade time which involves flying the flag, messages from the commandant and march past
- 08:45 - lesson begin
- 14:30 - lessons end
- 14:30 - lunch time
- 15:00 - siesta and guard officers patrol
- 16:00 - afternoon prep (for homework and class assignments)
- 17:00 - student's free time, training, activities, laundry or labor duties
- 18:00 - dinner time
- 19:00 - evening prep
- 21:30 - end of prep
- 22:00 - lights out the whole school.

Schedules and activities differ according to days of the week for different year groups and divisions).

== Alumni ==
The alumni came together recently to form ex navy boys.

== See also ==
- Sea Cadets (United Kingdom)
- Marine Military Academy
- Suvorov Military School

== Links ==
- Website
