= Adebayo =

- Gender: Male
- Language: Yoruba

Origin
- Origin: Yorubaland
- Meaning: greatness/nobility/primacy/power enjoined with joy
- Region of origin: Yorubaland [Nigeria, Benin, Togo]

Adébáyọ̀ audio or Adebayor in French, is a given name and surname. It is a traditional Yoruba name which could mean any of the following “he came in a joyful time”, or "the king/crown/royalty meets joy" or "greatness/nobility/primacy/power enjoined with joy".

== Notable individuals with the name ==
=== Surname ===
- Adedayo Adebayo (born 1970), English rugby player of Nigerian descent
- Adewole Adebayo (born 1972), Nigerian lawyer
- Ayobami Adebayo (born 1988), Nigerian writer
- Bam Adebayo (born 1997), American professional basketball player
- Bo Adebayo (born 1988), Canadian football defensive lineman
- Cornelius Adebayo (1941–2025), Nigerian politician and government official
- Diran Adebayo (born 1968), British novelist, critic and broadcaster
- Dotun Adebayo (born 1960), British radio presenter
- Elijah Adebayo (born 1998), English footballer
- Emmanuel Adebayor (born 1984), Togolese footballer
- Femi Adebayo (born 1972), Nigerian lawyer, actor, director and producer
- Niyi Adebayo (born 1958), Nigerian governor, 1999-2003 current Minister of Trade, Industry & Investment for Nigeria (2019-date)
- Robert Adeyinka Adebayo (1928–2017), Nigerian Army major general, governor of Western State of Nigeria, 1966–1971
- Sunday Adebayo (born 1973), Nigerian professional basketball player
- Whitney Adebayo (born 1997), English television personality

=== Given name ===
- Adebayo Adedeji (1930–2018), Nigerian economist and academic
- Adebayo Adefarati (1931–2007), Nigerian politician
- Adebayo Adelabu (born 1970), Nigerian politician
- Adebayo Adeleye (born 2000), Nigerian football goalkeeper
- Adebayo Adewusi (born 1958), Nigerian academic, lawyer, public administrator, and politician
- Adebayo Adigun (born 1990), Nigerian footballer
- Adebayo Akinde (born 1946), Nigerian academic and bishop
- Bayo Akinfemi (born 1969), Nigerian actor and director
- Adebayo Akinfenwa (born 1982), English footballer
- Adebayo Alao-Akala (1950–2022), Nigerian politician
- Adebayo Alonge, Nigerian pharmacist, inventor, deep tech entrepreneur, and market development professional
- Adebayo Johnson Bankole (born 1945), Nigerian politician
- Adebayo Bolaji (born 1983), English painter, actor, writer, and director
- Adebayo Faleti (1921–2017), Nigerian newscaster, stage director, film editor, and librarian
- Adebayo Gbadebo (born 1974), Nigerian footballer and manager
- Adebayo Lawal (born 1941), Nigerian politician
- Adebayo Ogunlesi (born 1953), Nigerian lawyer and investment banker
- Adebayo Oladapo (born 1940), Nigerian sprinter
- Adebayo Osinowo (1955–2020), Nigerian businessman and politician, also known as Pepper
- Adebayo Salami (1951–2021), Nigerian politician
- Adebayo Salami (born 1952), Nigerian actor, filmmaker, movie producer, and director, known professionally as Oga Bello

=== Compound name ===
- Marsha Coleman-Adebayo
