= 1999 Kwara State gubernatorial election =

1999 gubernatorial election in Kwara State, Nigeria

- January 9, 1999
Nominee	Mohammed Lawal	Muhammed Alimi Abdulrazaq
Party	All People's Party (Nigeria)	PDP
Popular vote	283,136	174,205
Governor before election
Mohammed Shaaba Lafiagi
SDP
Elected Governor
Mohammed Lawal
All People's Party (Nigeria)

The 1999 Kwara State gubernatorial election was held in Nigeria on January 9, 1999. The APP nominee Mohammed Lawal won the election, defeating the PDP candidate.

Mohammed Lawal emerged as the APP candidate.

== Electoral system ==
The Governor of Kwara State is elected using the plurality voting system.

== Primary election ==
=== APP primary ===
Mohammed Lawal won the APP primary election.

== Results ==
The total number of registered voters in the state was 940,425. Total number of votes cast was 585,468 while number of valid votes was 567,568. Rejected votes were 17,900.

Candidate	Party	Votes	%
Mohammed Lawal	All People's Party	283,136	61.91
People's Democratic Party	174,205	38.09	
Total		457,341	100.00
Valid votes		457,341	96.23
Invalid/blank votes		17,900	3.77
Total votes		475,241	100.00
Registered voters/turnout		940,425	50.53
Source: Nigeria World, IFES, Semantics Scholar
