= Oladeinde Joseph =

Military governor 1990–1992

Rear Admiral Oladeinde Joseph

Military Governor of Ogun State
- In office August 1990 – January 1992
- Preceded by: Mohammed Lawal
- Succeeded by: Segun Osoba

Personal details
- Born: 1948 (age 77–78)

Military service
- Allegiance: Nigeria
- Branch/service: Nigerian Navy
- Rank: Rear Admiral

Oladeinde Olusoga Joseph (born 1948) is a Nigerian Navy admiral who was military governor of Ogun State, Nigeria between August 1990 and January 1992 during the military administration of General Ibrahim Babangida, handing over power to the elected civilian governor Segun Osoba.

He was instrumental in establishing the Nigerian Navy Secondary School, Abeokuta. Other construction in Abeokuta during his administration included the South-West Resource Centre and the Abeokuta Golf Course.
