= Daniel Akintonde =

Nigerian politician

Administrator of Ogun State
- In office 9 December 1993 – 22 August 1996
- Preceded by: Olusegun Osoba
- Succeeded by: Sam Ewang

Colonel Daniel Akintonde (born November 21, 1949) in Plateau State. He hails from Ogbomoso, in Oyo State. He was appointed Military Governor of Ogun State, Nigeria from December 1993 to August 1996 during the military regime of General Sani Abacha.

In 1994 Akintonde renamed the Ogun State College of Education to the Tai Solarin College of Education in honor of the late doctor Tai Solarin. Akintonde was among those arrested for involvement in the December 1997 alleged coup. He was cleared of the charges on 20 April 1998.

He was retired from the military in June 1999, along with all officers who had served as ministers, governors or administrators during the Babangida, Abacha and Abubakar regimes. In August 1999 the Ogun State House of Assembly summoned Akintonde to answer questions about some contracts awarded during his tenure. Reporters were barred from the hearing.
