= Tegwolo =

Nigerian cartoon character

- Tegwolo Series character
- First appearance: House of Ajebo comics (2016)
- Created by: Ajebo
- Designed by: House of Ajebo
- Voiced by: Ajebo

In-universe information
- Alias: Champion of Warri
- Species: Human
- Gender: Male
- Nationality: Nigerian

Tegwolo is a Nigerian cartoon character created by Ajebo in 2016. He is known for his antics, outlook on life, and personality.

Tegwolo first appeared in the House of Ajebo comics released in 2016. He has been featured in Tegwolo Series on YouTube and the Tegwolo Dash mobile game.

== Biography ==
Tegwolo is a nine-year-old boy from Warri, Delta State. He is depicted as an energetic child who was born to an Igbo mother and a Warri father from a low-income family. His adventures often revolve around his school experiences, interactions with his mother, siblings, tactics and his best friend, Tega.

== Tegwolo series ==
Tegwolo: Champion of Warri is composed of short animated episodes that portray the title character's humorous encounters in everyday Warri settings. Set in Warri, Delta State, the series reflects local street wit, sharp comebacks, and confidence. It incorporates themes of family life, childhood mischief, and cultural expression relatable to African audiences.

== Production and development ==
Tegwolo: Champion of Warri is produced by House of Ajebo, a Nigerian digital media company known for animated comedy content. The character Tegwolo was created by Nigerian comedian Ajebo, who also provides the character’s voice. According to publicly available information, Tegwolo first appeared in House of Ajebo–related content in the mid-2010s. Ajebo has also created other animated characters for the platform.

== Cultural impact ==
Tegwolo has been mentioned in Nigerian media and on social media platforms and has been referenced in online memes. The character's distinctive appearance and comedic mannerisms are frequently referenced across digital platforms.

The Tegwolo series was listed among Nigeria’s trending YouTube videos in 2022.

In October 2024, Tegwolo was featured in African Voices Changemakers, a CNN program highlighting African content creators using animation for cultural education. The character was also featured on TVC News in February 2024.
