= Ogun State College of Health Technology =

State college in Ogun State, Nigeria

Ogun State Polytechnic of Health and Allied Sciences
- Former name: Ogun State School of Health Technology
- Type: Public
- Established: 1976
- Founder: Saidu Ayodele Balogun
- Affiliations: National Board for Technical Education, Kwara State University
- Provost: Mrs Badmus Muinat Abisola
- Location: Ilese, Ijebu Ode, Ogun, Nigeria; 6.8012452°N 3.9509314°E
- Language: English
- Website: http://www.oscohtechilese.edu.ng/

Ogun State Polytechnic of Health and Allied Sciences is a training polytechnic for health care in Ilese-Ijebu, Ogun State, Nigeria. It was the first state college established in Ogun State. As well as providing health technology training and certification, it is a major factor in both increasing the population and enhancing the status of Ilese, a town on the outskirts of Ijebu Ode. The college was established in 1976 and offers courses at diploma, Higher National Diploma, and degree levels.

== History ==
The college was established on 28 September 1976 as a school under a department in the Ministry of Health during the military administration of Saidu Balogun. At inception, the institution was located temporarily at Itamogiri in Ijebu East local government area in 1982. The primary objective of the college is to train the middle level for the delivery of primary healthcare services for the state. The college has since surpassed this mandate by providing quality healthcare workers for primary, secondary, and tertiary healthcare delivery systems not only for Ogun State but also for neighboring states and federal institutions.

Being the first tertiary institution in the state, its general importance to the overall primary healthcare delivery in the state, as well as being the single largest producer of primary healthcare workers accounting for over ninety percent (90%) of the total health manpower needs of the twenty local governments in the state; the impact of its contribution to primary health care spurred the state government to upgrade it to a college with polytechnic status. The required legislation, House Bill Number 27, was enacted and signed by the then-governor of the state. The law is cited as Ogun State College of Health Technology Law, 2004 as amended in 2008.

== Location ==
The college occupies a wide expanse of land from Ilese township road, almost reaching the Sagamu-Benin express road. This gives ample room for expansion and development.

As of April 2012, Ogun State College of Health Technology had approved the private Royal Institute of Health Technology, Ifo in Arigbajo- Ifo, Ogun State to run some accredited courses. This provides access to recognized studies that would not otherwise be accessible by people in that region.

== Academics ==
As well as 11 programmes approved by the National Board for Technical Education (NBTE) and national professional organizations at diploma and Higher National Diploma levels, the college can award degrees accredited by Kwara State University. Degree courses are available in environmental health, medical laboratory sciences, health information management, and other health technology fields.
