= 2003 Enugu State gubernatorial election =

2003 gubernatorial election in Enugu State, Nigeria

- April 19, 2003
Nominee	Chimaroke Nnamani	Onu Solomon
Party	People's Democratic Party (Nigeria)	NRP
Running mate	Okechukwu Ezewata Itanyi	Walter Obiorah Oji
Popular vote	1,072,173	59,144
Governor before election
Chimaroke Nnamani
People's Democratic Party (Nigeria)
Elected Governor
Chimaroke Nnamani
People's Democratic Party (Nigeria)

The 2003 Enugu State gubernatorial election occurred in Nigeria on April 19, 2003. The PDP nominee Chimaroke Nnamani won the election, defeating Onu Solomon of the NRP.

Chimaroke Nnamani emerged PDP candidate. He picked Okechukwu Ezewata Itanyi as his running mate. Onu Solomon was the NRP candidate with Walter Obiorah Oji as his running mate.

== Electoral system ==
The Governor of Enugu State is elected using the plurality voting system.

== Primary election ==
=== PDP primary ===
The PDP primary election was won by Chimaroke Nnamani. He picked Okechukwu Ezewata Itanyi as his running mate.

=== NRP primary ===
The NRP primary election was won by Onu Solomon. He picked Walter Obiorah Oji as his running mate.

== Results ==
A total number of 13 candidates registered with the Independent National Electoral Commission to contest in the election.

The total number of registered voters in the state was 1,479,542. Total number of votes cast was 1,215,809, while number of valid votes was 1,207,114. Rejected votes were 8,695.

Candidate	Party	Votes	%
Chimaroke Nnamani	People's Democratic Party	1,072,173	94.77
Onu Solomon	National Reformation Party	59,144	5.23
Total		1,131,317	100.00
Valid votes		1,131,317	99.24
Invalid/blank votes		8,695	0.76
Total votes		1,140,012	100.00
Registered voters/turnout		1,479,542	77.05
Source: CCSU
