= Adekunle Adeogun =

Vice Chancellor of Tai Solarin Federal University of Education

Adekunle Olanrewaju Adeogun
- Born: Abeokuta, Ogun State, Nigeria
- Occupations: Academic, university administrator
- Years active: 1999–present
- Organization: Tai Solarin University of Education
- Title: Professor

Academic background
- Education: Divisional Teachers College, Ayetoro, Ogun State College of Education, University of Port Harcourt, Olabisi Onabanjo University, University of Ibadan

Academic work
- Discipline: Public Health Education
- Institutions: Tai Solarin University of Education
- Main interests: Health Promotion, Public Health Education
- Notable works: 15th Inaugural Lecture, TASUED (2023)

Adekunle Olanrewaju Adeogun is a Nigerian professor of public health education and the acting vice-chancellor of Tai Solarin University of Education (TASUED). He was appointed in October 2025.

== Early life and education ==
Adeogun was born in Abeokuta, Ogun State, Nigeria. He attended Methodist Primary School in Ogbe, Abeokuta, for his primary education and Macjob School of Commerce in Onikolobo, Abeokuta, for his secondary education. He obtained a Teachers Grade Two Certificate from Divisional Teachers College in Ayetoro. Adeogun earned his Nigeria Certificate in Education (NCE) from the then Ogun State College of Education in 1990.

He received a bachelor's degree in education from the University of Port Harcourt in 1995, a Master of Education (M.Ed.) from Olabisi Onabanjo University (formerly Ogun State University) in Ago Iwoye in 2003, and a Ph.D. from the University of Ibadan in 2008. He progressed through the academic ranks and was promoted to professor on 1 October 2016.

== Academic career ==
Adeogun began his lecturing career on 1 October 1999 as a Lecturer III at the then Ogun State College of Education in Ijebu-Ode, which later became Tai Solarin University of Education (TASUED). Before his Vice Chancellor appointment, Adeogun served as Dean of the College of Science and Information Technology (COSIT) at TASUED. He was appointed as the fifth deputy vice-chancellor of the university.

On 22 October 2025, the Governing Council of TASUED appointed Adeogun as acting vice-chancellor during an emergency meeting, with the appointment taking effect on 4 November 2025, following the completion of the tenure of the outgoing vice-chancellor, Professor Oluwole Banjo.

== Selected publications ==
- Adeyi, Akindele Oluwatosin; Ajisebiola, Babafemi Siji; Adeyi, Olubisi Esther; Adekunle, Olarewaju; Akande, Olanike Busirat; James, Adewale Segun; Ajayi, Babajide O.; Yusuf, Peter Ofemile; Idowu, Babatunde A. (2021). "Moringa oleifera leaf fractions attenuated Naje haje venom-induced cellular dysfunctions via modulation of Nrf2 and inflammatory signalling pathways in rats". Biochemistry and Biophysics Reports. 25 100890. doi:10.1016/j.bbrep.2020.100890. PMC 7820385. PMID 33521334.
