= Kayode Olofin-Moyin =

Nigerian politician and navy

Administrator of Ogun State
- In office 22 August 1998 – August 1999
- Preceded by: Sam Ewang
- Succeeded by: Olusegun Osoba

Kayode Olofin-Moyin is a Nigerian politician and navy officer.

== Early life ==
Navy Captain Kayode Olofin-moyin was born in Ilawe-Ekiti, Ekiti State, on May 13, 1950.

== Education ==
After his elementary education, he enrolled at the Annunciation Catholic School, Ikere-Ekiti in 1965. He passed out in 1969 with the West African School Certificate in flying colours.

He was admitted into the Nigerian Defence Academy in 1971 as a cadet and successfully completed his course in December 1972 and got commissioned into the Nigerian Navy. Thereafter, in quick succession, he went through further trainings. He had hardly left the Nigerian Defence Academy in December 1972, when he started a course in Midshipman onboard NNS OBUMA (formerly NNS NIGERIA). He completed his training in October 1973

== Military career ==
An officer whose thirst for knowledge could be described as insatiable, Navy Captain Olofin-Moyin proceeded to the prestigious Command and Staff College, Jaji in 1985, graduated in 1986. He later attended the National War College, Abuja, between 1997 and 1998.

Navy Captain Olofin-Moyin rose steadily in his chosen career. From a Cadet in 1972, he was promoted Midshipman in 1973; Sub-Lieutenant (1973 – 1977); Lieutenant (1977 – 1981); Lieutenant Commander (1981 – 1988); Commander (1988 – 1994) and Navy Captain (1994)

Some of his Command appointments were, Commanding Officer, NNS HADEJIA (Patrol Boat), (1978 – 1979); Commanding Officer, NNS RUWAN YARO (Cadets Training Ship), (1984 – 1985); Commanding Officer, NNS ENYIMIRI (A Corvette on ECOMOG Operation), Liberia, (1992 – 1993) and Commanding Officer, Naval Air Station, (1996 – 1997).

Navy Captain Olofin-Moyin also held Staff appointments such as Staff Officer (Operation), Western Naval Command (1986 – 1988); Base Commander, Nigerian Naval College, Onura, Port Hacourt (1990 – 1992); Naval Chief Officer, ECOMOG, Liberia (1994 – 1995) and Director of Operations, Naval Headquarters, Lagos (1995 – 1996).

== Ogun State Administrator ==
Navy Captain Kayode Olofin-Moyin was appointed Military Administrator of Ogun State, Nigeria from August 1998 to May 1999 during the transitional regime of General Abdulsalami Abubakar, handing over power to the elected governor Olusegun Osoba at the start of the Nigerian Fourth Republic. He built a new Governors Lodge for Ogun State, opened on 27 April 1999 just before the handover to the civilian governor.

In November 2002 his house in Victoria Island, Lagos was gutted and destroyed by fire.
