= Udi Hills =

Hills located in Nigeria

The Udi Hills, or Ugwueme is located in the Igbo-Eze North Local Government Area of Enugu State, Nigeria. These hills rise hundreds of meters above sea level.

== History ==
In 1908, the Udi Hills attracted a British expedition team from Awka to the Middle Belt, and in 1909, the British colonial government to Nigeria sent a team of mining engineers to Enugu to prospect for silver. Once there, they settled in Ngwo at the top of the hill Milliken Hill after discovering coal. On its slope to the south they set up another settlement for African laborers known as Alfred Camp or Ugwu Alfred. In 1915, Udi Hills was the site for the Udi mine which was the first coal mine to be opened in Nigeria, but was closed two years later and replaced with the Iva Valley mine.

== Tourism ==
Udi Hills is one of Enugu State's top tourist attractions. Surrounded by granite and sandstone boulders, Udi Hills is over 200 meters above sea level. It is an ideal spot for climbers as it also offers a beautiful view of Enugu city's landscape.
