= Nigerian Medical Students' Association =

Non profit Student Organization

- Abbreviation: NiMSA
- Formation: 1968
- Type: Student Organisation; Non-Profit Organisation
- Purpose: Representation of the Nigerian Medical Students Association at the Local, National and International Level
- Headquarters: Abuja, Nigeria
- Official language: English
- President: Femi–Adeniyi Oladapo (the 49th President)
- Parent organization: Nigerian Medical Association
- Affiliations: International Federation of Medical Students' Associations
- Website: nimsa.ng

The Nigerian Medical Students' Association (NiMSA) is the official umbrella organization of all medical students studying in recognized medical schools in Nigeria, irrespective of their nationalities. It is the official student arm of the Nigerian Medical Association (NMA) (Act Cap 221 Laws of the Federation of Nigeria).

== History ==
In 1968, a group of students founded NiMSA to represent Nigerian medical students in Nigeria and the diaspora, bringing the Nigerian medical students together as one body to discuss ideas, share information, and voice opinions and concerns. Since then, the Nigerian Medical Students Association has grown and evolved into a student-representative body. NiMSA has full membership status with the International Federation of Medical Students' Associations (IFMSA).

== Member schools ==
Region	Name Of Institution	Acronym
North Central	University Of Ilorin Medical Students Association	(ILUMSA)
	Benue State University Medical Students Association	(BESUMSA)
	Kwara State University Medical Students Association	(KWASUMSA)
	Jos University Medical Students Association	(JUMSA)
	University of Abuja Medical Students Association	(UAMSA)
	Bingham University Medical Students Association	(BHUMSA)
North West	Usman Danfodio University Medical Students Association	(UDUMS
	Ahmadu Bello University Medical Students Association	(ABUMSA)
	Kaduna State University Medical Students Association	(KASUMSA)
	Federal University Dutse Medical students' Association	(FUDUMSA)
	Bayero University Medical Students Association	(BUMSA)
	Federal University Birnin Kebbi Medical students’ association	(FUBIMSA)
North East	University of Maiduguri Medical Students Association	(UMMESA)
	Gombe State University Medical Students Association	(GSUMSA)
	Abubakar Tafawa Balewa Medical Students Association	(ATBUMSA)
	Yobe State University Medical Students Association	(YOSUMSA)
South West	Olabisi Onabanjo University Medical Students Association	(OOUMSA)
	Osun State University Medical Student Association	(OSUMSA)
	Babcock University Association of Medical Students	(BUAMS)
	Lagos State University Medical Students Association	(LASUMSA)
	Association of Medical Students in University of Lagos	(AMSUL)
	University of Ibadan Medical Students Association	(UIMSA)
	Obafemi Awolowo University Medical Students Association	(IFUMSA)
	Bowen University Medical Students Association	(BAMS)
	Ladoke Akintola University Medical Students Association	(LAUMSA)
	Afe Babalola University Medical Students Association	(AMSA)
	Ekiti State University Medical Students Association	(EKSUMSA)
South East	Abia State University Medical Students Association	(ABSUMSA)
	Nnamdi Azikwe Medical Students Association	(NAUMSA)
	Ebonyi State University Medical Students Association	(EBSUMSA)
	University of Nigeria Medical Students Association	(UNMSA)
	Enugu State University Medical Students Association	(ESUMSA)
	Alex Ekwueme Federal University Medical Students Association	(AE-FUMSA)
	Imo State University Medical Students Association	(IMSUMSA)
	Chukwuemeka Odimegwu Ojukwu University Medical Students Association	(COOUMSA)
South South	Igbinedion University Medical Students Association	(IUMSA)
	Delta State University Medical Students Association	(DUMSA)
	Ambrose Alli University Medical Students Association	(AAUMSA)
	University of Benin Medical Students Association	(UBEMSA)
	Niger Delta University Medical Students Association	(NDUMSA)
	Port Harcourt University Medical Students Association	(PUMSA)
	Rivers State University Medical Students Association	(RSUMSA)
	Calabar University Medical Students Association	(CUMSA)
	University of Uyo Medical Students Association	(UUMSA)

== Presidents ==
Updated from 2019 upward

- 2019 – Josiah Ngibo, ABUMSA (Ahmadu Bello University)
- 2020 – Ogunmefun Michael, OOUMSA (Olabisi Onabanjo University)
- 2021 – Umar Danbuba Muhammad, UMMESA (University of Maiduguri)
- 2022 – Onuorah Webster Jideofor, NAUMSA (Nnamdi Azikiwe University)
- 2023 – Ejim Clement Egba, JUMSA (University of Jos)
- 2024 – Moses Onwubuya, UBEMSA (University of Benin)
- 2025 – Ahmadu Sardauna, ABUMSA (Ahmadu Bello University)
- 2026 – Femi–Adeniyi Oladapo, AMSUL (University of Lagos)

== Activities ==
=== NiMSA Games ===
NiMSA organizes the NiMSA Games biennially and has successfully hosted 19 editions as of 2024. In the most recent edition, which took place in 2024, the Association of Medical Students' University of Lagos (AMSUL) hosted the Games and emerged overall champions, garnering a total of 55 medals, comprising 29 gold, 17 silver, and 9 bronze. The University of Benin Medical Students’ Association (UBEMSA) finished in second place with an impressive haul of 8 gold, 9 silver, and 11 bronze medals, while the Ambrose Alli Medical Students’ Association (AAUMSA) secured third place, earning 8 gold, 5 silver, and 13 bronze medals.

=== "MAK" NiMSA Health Week ===
NiMSA holds an annual national health week which is hosted by a member association. It is tagged the "MAK NiMSA Health week" to honour 3 Medical students (Mustapha, Aisha, Kabiru - MAK ) who unfortunately died at the NiMSA Health Week in 2023 after a boat mishap. The Inaugural "MAK NiMSA Health Week" was held in Abakaliki, Ebonyi State, hosted by the Ebonyi State University Medical Students Association (EBSUMSA).

=== Campaigns and outreach ===
- Preventing Maternal Mortality
- Climate Change: A global menace that can be halted locally
- Medicine And Politics: Mentoring Medical Students For Leadership
- Medical Students For Literary Awards.
- Orangetheworld campaign
- World Oral day
- Starting early: medical students, sexual/reproductive health, and secondary school girls
