= Premier Hotel =

Hotel in Ibadan, Nigeria

Coordinates: 7.4085°N 3.8942°E

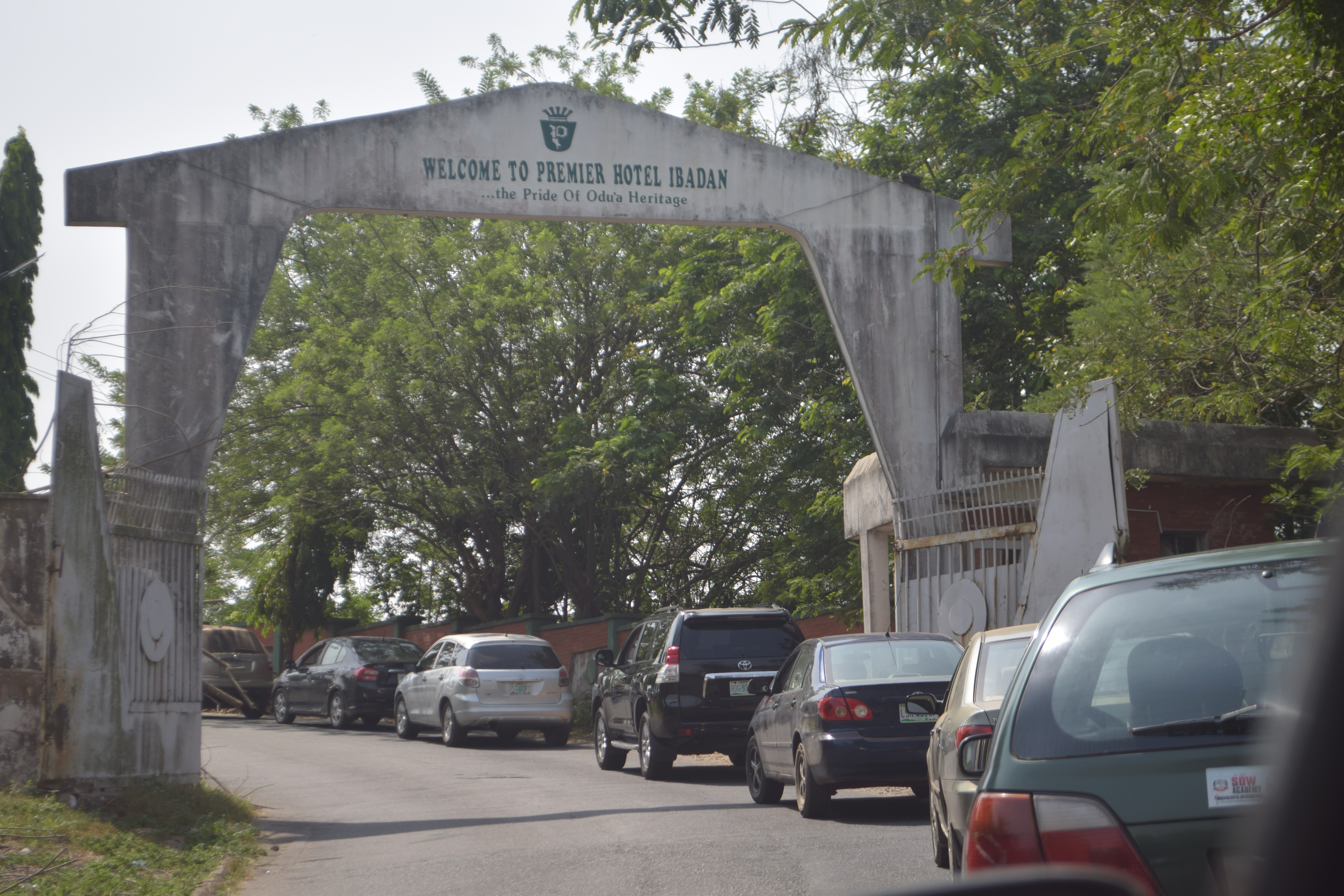
Premier Hotel, Ibadan

The Premier Hotel, Ibadan, a subsidiary of Odu'a Heritage Company, is one of the oldest and most prestigious hotels in Ibadan, Nigeria. Its central location on the peak of Mokola Hill gives it a unique visibility hundreds of miles away, both day and night –due in part to its white cladding and bright lighting. The hotel is the most visited in the city of Ibadan and is known for hosting expatriates, heads of states, and other foreign dignitaries.

== History ==
Premier Hotel is one of the oldest hotels in West Africa. It is situated on the top of Mokola Hills and about 14 km from the Ibadan Airport, Oyo state. The hotel has about 87 bedrooms.
