= Abayomi Arigbabu =

Nigerian mathematician and academic

Abayomi Adelaja Arigbabu

Commissioner for Education, Science, and Technology Ogun State

Personal details
- Born: Abayomi Adelaja Arigbabu; 26 July 1962 (age 64) Ogun State
- Education: University of Lagos; University of South Africa

Abayomi Adelaja Arigbabu (born 26 July 1962) is the commissioner for education, science, and technology of Ogun State, Nigeria. He was the former vice-chancellor of Tai Solarin University of Education

He holds a Bachelor of Science Degree in mathematics from the University of Lagos and Master of Science in mathematics from the same university. He later proceeded to the University of South Africa in Pretoria for his Doctor of Philosophy in mathematics, Science and Technology with specialization in mathematics education.

Professionally, he has been actively involved in strategic pedagogical planning for over three decades. He also has scores of academic and scholarly publications, both nationally and internationally. He is an external examiner and assessor for doctoral thesis and post-graduate programmes in Universities in and outside Nigeria.

== Membership ==
- Fellow, Mathematical Association of Nigeria
- Fellow, Science Teachers Association of Nigeria
- Member, Nigeria Mathematics Society
- Member, Southern Africa Association for Researchers in Mathematics, Science and Technology Education
