= Moshood Abiola Polytechnic =

Tertiary learning institution in Abeokuta, Ogun State, Nigeria

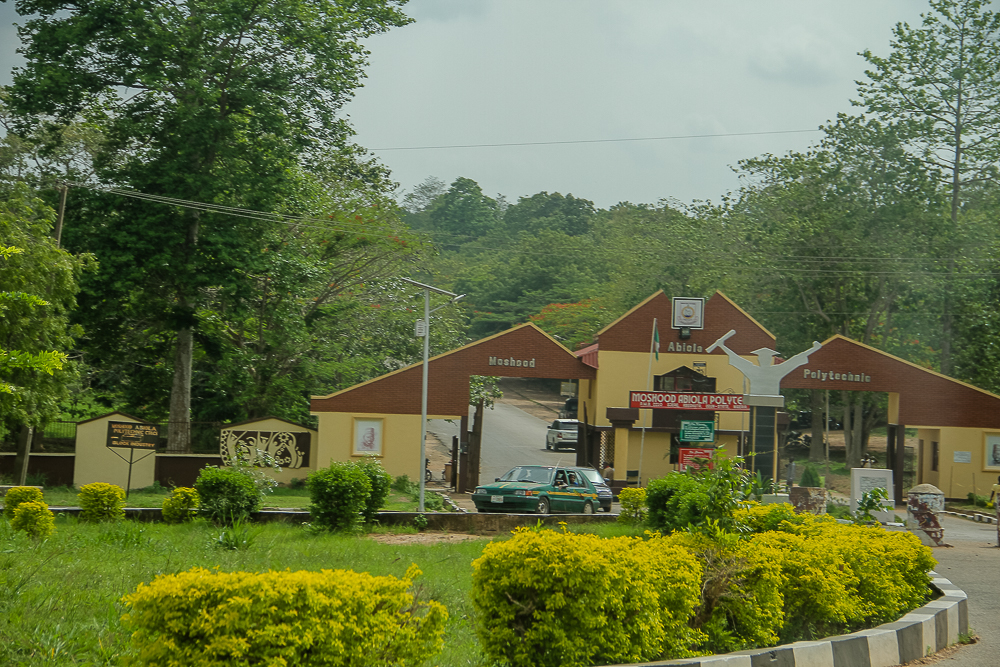
- Moshood Abiola Polytechnic entrance gate in Abeokuta, Ogun State
- Type: Public
- Established: 1978/79 Academic Session
- Rector: Arc. Dr. Babatunde Adekoyejo Jolaoso
- Location: Abeokuta, Ogun State, Nigeria
- Website: www.mapoly.edu.ng

Moshood Abiola Polytechnic also known as MAPOLY is a tertiary learning institution in Abeokuta, Ogun State, Nigeria. The Ojere campus is in the South-Eastern part of Abeokuta, covering about 960 hectares of rolling land bounded by the Ogun River to the south. It is named after Moshood Kashimawo Olawale Abiola, who was elected President of Nigeria in 1993, but prevented from taking office. Following the death of Chief MKO Abiola, the Polytechnic's greatest benefactor in 1998, the Institution was renamed Moshood Abiola Polytechnic, Abeokuta.

The polytechnic was formally established in 1980 as Ogun State Polytechnic during the military administration of Harris Eghagha. Although the idea of the Polytechnic was originally conceived by Brigadier Harris Eghagha, the government of Chief Olabisi Onabanjo saw it through. The Polytechnic started on two temporary campuses, Oke-Egunya and Onikolobo, moving to the Ojere campus between April 1985 and March 1988.

== Department and courses available ==
Presently, the polytechnic has five schools, each headed by a director, and 21 departments, each headed by a Head of Department. The schools, along with their corresponding departments, are:

- Business & Management studies (Accountancy, Business Administration, Business & Finance, Office & Technology Management, Marketing).
- Communication & Information Technology (Mass Communication and General Studies)
- Environmental Studies (Architecture, Urban & Regional Planning, Estate Management, Building Technology, Quantity Surveying, and Surveying & Geo-Informatics).
- Engineering (Civil Engineering, Computer Engineering, Mechanical Engineering, and Electrical/Electronic Engineering).
- Science and technology (Science Laboratory Technology, Food Technology, Pharmaceutical Technology, Leisure and tourism, Mathematics & Statistics, and Computer Science).

== See also ==
- List of polytechnics in Nigeria
