= Saidu Ayodele Balogun =

Nigerian politician

Governor of Ogun State
- In office March 1976 – July 1978
- Preceded by: David Jemibewon (Western State)
- Succeeded by: Harris Eghagha

Personal details
- Born: 20 April 1941 (age 85)

Major General Saidu Ayodele Balogun (born 20 April 1941), is a retired Nigerian general who appointed the first Governor of Ogun State, Nigeria after it was formed from part of the old Western State in March 1976, holding office until July 1978 during the military regime of General Olusegun Obasanjo.

Balogun was an infantry brigade commander at the time of the coup in July 1975 when General Yakubu Gowon was ousted by general Murtala Mohammed. When appointed governor of the newly created Ogun State by Murtala Mohammed's successor, Olusegun Obasanjo, he faced various problems such as finding accommodation for government workers, who at first had to commute from Ibadan in the new Oyo State to Abeokuta, although by the end of his term of office most had found local accommodations. The Government offices were mostly rented at first. He established the Ogun State School of Health Technology of Ilese-Ijebu, at first on a temporary site.
