= Chimaroke Nnamani =

Nigerian politician

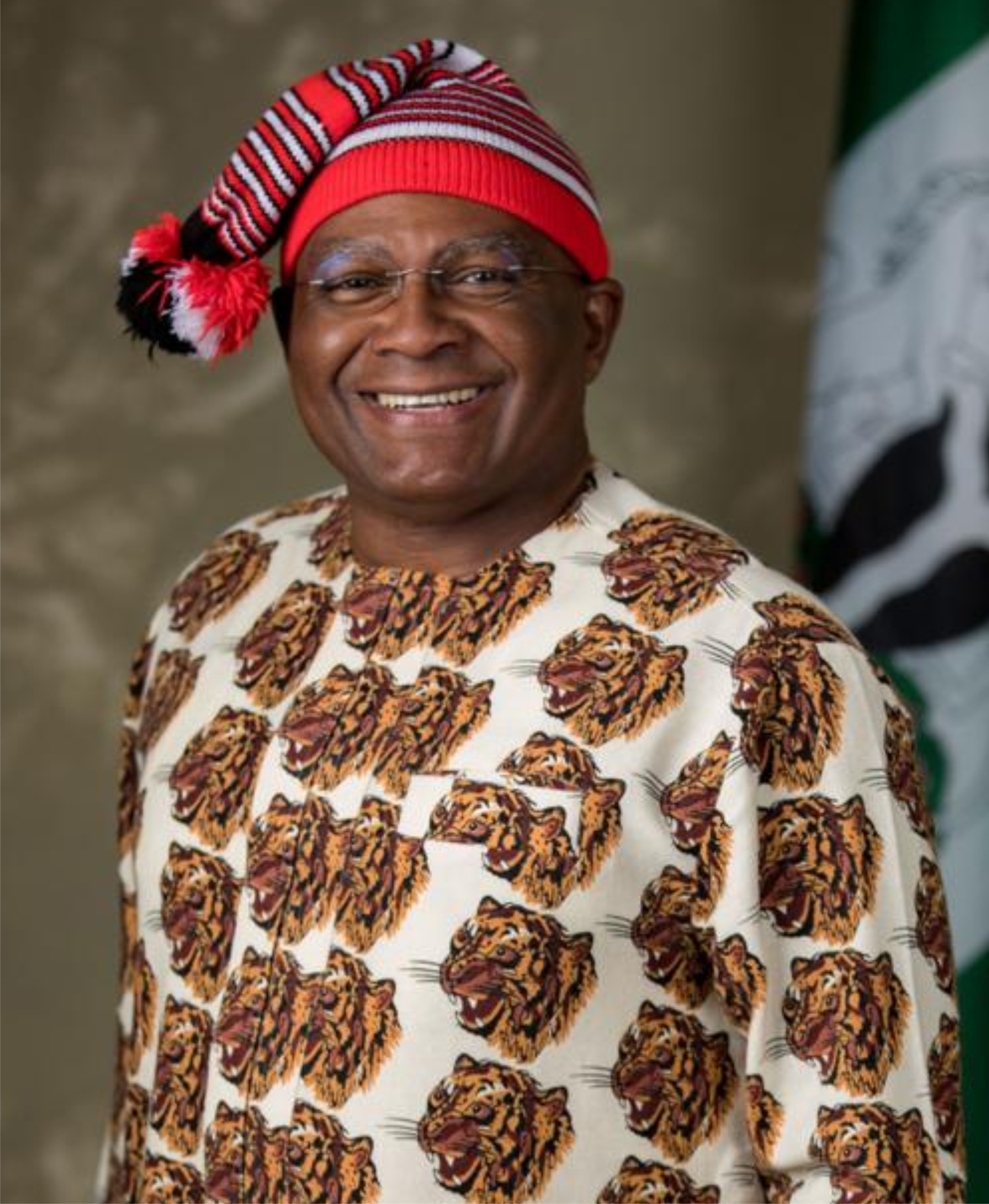

Senator for Enugu East
- In office 11 June 2019 – 11 June 2023
- Preceded by: Gilbert Nnaji
- Succeeded by: Kelvin Chukwu
- In office 5 June 2007 – 6 June 2011
- Preceded by: Ken Nnamani
- Succeeded by: Gilbert Nnaji

3rd Governor of Enugu State
- In office 29 May 1999 – 29 May 2007
- Preceded by: Adewunmi Agbaje
- Succeeded by: Sullivan Chime

Personal details
- Born: 30 May 1960 (age 66) Port Harcourt, Rivers State, Nigeria
- Party: Peoples Democratic Party (PDP)

Chimaroke Nnamani (//; born 30 May 1960) is a Nigerian medical doctor and politician from Enugu State. He was elected Governor of Enugu State in the 1999 Enugu State gubernatorial election from 1999 to 2007. He subsequently served as a Peoples Democratic Party (PDP) Senator for Enugu East Senatorial District from 2007 to 2011 and was re-elected in 2019.

== Education ==
Nnamani, though born in Port Harcourt, hails from Agbani in Nkanu West Local Government Area of Enugu State. He attended the Methodist Primary School, Enugu, and the College of the Immaculate Conception (CIC), also in Enugu. He is a graduate of the College of Medicine, University of Nigeria (Enugu Campus). He had his medical post-graduate training in the State University of New York and the Inter-faith Medical Center/Down State Medical Center, Brooklyn New York (Obstetrics and Gynecology). His medical postgraduate training and research continued at the Perinatal Biology Center, Loma Linda University, Loma Linda, Southern California; Molecular Biology and Tissue Cytology Laboratory, Jerry "L" Pettis Veterans Administration Hospital, Loma Linda, California; Department of Obstetrics and Gynecology and Perinatal Biology, College of Medicine, Loma Linda University (with specialization in maternal fetal medicine); and College of Medicine, University of South Florida.

Research Interest

Basic Medical Science: Gap junction physiology, cell-to-cell communication modulated by connexin protein, tissue cytology, molecular biology and prenatal biology.

Clinical Interest: Premature labour, prematurity and high-risk pregnancy, obstetrics ultrasound, prenatal diagnosis and genetics. He has had research publications and abstract presentations in major scientific journals and meetings (Nnamani et al, 1994, Biology of Reproduction, 50, 377-389).

Division of Perinatal Biology (3), Department of Gynecology/Obstetrics (4), Department of Pediatrics (5), Departments of Anatomy (6), Physiology and Pharmacology (7), Loma Linda University School of Medicine, Loma Linda, California, 92354; Molecular Cytology Laboratory (8), Veterans Administration Medical Center, Loma Linda, California.

Medical Practice/Teaching: Before he veered into politics and public service back home in Nigeria, Dr. Nnamani was an attending physician in the following health facilities in the United States: Loma Linda University Medical Center, California; San Bernardino County Medical Center, California; Riverside General Hospital, California; Florida Hospital, Orlando, Florida; and Arnold Palmer Hospital for Women and Children, Orlando, Florida. He was a maternal and fetal medicine specialist with the Maternal and Fetal Medicine Associates, Principal Practicing Group, Orlando, Florida.

Professional Societies: He belonged to a number of professional societies such as the Society for Perinatal Obstetricians, American Society for Cell Biology, Society for Gynecologic Investigations, American Institute for Ultrasound in Medicine, and Licensure of California, New York, West Virginia, Virginia, Florida and District of Columbia. He was a member of the Board of Trustees (BoT) of the Nigerian Medical Association (NMA), Enugu State.

== Political career ==
Dr. Nnamani's first foray in national politics was his election as the National President of the Nigerian Medical Students' Association (NIMSA). He was elected Governor of Enugu State of Nigeria and re-elected for a second term in the 2003 Enugu State gubernatorial election. His eight years tenure witnessed many groundbreaking projects including the sprawling new permanent campus of the Enugu State University of Science and Technology (ESUT), the Enugu State University Teaching Hospital and College of Medicine at Parklane, Enugu, the Enugu Campus of the Nigerian Law School, the Ebeano Tunnel, dualization of Rangers Avenue and Chime Avenue, opening of a new route linking Nza Street and Chime Avenue in Enugu, the new State Judiciary headquarters, commencement of the construction of International Conference Centre project, the Enugu State Building in Abuja, amongst others.

He was first elected to the Senate of the Federal Republic of Nigeria representing the Enugu East Senatorial District and served from 2007 to 2011. He re-contested for the seat in the April 2011 elections, this time on the platform of the People for Democratic Change (PDC), but lost in controversial circumstances. He vied for the same seat again in the 2015 elections and was widely projected to win when, to the consternation of the populace, his main challenger was surprisingly declared as the winner, this time provoking spontaneous mass protests that rocked the capital city of Enugu for days.

== Return to the Senate ==
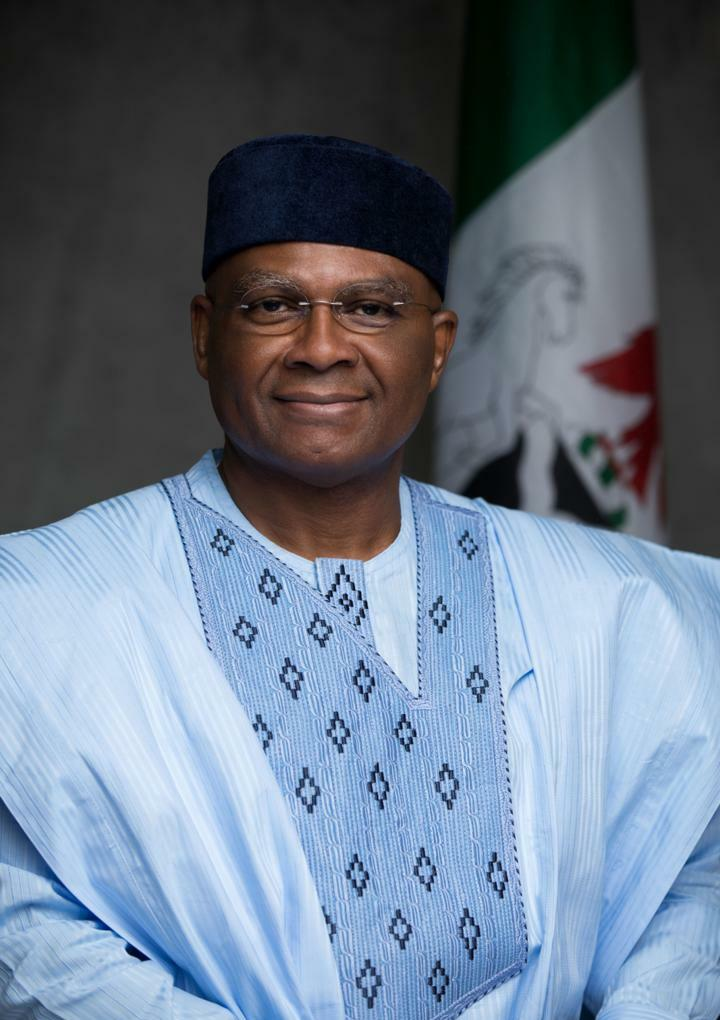
Senator Chimaroke Nnamani Enugu East Senatorial District

Following overtures from the Enugu State chapter of the Peoples Democratic Party (PDP), he returned to the party in 2017. Ahead of the 2019 general elections, he rested mounting speculations over his political future when he picked the senatorial nomination form of the party for Enugu East Senatorial District. At the senatorial primary election held on 2 October 2018 he polled 601 votes to easily beat six other contestants, amongst them the then incumbent Senator Gilbert Nnaji, who polled 69 votes. He soon embarked on a vigorous street-to-street campaign that enlivened Enugu metropolis as the people surged out to cheer him up. He also took his campaign to all the development centers in the 6 local government councils of the senatorial district as well as the major markets, reconfirming his reputation as a crowd puller. In the ensuing National Assembly elections of 23 February 2019, he won with a wide margin. Nnamani scored a total of 128,843 votes to trounce his closest rival, Prince Lawrence Ozoemeka Ezeh, who garnered 14,225 votes while Uchenna Agbo of APGA came third with 1,586 votes. Nnamani has repeatedly credited his smooth return journey to the Senate to the strong backing he received from the Governor of his state, Rt. Hon. Lawrence Ifeanyi Ugwuanyi (aka Gburugburu). He received his certificate of return as a senator-elect from the Independent National Electoral Commission (INEC) on 14 March 2019 and assumed office on 11 June 2019 following the inauguration of the 9th Senate of the Federal Republic of Nigeria. He was subsequently appointed as the Chairman of the Senate Committee on Cooperation and Integration in Africa/NEPAD and Deputy Chairman of the Committee on Drugs and Narcotics, in addition to membership of the following Senate Committees: Health, Foreign Affairs, Federal Roads Maintenance Agency (FERMA), Diaspora and NGOs, Land Transport as well as Women Affairs.

== Highlights of governance ==
Education

As governor, Dr. Nnamani established District Education Centers in the state, conceived and built the permanent campus of the Enugu State University of Science and Technology (ESUT), constructed and handed over to the Federal Government, the Enugu Campus of the Nigerian Law School, and also constructed and handed over to the Nigerian Air Force, the Airforce Comprehensive High School at Agbani. His administration established new special science schools in different parts of the state, carried out the renovation of public primary and secondary schools and provided them with school desks and teachers' tables and chairs.

Health

Being a medical doctor, it was no surprise that health was a top priority to Governor Nnamani. His administration established four district hospitals and 19 cottage hospitals in the state. A partnership with the United Kingdom Department for International Development (DFID) saw to the rehabilitation and upgrade of many healthcare facilities under the Partnership for Transforming Health Systems (PATHS I & II). The flagship project of the administration in the health sector, however, was apparently the transformation of the former General Hospital at Parklane, GRA, Enugu, into the present ESUT Teaching Hospital and ESUT College of Medicine. The massive project involved the construction of new buildings, refurbishing of existing ones and the provision of modern equipment that enabled the facility to pass the accreditation of the relevant authorities in the health cum education sectors.

Infrastructure

Road construction and rehabilitation was one area that won the Nnamani administration early popular acclaim. Among the rural road network undertaken by the administration were the Opi-Nsukka Road, Awgu-Ndeabor Road, Ozalla-Agbani Road, Agbani-Akpugo-Amagunze Road, Amechi-Obeagu-Amodu-Umueze Road, Oghe-Aguobu-Umumba Road, Aguobu-Ugwuoba Road, Oji-Awgu Road, Nsukka urban roads, University of Nigeria roads, Nsukka-Ibagwa Road, Obolo Afor-Ogrute Road, etc. There were also new road infrastructures like the Nyaba Bridge, and the Ebeano bypass linking NBL Ama Brewery at 9th Mile Corner with the Enugu-Onitsha expressway. In the Enugu metropolis, the Nnamani era witnessed the dualization of Chime Avenue as well as Rangers Avenue, Ebeano Tunnel connecting the busy Ogui Road and Garden Avenue, a new route linking Nza Street in Independence Layout with the Upper Chime Avenue in New Haven, amongst the streets rehabilitated in Abakpa Nike, Trans Ekulu, Achara Lawyout I and II, Uwani, Coal Camp and so on.

Electricity

The administration pursued a policy of lighting up the rural communities with the provision of electricity. Over 130 rural communities benefitted from this intervention.

Water Supply

The administration improved public water supply in the state. Some of the interventions in the sector included the Ozalla Ezimo Water Scheme in Udenu LGA, expansion of Enugu Urban water supply, expansion of the Ajali River water works, reactivation of the Ede-Obala booster station for water supply to Nsukka town, Agbani/Amodu water reservoir, revival of Awhum water scheme, and the construction of hundreds of motorized boreholes in the rural communities across the state.

Reforms in locality administration

The administration consciously pursued a policy of enhanced mass participation in the political process and bringing governance closer to the people in the grassroots. Governor Nnamani carried out far-reaching reforms in locality administration which have continued to define the structure of grassroots politics and governance in Enugu State. Following a democratic process, his administration created 56 development centres out of the 17 local government areas of the state, complete with the simultaneous construction of 39 headquarters for the new development centres, while the existing 17 council secretariats served as headquarters for the remaining 17 development centres. Over 200 new autonomous communities were also created (each with its own Town Union and Traditional Ruler), the first time since the creation of Enugu State, thus bringing the total number of autonomous communities in Enugu State to 367 as at May 2007. These reforms went hand in hand with the Community County Council (CCC) initiative, later refocused as the Community Development County Councils (CDCC), a rural development partnership between the rural communities and the State Government. The administration established the Ministry of Poverty Reduction and Human Development which has evolved into a grassroots poverty management scheme in the state. There was also the Local Empowerment and Environmental Management Projects (LEEMP), another bilateral rural development partnership with the World Bank/UK Government that focused on the construction and grading of rural feeder roads and other poverty eradication projects in the rural communities.

== Honours ==
His academic honours include - Fellow of the American College of Obstetricians and Gynecologists, Diplomate of the American Board of Obstetrics and Gynecology, D.Sc. (Honoris Causa), University of Nigeria; Distinguished Fellow of the Nigerian Law School, D.Sc (Honoris Causa), Babcock University, Illisan Remo, Ogun State, Adjunct Professor (Political Science), Babcock University, Illisan Remo, Ogun State, Honorary Fellow of the National Postgraduate Medical College of Nigeria, Ijanikan, Lagos, and Distinguished Fellow of the West African College of Surgeons. He is a Visiting Professor of Physiology, Obstetrics and Gynecology of the Enugu State University of Science and Technology (ESUT).

== Public speaking ==
Governor Nnamani was well known for his intellectual engagements on the travails and prospects of an emerging democracy like Nigeria. His contributions to national discourse took him to the podium in different fora across the country as follows:

Agenda for National Reformation; public lecture at the Forum of Southern Governors' Conference, Conference Hall of the Nike Lake Hotel, Enugu; 10 January 2001.

Ndigbo: Let Us Be Frank with Ourselves; Igbo Summit, at the Federation Hall of Presidential Hotel, Enugu, 19 January 2001.

Ndigbo, Taa Bu Gboo, Echi di lme (Let the Future Begin Now); Odenigbo Forum, Eko L'meridien Hotel, Victoria Island, Lagos, 24 April 2001.

The Press and Our Democracy: The Path Not Trodden; Nigeria Association of Women Journalists (NAWOJ) lecture series, Main Auditorium of the National Universities Commission Headquarters, Abuja; 15 May 2001.

Transition Politics and Nigeria's Search for Sustainable Democracy; First edition of Post Express Anniversary Lecture series, MUSON Center, Onikan Lagos; 2 July 2001.

Ndigbo and the Challenges of Nation Building; Annual Lecture series of the Enugu Sports Club, Main Hall, Sports Club, Enugu, Enugu; 24 September 2001.

Ndigbo, Can Your Generation Sustain Our Igboness?; Annual lecture series of South East Development Initiative (SEDI), at the Sam Mbakwe Hall, Concorde Hotel, Owerri, 14 December 2001.

Democracy 2003: It Must Be the Voters' World; Babcock University, Main Auditorium, Ilisan Remo, 18 March 2002.

Refocusing Igbo Youth Energy; Igbo Students' Renaissance Day lecture series of the Confederation of Igbo Students (CIS), Federation Hall, Hotel Presidential, Enugu, 11 April 2002.

National Question in Nigeria and the Democratic Experience; Annual lecture of Department of Political Science, University of Lagos, at the Main Auditorium, University of Lagos, 23 April 2002.

The Wave of Arbitrary Culture in our Nascent Democracy, Lecture series of the Abuja Council of the Nigeria Union of Journalists (NUJ), International Conference Centre, Abuja, 20 May 2002.

Rediscover Nigeria ... Democracy as a Vehicle for Investment Growth and Development; Rediscover Nigeria Project Initiative, Sheraton Hotels, Abuja, 28 May 2002.

By the Hill and Valleys of Udi and Nsukka: The people, Their Heritage ... Their Future; Wawa Revival Lecture of the Enugu State Development Association (ESDA), Federation Hall, Hotel Presidential, Enugu; 28 November 2002.

Reflections on Architecture as Social Mirror ..the Enugu Perspective; Annual lecture of the Nigeria Institute of Architecture (NIA), Enugu State Chapter, Federation Hall, Hotel Presidential, Enugu; 29 November 2002.

Scare Mongers and the Challenges in a Defective Political Society; Pro-convocation lecture of the Babcock University, New University Guest House, Ilisan Remo, 13 March 2003.

The Godfather Phenomenon in Democratic Nigeria ... Silicon or Real; Lecture series of Udi Hills, Nigeria, held in conjunction with The Source Magazine, Nigerian Institute for International Affairs (NIIA), Lagos, 20 May 2003.

Confronting the Local Government Question, ... Can this Nation be Anchored on Variety?; Lecture series of the Basic Society Initiative (BSI), Nigerian Institute for International Affairs (NIIA), Lagos, 5 August 2003.

Gap Crisis in Transition Democracy and the Challenges of Proper Expectation Framework; Lecture of the Nigeria Union of Journalists (NUJ), Kogi State Council; Glass House, Government House, Lokoja, 2 September 2003.

National Conference in Nigeria: by Who, For Who, . . .Power Oligarchies or Citizens?; Lecture of the Movement for Democracy and Social Justice (MDSJ), Sokoto, Main Auditorium of the Uthman Dan Fodio University, Sokoto, 25 September 2003.

12 June: the North and the rest of us; Second edition of the Bola Ige Memorial Lecture, Main Hall, Premier Hotel, Ibadan, 30 September 2003.

Poverty in Nigeria ...Eroding the dignity of man; Annual Dignity of Man lecture of the University of Nigeria Alumni Association (UNAA), Princess Alexandria Hall, University of Nigeria, Nsukka, 6 October 2003

Chieftaincy and Security: an overview of non-centralized East/West Niger Igbo; Dedicated to the 40th Anniversary of the Coronation of the Emir of Kano, HRM Alhaji (Dr) Ado Bayero, at Murtala Muhammed Library Complex, Ahmadu Bello Way, Kano City, 13 October 2003.

The Press and the Nigerian Project; public lecture of the Newspaper Proprietors' Association of Nigeria (NPAN), Diamond Hall, Golden Gate Restaurant, Ikoyi, Lagos, 23 October 2003.

Poverty and the challenge of New Hope Evangelism; Synod lecture at the Third Synod of the Church of Nigeria, Anglican Communion, Egbu, at St. Peter's Anglican Church, Umuneke, Ngor Okpuala Local Government Area, Imo State, 3 November 2003.

The Press, the faith and the State; Lecture at the annual press week of the Correspondents' Chapel of the Nigeria Union of Journalists (NUJ), Plateau State Council, Main Hall, Hill Station Hotel, Jos, 18 November 2003.

Globalising in Poverty, 2003 lecture series of the Political Science Department, University of Ilorin, at the Main Auditorium, University of Ilorin (mini campus), Ilorin, 19 November 2003 (???)

The foetus as a Patient: the Meeting Point Between the Pediatrician and the Obstetric Surgeon; Guest Lecturer at the 3rd Annual Conference of the Association of Pediatric Surgeons of Nigeria (APSON), at the Conference Hall, Nike Lake Resort, Enugu, 27 November 2003

The Bar and the Bench: Public Expectations in a Nascent Democracy; Annual bar lecture of the Abuja Branch of the Nigerian Bar Association (NBA), at Ogun/Osun Hall of the NICON Hilton Hotel, Abuja, 10 December 2003

Poverty ... the Challenge of Medical Ethics; Annual Guest Lecture of the Institute of Child Health (ICH), University of Nigeria Teaching Hospital (UNTH), Enugu, at the Conference Hall of Nike Lake Resort, Enugu, 17 March 2005.

Artisans as Leaders ... Zoning to Power; Public lecture of the Arewa House, Centre for Historical Research and Documentation, Old Ministers' Quarters, Malali, Kaduna, Nigeria, 20 July 2005.

Poverty in Surplus ... water, water, everywhere; little ever to drink; 2005 Edition of Justice Chike Idigbe Memorial Lecture, Oduduwa Hall, Obafemi Awolowo University Ife, Ile-Ife, Nigeria, 29 July 2005.

Poverty in Nigeria ... we are all in it together; Annual Lecture, Investiture and Dinner of the International Association of Lions Club, District 404 B, Nigeria, Sheraton Hotel and Towers, Ikeja, Nigeria, 30 July 2005.

Nigeria Central: Middle Belt, Glue of the Nation; 2005 public lecture series of the Nigeria Union of Journalists (NUJ), Plateau State Council; Hill Station Hotel, Jos, Nigeria, 16 August 2005.

Agenda for Better and Stronger Nigeria, Welcome Speech at the Conference of Governors, Legislators and Leaders of Thought of Southern States of Nigeria, held at the Eastern Nigeria Parliament Building, Enugu; 19 December 2005.

Regionalism and Challenge of National Integration, First Annual Lecture of The Westerner Newspapers Ltd., Premier Hotel, Ibadan; 31 August 2006.

== See also ==
- List of governors of Enugu State
