= Adebayo Johnson Bankole =

Nigerian politician

Commissioner of Finance, Planning and Budget Oyo State
- In office 2006–2006
- In office 2007–2011

Personal details
- Born: October 29, 1945 (age 80) Ogbomoso, Oyo, Nigeria
- Party: Peoples Democratic Party (PDP)
- Relations: Patent: Jacob Bankole, Abigail Bankole
- Education: Fordham University

Adebayo Johnson Bankole (born 27 October 1945) is a Nigerian politician who was a commissioner in Oyo State, Nigeria. He held the position of commissioner during the administrations of both Governor Alao Akala and Governor Kolapo Ishola’.

== Early years ==
Bankole was born in Ile Bale Ajinapa in Orire Local Government Area of Ogbomoso on October 27, 1945, to Jacob Bankole and Abigail Bankole.

In 1952, Bankole commenced his elementary education at St Stephen Primary School. In 1954, he transferred to St David's Primary School in Ogbomoso. In 1959, Bankole attended the Anglican Secondary Modern School in Ogbomoso. In 1961 he graduates with a Secondary Modern School Certificate.

In 1962, Bankole went to Kaduna to attend Secretarial Studies. After graduation, he got a job as Secretary-typist at Africa Alliance Insurance company. Bankole later became Secretary to the District Manager of Nigeria Airways. He then attended Staff Development Center, where he studied for a General Certificate of Education (GCE). He passed the GCE ordinary level in 1969 and the advanced level in 1970 and 1971.

Bankole went to New York City in September 1971 and enrolled in January 1972 at Fordham University. He graduated in June 1974 with a Bachelor of Science Degree in Accounting. He received his Master of Business Administration (MBA) in Finance and Investment from Baruch College in February 1976.

== Career ==
In September 1976, after finishing his education in the United States, Bankole returned to Nigeria. He assumed a position at the Central Bank of Nigeria as Research Assistant in the Department of Research . He was later transferred to the Capital Issues Commission which later transformed to the Nigerian Securities and Exchange Commission (SEC) as financial analyst.

In January 1978, Bankole took at job at City Securities Limited (stockbrokers), in Lagos. He trained as Dealer on the floor of the Nigeria Stock Exchange. He moved on to M. L. Securities Limited (stockbrokers); dealt on the floor of the Nigerian Stock Exchange.

In 1985, Bankole returned to Ogbomoso to start farming and agro-allied business at Olugbemi village near Ajinapa with factory at Aroje village, Ogbomoso.

== Political life ==
In 1987, Bankole was elected to the councillorship of the Oyo Local Government representing Ikoyi constituency. This ended in 1989 when the Orire Local Government was created on the disputed land between Ogbomoso and Oyo.

Bankole served as Oyo state Commissioner for Health and Social Welfare from 1992 to 1993. He was elected a member of National Constitutional Conference in Abuja in 1994–1995. He was appointed Chairman Governing Board of Federal Institute of Industrial Research, Oshodi from 2001 – 2004. He was appointed Oyo state Commissioner for Finance, Budget and Planning in February 2006 and reappointed to the same office in May 2007 and served till May 2011.

Bankole was awarded Fellow of the Chartered Institute of stockbrokers in 2009.
