= Tai Solarin University of Education =

Public university in Ijebu-Ode, Nigeria

Coordinates: 6.79281°N 3.93049°E

Tai Solarin Federal University of Education
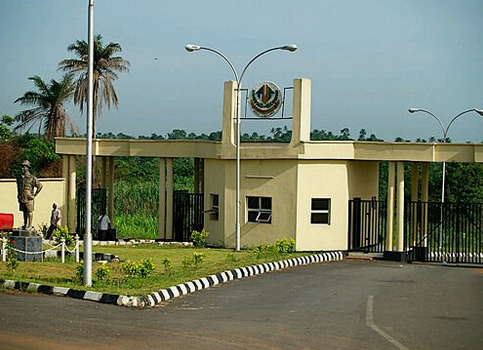
- Type: Public
- Established: 2005
- Vice-Chancellor: Samuel Ekundayo Oladipo (6th Substantive VC)
- Location: Ijebu-Ode, Ogun State, Nigeria
- Website: https://tasued.edu.ng/

Tai Solarin Federal University of Education (TASFUED) is a federal university of education in Nigeria. It was established in 2005 as a state university in Ogun State. The Federal Government on Friday, March 7, 2025 adopted the institution as a federal university. This decision was approved by President Bola Ahmed Tinubu, and marked the transition of TASUED from a state-owned institution to a nation government-university. It is located in Ijagun, Ijebu-Ode, Ogun State.

== History ==
The university was named after the Nigerian educational administrator and human rights activist Tai Solarin (1922–1994). It is the 76th approved university in Nigeria by the National Universities Commission The Tai Solarin University of Education (TASUED, pronounced TA-SOOD), was proclaimed a full-fledged university (and a transformation of the erstwhile Tai Solarin College of Education, established January 1978, on 29 January 2005 by the administration of Otunba Gbenga Daniel. The Nation’s Premier University of Education.

TASFUED was officially approved as a university by the National Universities Commission (NUC) on Tuesday, 28 November, 2005. The university has, from inception, incorporated a four-year mandatory vocational and entrepreneurial study into the curriculum of its B.Ed., B.Sc. (Ed.), B.Sc., and B.A. (Ed.) programs such that students are awarded two certificates at graduation, one in their chosen course of study and the other a proficiency certificate in the vocational and entrepreneurial study. Furthermore, in a sequel to the NUC Resource Assessment exercise in April 2019, the Commission, in addition to the existing programs (undergraduate and postgraduate), granted the university the approval to establish some postgraduate programs and the full-time mode of some undergraduate programs. In all, 59 programs were newly approved: 33 PhD programs, 13 M.A., M.Sc., M.A.(Ed.), and M.Sc.(Ed.) programs, and 13 B.A. and B.Sc. programs.

== Vice Chancellors ==
The Vice Chancellors of the University since its founding are as follows:

- Olukayode Oyesiku
- Segun Awonusi
- Oluyemisi Obilade
- Abayomi Arigbabu
- Adekunle Adeogun (3 November 2025 – May 5, 2026)
- Samuel Ekundayo Oladipo (May 5, 2026 – till date)

== Colleges ==
The university has six colleges and The Postgraduate College:

- College of Specialised and Professional Education (COSPED)
- College of Science and Information Technology (COSIT)
- College of Humanities (COHUM)
- College of Social and Management Sciences (COSMAS)
- College of Vocational and Technology Education (COVTED)
- College of Agriculture and Hospitality Management (COAHM)
- The Postgraduate College (TPC)

== Campus and hostels ==
The university has halls and auditoriums such as the Otunba Gbenga Daniel Auditorium, University (e-learning) Block, Alex O. Onabanjo Complex, CEPEP building, the Science Complex, and the Lecture Theatre. It also has halls of residence (hostels) for students. Students also reside in hostels built by the residents of the local communities.

== Occupy TASUED ==
A new government came to power in Ogun State in 2011 led by Senator Ibikunle Amosun and attempted to scrap TASUED. Students of the institution rose against the decision and formed the #OccupyTASUED campaign.

On February 14, 2012, on one of their trips to the state house in Oke-Mosan, Abeokuta, the bus conveying TASUED supporters got its tyre punctured and rolled over twice. The accident inflicted injuries on many and eventually caused the death of Olatunji Fashina aka Humble TeeJay. Layemi, Azeez Agboola (Olofin), Ishola Adebayo Crown, Owoblow, Tola Ben, and a few others were also on the bus that was involved in the accident.

Today, Tunji Fashina is being honoured as a hero of the successful struggle because he paid a huge price with his life. The Students Union Government (SUG) building was named after him.

== Notable alumni ==
- Mosun Filani, Nollywood actress
- Glory Onome Nathaniel, Nigerian hurdler, silver medalist at the 2017 Islamic Solidarity Games
- Olamide, Nigerian rapper, singer, songwriter, and record executive
