= Olusegun Osoba =

Nigerian politician and journalist (born 1939)

Aremo Olusegun Osoba
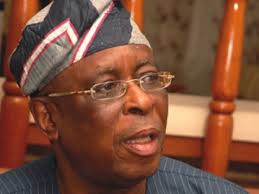

Governor of Ogun State
- In office 29 May 1999 – 29 May 2003
- Deputy: Sefiu Adegbenga Kaka
- Preceded by: Kayode Olofin-Moyin
- Succeeded by: Otunba Gbenga Daniel
- In office 2 January 1992 – 17 November 1993
- Deputy: Abdul Rafiu Ogunleye
- Preceded by: Oladeinde Joseph
- Succeeded by: Daniel Akintonde

Personal details
- Born: 15 July 1939 (age 87) Osogbo, Southern Region, British Nigeria (now in Osun State, Nigeria)
- Party: Social Democratic Party (1991–1993); Alliance for Democracy (1998–2006); Action Congress of Nigeria (2006–2013)
- Education: Methodist Boys' High School, Lagos; University of Lagos; Indiana University
- Occupation: Politician; journalist

Chief Olusegun Osoba (born 15 July 1939) is a Nigerian journalist and politician who served twice as governor of Ogun State first from 1992 to 1993 during the Nigerian Third Republic and then from 1999 to 2003.

== Early life and education ==
Olusegun Osoba was born to Mr. and Mrs. Jonathan Babatunde Osoba. Osoba attended a series of professional courses after high school graduation from Methodist Boys' High School, Lagos. He obtained a diploma in journalism at the University of Lagos and went for one-year course in the United Kingdom on the scholarship of the Commonwealth Press Union in 1967. In 1969, he was studying in Bloomington, USA at Indiana University's department of journalism. In 1974 he won the Nieman Fellowship award for journalism for years of postgraduate study at Harvard University, Cambridge, Massachusetts, USA. He is the first Nigerian to have won this prestigious Nieman Fellowship for Journalism.

== Journalism ==
Osoba started his career in journalism in 1964 working with the Daily Times of Nigeria as a trainee reporter covering crime stories and by 1966, he was the diplomatic correspondent of the Times. He became news editor in 1968, deputy editor of the Sunday Times in 1971 and deputy editor of the Times in 1972. In August 1975, he became the editor of the Daily Times of Nigeria, then left the firm in November 1975 to take up the task of General Manager of the Ilorin based Nigerian Herald. He returned to the Times in 1984 as the managing director. Internationally, he worked as a stringer or local correspondent for the British Broadcasting Corporation, The Times of London, Newsweek Magazine, and United Press International News Agency. He is the chairman of the Governing Board of the Nigerian Institute of Journalism and a member of the executive board of the International Press Institute representing Black-Africa from 1984 to 1992.

He was a member of the Nigerian Constituent Assembly in 1988. He is also a member of the Commonwealth Press Union, London and the Nigerian Union of Journalist.

== Political career ==
Osoba was elected on two occasions as Governor of Ogun State first from January 1992 until November 1993 with the Social Democratic Party (SDP). He was removed from office by Sani Abacha's administration on 17 November 1993. In the 1999 Ogun State gubernatorial election, he was elected again as governor with the Alliance for Democracy party (AD), holding office between May 1999 and May 2003. He was a member of the 2014 National Conference.

== Awards ==
Osoba holds the National Honours of the Commander of the Order of the Federal Republic (CFR) and the Commander of the Order of the Niger (CON).

== Personal life ==
Osoba is married to Chief Aderinsola Osoba, the Beere Awujale of Ijebu. They are the parents of four children, two boys and two girls: Kemi, Olumide, Oluyinka and Tobi. Osoba holds the chieftaincy titles of the Akinrogun of Egbaland and the Aremo Awujale of Ijebu.
