= Mohammed Uwais =

Nigerian jurist (1936–2025)

Mohammed Lawal Uwais GCON CON

Chief Justice of Nigeria
- In office 1995 – 12 June 2006
- Preceded by: Mohammed Bello
- Succeeded by: Salihu Moddibo Alfa Belgore

Personal details
- Born: 12 June 1936 Zaria, Northern Region, Colony and Protectorate of Nigeria (now Zaria, Kaduna State, Nigeria)
- Died: 6 June 2025 (aged 88)

Mohammed Lawal Uwais GCON (12 June 1936 – 6 June 2025) was a Nigerian jurist who served as the chief justice of the Supreme Court of Nigeria from 1995 to 2006. He chaired a commission that published a much-publicized report on electoral reform.

Uwais was the son of the Chief Alkali, and later Waziri of Zaria emirate.

== Electoral reform report ==
After retiring from the Supreme Court, Uwais chaired a panel on electoral reform that submitted a report on 11 December 2008 with recommendations that included establishing commissions to deal with Electoral Offences, Constituency Delimitation and Political Parties Registration and Regulation. Some of the power vested in the Independent National Electoral Commission (INEC) and the State Independent Electoral Commissions would be transferred to the new commissions. The committee recommended proportional representation in elections to the Federal and State legislatures and to the local government councils. The report also recommended that the head of the Independent National Electoral Commission should be appointed by the judiciary rather than the President. This recommendation was rejected by President Umaru Yar'Adua.

Yar'Adua forwarded a modified version of the Uwais report to the legislature in 2009, drawing considerable criticism since many felt that recent elections had been deeply flawed and that basic reforms were required. In March 2010, Acting President Goodluck Jonathan forwarded an unedited version of the report to the National Assembly for approval, by implication, saying that the recommendations should be implemented in their entirety before the 2011 national elections. The issue of power to appoint the INEC head remained controversial. Before Jonathan had resubmitted the report, the Senate Committee on the Review of the Constitution had rejected the recommendation to transfer this power to the judiciary. After the resubmission, deputy chief whip of the Senate, Mohammed Mana, argued that letting judiciary appoint the INEC chairman violated the principle of separation of powers, since the judiciary was responsible for hearing the cases arising from elections.

== Personal life and death ==
Uwais was born in Zaria, Kaduna State on 12 June 1936. He died on 6 June 2025, at the age of 88.
