= Mohammed Lawal =

Nigerian naval officer (1946-2006)

Rear Admiral Mohammed Alabi Lawal

Governor of Kwara State
- In office 29 May 1999 – 29 May 2003
- Preceded by: Rasheed Shekoni
- Succeeded by: Bukola Saraki

Military Governor of Ogun State
- In office December 1987 – August 1990
- Preceded by: Raji Alagbe Rasaki
- Succeeded by: Oladeinde Joseph

Personal details
- Born: 24 January 1946 Ilorin
- Died: 15 November 2006 (aged 60)

Military service
- Allegiance: Nigeria
- Branch/service: Nigerian Navy
- Rank: Rear Admiral

Mohammed Alabi Lawal; January 24, 1946 – November 15, 2006) was a Nigerian naval officer who was military governor of Ogun State between December 1987 and August 1990 during the military administration of General Ibrahim Babangida. He was one of the pioneers of the Nigeria Navy Secondary School Abeokuta.The then Navy Captain Mohammed Lawal, invited the Nigerian Navy to consider a location of the defunct St Leo's Teachers' Training College at Ibara Abeokuta (www.nnssab.net)on a hilly Onikolobo site. This premises had been abandoned and merely served as a route to the Catholic Compound and was also used for administering a newly conceived secondary school in that name. The Nigerian Navy considered the site and found it suitable. After the return to democracy in 1999 he was elected governor of Kwara State, holding office from 29 May 1999 to 29 May 2003.

During the 1999 Kwara State gubernatorial election, Lawal was elected governor under the umbrella of the All Peoples Party (APP). He was said to be a protégé of Senator Dr. Abubakar Olusola Saraki. Saraki later moved to the People's Democratic Party (PDP).

Lawal initiated a N250 million libel action against a paper The People's Advocate based in Ilorin, published by Abdulkareem Adisa but later withdrew the suit after the two men reconciled.

In the 2003 Kwara State gubernatorial election, he ran for re-election but lost as his previous supporter Abubakar Saraki backed his son Bukola Saraki as candidate for governor of Kwara state and his daughter Gbemisola R. Saraki as senator for Kwara State Central; both his children were elected.

In October 2006, it was reported that Nuhu Ribadu, chairman of the Economic and Financial Crimes Commission was investigating Lawal for alleged diversion of funds.

Lawal died in London after a brief illness on November 15, 2006.

== Administration ==
Alhaji Mohammed A. Lawal, was a democratically elected politician and a former military officer. He served as the seventeenth Chief Executive of Kwara State from 29 May 1999 to 29 May 2003, representing the All Nigeria People's Party (ANP). Lawal's administration was marked by his swift and precise approach, reminiscent of his military background, in tackling various socio-economic challenges. One of Lawal's notable achievements was the implementation of a comprehensive road development and rehabilitation program. Numerous roads in Ilorin, as well as other major towns and villages across the state, were resurfaced under this initiative. Recognizing the significance of mass transit for economic growth, Lawal granted autonomy and self-accounting status to the Kwara State Transport Corporation (Kwara Express). To bolster the corporation's fleet, his administration purchased 15 new air-conditioned buses.

Healthcare Sector, Lawal's government procured and distributed medical and non-medical equipment worth N500 million to healthcare institutions. This investment aimed to ensure effective and efficient healthcare delivery throughout the state. The improvement of the Water Supply Scheme and water installations that serviced approximately 180 communities also received substantial resources. To alleviate the acute shortage of residential accommodation in Ilorin, Lawal's administration initiated the construction of 150 two-bedroom houses in Irewole Ilorin at a cost of N180 million. Additionally, they reconstructed and completed the previously abandoned Woman's Development Centre along Ajase-Ipo Road, amounting to a cost of N36 million. Recognizing the importance of communication with the population, Lawal prioritized enhancing logistical support for the Herald newspaper. This effort led to an increased production frequency, from twice to three times a week. Furthermore, his administration completed the FM stereo station in the Apata Yakuba area of Ilorin.

Lawal's administration introduced several other improvements during his tenure. These included the distribution of tractors to all 16 Local Government Areas (LGAs) at a 40% subsidy, the construction of 193 prototype clinics, and the launch of the state's Poverty Alleviation Programme. Additionally, all dilapidated structures in the state's health institute were rebuilt.
