= List of governors of Ogun State =

This is a list of administrators and governors of Ogun State, Nigeria. Ogun State was formed on 3 February 1976 when Western State divided into Ogun, Ondo, and Oyo states.

Name	Title	Took office	Left office	Party	Notes
Saidu Ayodele Balogun	Governor	Mar 1976	Jul 1978	Military	
Harris Eghagha	Governor	Jul 1978	Oct 1979	Military	
Olabisi Onabanjo	Governor	Oct 1979	Dec 1983	UPN	
Oladipo Diya	Governor	Jan 1984	Aug 1985	Military	
Oladayo Popoola	Governor	Aug 1985	1986	Military	
Raji Alagbe Rasaki	Governor	1986	Dec 1987	Military	
Mohammed Lawal	Governor	Dec 1987	Aug 1990	Military	
Oladeinde Joseph	Governor	Aug 1990	Jan 1992	Military	
Olusegun Osoba	Governor	January 1992	November 1993	SDP	
Daniel Akintonde	Administrator	9 Dec 1993	22 Aug 1996	Military	
Sam Ewang	Administrator	22 August 1996	August 1998	Military	
Kayode Olofin-Moyin	Administrator	August 1998	29 May 1999	Military	
Olusegun Osoba	Governor	29 May 1999	29 May 2003	AD; AC	
Gbenga Daniel	Governor	29 May 2003	May 2011	PDP	
Ibikunle Amosun	Governor	29 May 2011	29 May 2019	ACN/APC	
Dapo Abiodun	Governor	29 May 2019	Incumbent	APC	

== See also ==
- Nigeria
- States of Nigeria
- List of state governors of Nigeria
