= List of villages in Abia State =

This is a list of villages in Abia State, Nigeria organised by local government area (LGA), district/area (with postal codes also given) and polling units.

== By postal code ==
Below is a list of districts and areas, which includes villages, farm settlements and schools, organised by postal code:

LGA	District / Area	Postal code	Villages
Aba North	Eziama	450102	Eziama; Osusu, Uratta, Ariria
Aba North	Ogbor hill	450101	Ogbo; Umuola-Egbelu; Umuola-Okpulor
Aba South	Aba Ukwu	450104	Umuokpoji, Abaukwu, Asaokpuaja; Eziukwu; Obuda
Aba South	Ohazu	450103	Akoli; Amanfuru; Asaeme; Ihieorji; Ndiegoro; Nnetu; Ohabiam; Umuagbai; Umumba; Umunisi; Umuogele; Umuosi
Arochukwu	Abam	442106	Ahuma; Amaeke Abam; Amaelu; Amaogbu; Amuru; Atan; Eziafor; Idima; Itum; Ndi Agwu; Ndiebe; Ndi Ebelagu; Ndi Ememe; Ndi Ibom; Ndi Ite; Ndi Nsi; Ndi Oji Abam; Ndi Oji Ugwo; Ndi Okereke; Ndi Okorie; Ndi Okwara; Ndiya; Oduenyi; Ohafor; Ovukwu Abam; Ozu Abam; Ugwu Aduenyi
Arochukwu	Arochukwu	442101	Agbagwu; Amangwu; Amannagwu; Amasa; Amoba; Amukwa; Amuvi; Asaga; Atani; Ibom; Isinkpu; Obinkita; Oror; Ugbo; Ugwu Avor; Ugwuakuma; Ujari; Ulughangwu
Arochukwu	Ihechiowa	442104	Aboru; Achara; Agbor; Amaetiti; Amafia; Amamiri; Amiyi; Atan; Ebemofia; Ndiokpo; Nkporo; Obicihie; Obinto; Okpo; Umuchiakuma; Umuye; Umuzomgbo
Arochukwu	Isu	442103	Aba Isu; Amachi; Amakarama; Amukabi; Iheosu; Obieze; Obomime
Arochukwu	Ututu	442102	Abuma; Amaebem; Amaeke; Amakpofia; Amankwu; Amasa; Amatiti; Amodu; Eziama; Nkpakpi; Obiagwulu; Obiakana; Obiene; Obijoma; Obiluoko; Ohomja; Ubila; Ugwo-Ogo; Ukwuakwu
Bende	Alayi	441121	Amaeke; Agboakoli; Amakwu; Amaukwu; Umuenyere; Etiti; Isiaku; Isiama; Umunkalu; Amankalu; Amaigwu
Bende	Bende	441113	Agbamuzu; Agbomiri; Amaoba; Amaogwu; Etiti; Ishimigu; Isiegbu; Ndi-Torty; Ndiekeugo; Ndiokorukwu; Nditoli; Obuohia; Ogo Ubi Bende; Okporoenyi; Okputong; Onuinyana; Ukpom; Umuokoro
Bende	Ezeukwu	441122	Amaelu; Amabanta; Amuta; Ebguegbubu
Bende	Igbere	441120	Agbo; Amaiyi; Amakpo; Amaukwu; Amankalu; Amaofufe; Amoji; Eziama; Ibinanta; Ibinaukwu; Ohumola; Okafia; Umuisi
Bende	Item	441123	Amaeke; Akanu; Akwanu; Amaekpu; Amaokwe; Amaokwo; Apanu; Okagwe; Okayi; Okoko; Umuakpa; Umunnato; Umuokpo
Bende	Itumbauzo	441114	Ibom; Mbukwa; Ndi-Iwo; Ntalakwu; Okpoedi; Umuokpe
Bende	Nkpa	441117	Amadiaba; Amaedukwo; Amaohoro; Amaokpu; Eluama; Muegwu; Nkporo; Odua; Okpobia; Ugwu; Umuede
Bende	Ozui-Tem	441118	Amaeke; Amagbo; Amaukwu; Ebem; Elugwumba; Idiagbo; Ihie Mba; Mgbele; Ndiaikpakpim; Ndiobu; Ndiokoroguodu; Ndiombe; Obuofia; Ofiavu; Ogboko; Umukpti; Umuobia; Umuokoroali; Umuolazi
Bende	Ugwueke	441122	Amaba; Amabanta; Amaeze; Amagu/Amaba; Amakwu; Amangwu; Amaokayi; Amauta; Amiyi; Ezenta; Ezeukwu; Ndielu; Umungwere
Bende	Umuhu-Ezechi	441116	Achi; Amabo; Amaugwu; Amabia, Amazu; Umuokwu
Bende	Umu-Menyi	441119	Akoli Imenyi; Amaoji; Amaukwu; Elu-Lodu; Lodu; Lohum
Bende	Uzuakoli	441115	Agbozu; Amamba; Amankwo; Eluama; Ngwu
Ikwuano	Ariam Usaka	440110	Amaegbu; Ariam Eku-Elu; Ariam-Alala; Azunchai; Ekpiri-Eludu; Ekpiri-Alala; Ekwelu; Ndieke; Ndiokoro; Ndiorie; Obeagwu; Obeama; Oboni I; Oboni II; Upa; Usaka Ukwu
Ikwuano	Ibere	440108	Amaru; Elemaga; Iberenta; Ihim; Inyila; Isiala; Itunta; Iyalu; Nkalunta; Nowugwo; Obuohia; Obuoro; Umuemenike; Umulu; Umuokwe
Ikwuano	Oboro	440109	Ahuwa; Amaoba-Ikputu; Amaoba-Ime; Amawom; Aro-Ajatakiri; Aro-Anyama; Ekebedi; Isiala Oboro; Ndoro; Nnono; Ntalakwu; Obunta; Okwe; Ugbegbule; Umuariaga; Umudike; Umugbalu; Umuigu; Umuokwo
Ikwuano	Oloko	440111	Amizi; Awomukwu I; Azuiyi; Iziugwu-Arizi; Akanu Nchara; Obohia-Okike; Oloko; Umugo; Usaka-Eleogu; Otoro Nchara; Ahaba Ukwu; Isiala Ahaba; Awomukwu II
Ikwuano	Omuegwu	440113	Orori; Umuagum; Umuegwu-Okpala; Umulemeze; Umuosu
Isiala Ngwa North	Ama-Asa	451102	Amachi; Aro-Achara; Eziam; Ohuhu; Umuakwu; Umuosonyeike; Usaka-Umuofo
Isiala Ngwa North	Amapu-Ntigha	451106	Imerem I; Imerem II; Umokuza; Umualata; Umuebeyi; Umunka; Umuobia; Umuodoala; Umuokatu; Umuokwa
Isiala Ngwa North	Amasa-Ntigha	451105	Avoh; Egbelu; Okpuala; Oriala-Ugaa; Umuekpe; Umunkalu; Umuogele Ntigha
Isiala Ngwa North	Ihie	451104	Amaogwugwu; Egbelu-Ihie; Umunachi; Umuode
Isiala Ngwa North	Ngwa Ukwu	451101	Abayi; Ahiaba Okpuala; Ahiaba Ubi; Amaorji; Amapu-Ngwa; Amuzu; Iheoji; Ihie; Obikabia; Okpuala Ngwa; Osusu; Umuchima: Umuapiti
Isiala Ngwa North	Nsulu	451107	Agburuike; Ezial - Nsulu; Ikputu; Mbubo; Nbawsi; Umuosu
Isiala Ngwa North	Umuoha	451103	Amaekpu; Amapu; Amaputa; Eziama-Uratta; Ichi; Umarandu-Uratta
Isiala Ngwa South	Amaise	451117	Aga; Amaokpu; Nnoyi; Umuekene; Umunwarida
Isiala Ngwa South	Amaise-Ahaba	451115	Mabedeala; Nkpuka; Umuacha; Umuikaa; Umuvo
Isiala Ngwa South	Isiala Nvosi	451110	Amaiyi; Amaku; Ebeyi; Eputuke; Eziama; Mgbokonta; Obuba; Ohuhu Ekwuru; Umuawuru; Umuehim; Umuejea; Umuguru; Umunevo; Umunko; Umunkpeyi; Umuofa; Umuogele; Umuokiri; Umuokpogho
Isiala Ngwa South	Mbutu	451114	Amankwo; Egbelu-Mnbutu/Umuokere; Obekwesu; Okungwu; Owerrinta; Uhum; Umogwu; Umuduru; Umuekwe; Umueleke; Umuezeocha; Umuichi; Umuocheala-Umuokorie; Umuojima Efene; Umuojima-Ukwu; Umuokwu Umuagu; Umuosisi; Umuosoala; Waterside
Isiala Ngwa South	Ngwa	451116	Amaudara; Umuala; Umuebi; Umuezeoji; Umundogu; Umunta
Isiala Ngwa South	Okporo Ahaba	451113	Amuke; Mba; Mbutu Umuoke; Okpuhie; Umuajuju; Umuakuma; Umuenere; Umuhie; Umuoko
Isiala Ngwa South	Omoba	451112	Umu Ugba; Umuagu; Umuamosi; Umuezechi; Umuikea; Umuire; Umuokoroukwu; Umuoleihe
Isiala Ngwa South	Osokwa - Nvosi	451109	Iheoji; Ikem; Mgbogbo-Ndiolumbe; Nkpuruta-Ndiolumbe; Ntigha; Ogele-Ukwu; Umuabali; Umuada
Isiala Ngwa South	Ovu-Ngwa	451108	Agbaragwu; Amaede; Ele-na-Ekpu; Iheneriala; Ngwama; Okpungwu; Umuaja; Umuakpor; Umuapu I; Umuapu II; Umuejije; Umuihi; Umuotiri; umuukuru
Isiala Ngwa South	Ovu-Okwu	451111	Amauha; Obiekwensu; Okpuala; Ovorji; Umiri; Umuakwa; Umuegoro; Umueleghele; Umuene; Umuowa; Umurasi
Isuikwuato	Achara-Uturu	441107	Amanyanwu; Amidi; Amokwe; Eziama; Ogwahia; Onuzu
Isuikwuato	Ezere	441104	Amaelen; Amaja; Amaohuru; Umuagu; Umuakwua
Isuikwuato	Imenyi	441101	Agbonelu; Ahaba-Ehuma; Amaeke; Amahia/Amaogudu; Amiyi Ahaba; Anume; Eluama; Ihenzu; Ihiokwe; Mbalano; Obayi; Ohonja; Ohoroho
Isuikwuato	Isu Amaku	441106	Amaise; Amaobu-Nkuma; Amaobuaja; Ekebe; Obinohia; Obodo; Uloma; Umuama; Umuebere Aja; Umuebere Nkuma; Umuemoko; Umuokogbuo
Isuikwuato	Mbaugwu	441108	Akpukpa; Isunabo; Ndundu; Ngodo-Ugwu; Nvururu; Ugiri; Umuamara
Isuikwuato	Ogudo-Asa	441103	Acha; Amaibo; Amaiyi-obinohia; Amaiyi-Uhu; Nunya
Isuikwuato	Ohaise	441102	Acha; Amaba-Oboro; Amaogodu; Amokwe; Amuta; Echiele; Ikpa; Ndiagidi; Ndiohia; Otampa; Umuakpumsi; Umuansuo; Umuohoroko
Isuikwuato	Umun-Nekwu	441105	Amawo; Eziama; Ohaukali; Ugwuntu; Umuezebele; Umuihu; Umura
Obi Ngwa	Abayi	453109	Alaoji; Amorji; Ehere; Ukpakiri; Ntigha; Obeala; Ohanze; Osusu Amaukwa; Owohia; Umuafor; Umuguru; Umuochoi; Umuokahia; Umuokoroato; Umuola Egbelu; Umuorukwu
Obi Ngwa	Ahiaba	453102	Abala-Nkwonwelechi; Ayaba-Ubi; Iheorji; Obikabia; Ohuru-Amaige; Ohuru-Amangwo; Ohuru-Umuekwesu; Osaokea; Osusu-Umukpegh; Umuagu; Umuariama; Umuelendu; Umueme; Umuibe; Umukalika; Umunwankwo; Umuohia; Umuojima; Umuokea; Umuonyengwa
Obi Ngwa	Akuma-Imo	453108	Akpa-Mbator; Amairinabuo-Ovom I; Amasa-Ovom
Obi Ngwa	Ala-Ukwu	453106	Agburuke; Amapu; Amuzu; Aziama; Isiahia; Owo-Ahiafor; Umuaforkwu; Umuagada/umueijioke; Umuagwa; Umuagwula; Umuakoma; Umudim; Umuechi; Umueke; Umuezigbe; Umugwuma; Umuibe; Umujaghari; Umumagberugo; Umuobasi; Umuobiakwa; Umuoji; Umuokatawom; Umuomegbi; Umuoru
Obi Ngwa	Ibeme	453110	Abala-Ibeme; Abala-Nkomiri; Ahiaka; Oberete; Obete-Uku; Obete-Umodu; Obete-Umuoha; Ohanze-Agwo
Obi Ngwa	Mgboko	453103	Azuogwugwu; Ekwereazu-Ngwa; Isiko; Mgboko-Anya; Nenu; Ntigha-Umuaro; Umoma; Umuanunu; Umuaro; Umubi; Umuhu-Aba; Umukiri; Umuokahia; Umuomegh; Umuopara-Amuzu; Umuopara-Egbelu
Obi Ngwa	Mgboko-Amiri	453101	Azaima; Mgboko-Amaku; Mgboko-Okpulo; Mgboko-Umuezi; Mgboko-Umuoba; Obete; Ofokobe; Umuikeaba; Umukpi; Umuobasi; Umuocha; Umuomaghi; Umuotu; Umuwezi
Obi Ngwa	Mgboko Ngwa	453106	Agbaragwu; Agburuke-Isiugwu; Akanu-Afagha; Akanu-Okpulo; Akpuga; Avor; Ichi; Ikala-Umudagwu; Itu-Ikila; Itu-Ngwa I; Itu-Ngwa II; Itukpa; Mbutu; Mgboko-Osa; Mgboko-Umu-Ora; Osa I; Umulelu; Umusoiku-Ete-na-Onuma
Obi Ngwa	Ndiaka	453105	Ndiakata; Onicha; Umuirora-Amano; Umuokereke Ngwa
Obi Ngwa	Ntigha Uzor	453109	Abam-Nsulu; Amapu; Amauvuru; Eziama; Iferefe; Obete-Nchima; Okpuama-Uku; Okuenyi; Umuaguma; Umuali; Umuogele
Ohafia	Abiriba	442110	Ameke; Amogudu; Agboji
Ohafia	Ameke Abiriba	442111	Ameke Echichi; Amanta; Amebelu; Amuba elu; Amuba Agbor; Binyom; Agboha; Ndi Okoronta; Amaja; Nderim; Umueso; Ukpoh
Ohafia	Amogudu Abiriba	442112	Umuechuku; Udanta; Amamba; Amangwu; Ogbur
Ohafia	Agboji Abiriba	44112	Agboji Elu; Agboji Agbor
Ohafia	Ama-Asato	453117	Abayi-Amaugwu; Ayaba-Umueze; Umubgasi; Umuchchi; Umuchlegbu; Umule; Umuocham; Umuode; Umuodu-Isiyi; Umuoru
Ohafia	Amangwu Ohafia	442113	Amangu; Amuma; Amungu; Ofiele
Ohafia	Amasa	453115	Amaogwuawu; Amapu; Amuzu; Ibeku; Mbutunta; Umuagwu; Umuihima; Umuihioma; Umuiimo-Osisiasa; Umuimo-; Umuimo-Egbelu; Umuobasi
Ohafia	Amavo	453118	Osiloji; Umudaba; Umuekpe; Umunankwoala; Umuokoroche; Umuoriaku; Umuorika; Umuoyonta
Ohafia	Aro Ngwa	453114	Obiekwesu; Okpuala-Aro; Umuarakpa; Umuejie; Umugwua; Umukaa; Umukai; Umuohia; Umuonyenkwu; Umuotuo
Ohafia	Ebem Ohafia	442109	Ebem; Ihenta; Ndi-Amogu; Ndi-Anyaori; Ndi-Okala
Ohafia	Isiama Ohafia	442108	Amaekpu; Elu; Ndi-Uduma-Ukwu; Ndi-Uku; Nkwebe; Oboro; Okagwe; Okoro
Ohafia	Nbem-Ohafia	442109	Ebem; Ihenta; Ndi-Amogu; Ndi-Anyaori; Ndi-Okala
Ohafia	Nkporo	442111	Agbaja-Nkporo; Amurie-Nkporo; Elughu-Nkporo; Etitiana-Nkporo; Ndi-Nko-Nkporo; Obofia-Nkporo; Okwoko-Nkporo; Ukwa-Nkporo
Ohafia	Ohafor Ohafia	442114	Amuke; Asaga; Eziafor; Ndi-Ibe; Ndi-Orieke
Ohafia	Oko-Aku	442112	Okon-Aku
Ohafia	Ona-Ohafia	442115	Abia; Akanu; Isiugwu; Ndi-Uduma-Awoke
Osisioma	Amaitoli	453113	Ariaria; Asamoka; Mbutu-Isiahia; Mbutu-Umuga; Oberete; Ogbu; Umudi; Umuejijie; Umuidigha; Umungbede; Umuocheala; Umuojima-Ogbu; Umuojima-Okereke; Umuozo
Osisioma	Amasa	453115	Amapu; Amuzu; Ibeku; Mbutunta; Umuagwu; Umuihima; Umuihioma; Umuiimo-Osisiasa; Umuimo-Amaogwuawu; Umuimo-Egbelu; Umuobasi
Osisioma	Aro-Ngwa	453114	Obiekwesu; Okpuala-Aro; Umuarakpa; Umuejie; Umugwua; Umukaa; Umukai; Umuohia; Umuonyenkwu; Umuotuo
Osisioma	Okpu-Umuobo	453112	Amauzu; Mgboko-Umuete; Umuaba; Umuaga; Umuara; Umuobo; Uratta/Amaekpu
Osisioma	Okupu-Umuobo	453112	Amauzu; Mgboko-Umuete; Umuaba; Umuara; Umuga; Umuobo; Uratta / Amaekpu
Osisioma	Oso-Okwa	453116	Akpa I; Akpa II; Akpa III; Akpa iv; Amaiyi; Amankwu I; Amankwu II; Amaugha; Okpalukwu; Umuaja; Umuenyikwu; Umugala; Umuncheagu; Umunpata; Umuobilaha II; Umuobiloha I; Umuohia; Umuokerete
Osisioma	Umunneise	453119	Amapu; Amauzu; Okpuala; Umumba;
Osisioma	Uratta	453111	Amapu-Igbengwo; Amapu-Ighengwo; Egbede; Egbede-Owo; Egbelu-Owo; Ibibi; Obuzor; Okpokoroala; Okpokotoala; Umu-Ocho; Umuaduru; Umuagbara; Umueji; Umueke; Umueze 11; Umueze II; Umuigwe; Umuikea; Umuodu-Ehichie; Umuokoroegbu
Ugwunagbo	Ugwu-Nagbo	453120	Abayi; Akanu; Alaoji; Amaokpu-Umuitiri; Amaorji; Amapu-Ukebe; Amapu-Umodo; Amavo; Amuzu-Amaikoro; Asa-Amuhi; Asa-Nnentu; Asa-Oberie; Asa-Umunka; Asaumuakwa; Ngwaiyiekwe; Nngwa; Obegu; Obuzor; Osusu - Aku; Ozaa-Umuebukwu; Ukebe; Umuaja; Umuama-Oke; Umuchekwu; Umugo; Umule-Osoamadi; Umunkama; Umuodo
Ukwa East	Abayi	453109	Alaoji; Amorji; Ehere; Ikpakiri; Ntigha; Obeala; Ohanze; Osusu Amaukwa; Owohia; Umuafor; Umuguru; Umuochoi; Umuokahia; Umuokoroata; Umuola Egbelu; Umuoruwu
Ukwa East	Akuma-Imo	453108	Akpa-Mbator; Amairingbua-Ovom 1; Amasa-Ovom
Ukwa East	Ala-Ukwu	453106	Agburuke; Amapu; Amuzu; Eziama; Isiahia; Owo-Ahiafor; Umuaforkwu; Umuagada/; Umuagwa; Umuagwula; Umuakoma; Umudim; Umuechi; Umueijioke; Umueke; Umuezigbe; Umugwuma; Umujaghari; Umumagberugo; Umuobasi; Umuobiakwa; Umuoji; Umuokatawom; Umuomegbi; Umuoru
Ukwa East	Azumini	452107	Asumini-Stranger; Azumini; Ohukwu; Okoloma Quarters; Umunta
Ukwa East	Ikwueke	452108	Eti; Mkpujakere; Mkpuohia-Oba; Obeaku; Obunku; Ohambele; Ohanso
Ukwa East	Ikwu-Orie	452104	Amakam; Amaobu; Amorji; Mkpukpator; Mlpukpuokwo; Ogbunga 1; Ogbunga 11; Ohaogwe; Okotoko
Ukwa East	Ikwuo-Rieator	452105	Abaki; Akanu; Mkpukpuaja; Mkpukpuoha; Obuozu; Ogbuagu; Ohaobu; Umuogor; Mkpukpule
Ukwa East	Obohia	452102	Obohia
Ukwa East	Ohuru	452103	Ikiruamike; Obegu; Obija; Oboau; Obosau; Obozu; Osuogwo; Ukebe; Umise; Umuaelaki; Umumbukwa; Umuodo; Umuogazi; Umuokara; Umuopara
Ukwa East	Umuigbube-Achara North	452106	Umuihute-Akirika-Obu; Umunkaru-Akirika-Obu;Umuadienweh-Akirika-Obu; Umuokafor-Akirika-Obu; Akirika-Nta;
Ukwa East	Umuigbube-Achara	452106	Akanu; Akirika - Uku
Ukwa East	Umuihueze	452101	Akwete; Ohandu; Umuibe
Ukwa West	Asa-North	452116	Obingwu; Omuma-Uzor; Umuekechi; Umuezeke; Umuikukor
Ukwa West	Asa South	452114	Aparazu; Obiahia; Obiawom; Ogwe; Okpokoro-Ala; Ozanta; Ozatta; Ugwati; Umuabali; Umuachakwu; Umuachoke; Umuada; Umuadata; Umuaebo; Umuakirika; Umuanyika; Umuazuta; Umuechke; Umukwuru; Umunkpulocha-; Umuodeke; Umuogwu; Umuololo; Umura
Ukwa West	Ipu-East	452112	Ezebudele; Obehie; Obiakpu; Obibor; Obuzor; Umuahala; Umuajoha; Umuelechi
Ukwa West	Ipu-South	452111	Imo River; Okorhia; Uzuaku
Ukwa West	Ipu-West	452113	Etitiuzo-Owaza; Eze Ugwu-Owaza; Owaza; Umoekekewekwe-; Umu-Acharaba; Umuagala-Owaza; Umuakata-Owaza; Umudobia; Umuegwusi-Owaza; Umueme-Owaza; Umungbeje-Owaza; Umungede-Owaza; Umunkpulu-; Umuohiata-Umudobia; Umuokerete-; Umuokwolu-Owaza; Umuololo-Owaza; Umuosakara-; Umuoyeke-Owaza
Ukwa West	Obokwe	452115	Amaukwu; Ikenyi; Ogwati; Umuakwa; Umuguru 1; Umuika; Umuinwere; Umunduru; Umuoka; Umuopere; Umuopere-Kamanu
Ukwa West	Ozar Ukwu	452109	Oborhia; Oke-Ikpe; Owo-Ala; Owo-Asa; Umuadienwe; Umuebulugwu; Umuiku; Umunteke
Ukwa West	Ozar West	452110	Obalu; Obiga; Umuituru; Umukalu; Umuokwo; Umuorie
Umuahia North	Ibeku	440101	Afara-Ukwu; Afaranta; Ajate; Ameke; Amuzukwu; Apuagwu; Avonkwu; Emede; Ihie; Isieke; Iyienyi; Lodu; Ndume; Nkata; Ofeke; Ohokobe; Okwoi; Okwuta; Ossah; Ubani; Ugba; Umohu; Umuafia; Umuana; Umuezeala; Umuhute
Umuahia North	Isingwu	440106	Amafor; Amafor-Ikungwu; Nkwoachara; Umoka; Umuaganga; Umuda; Umuokoro; Umuokwelenta; Umuoriehi
Umuahia North	Nkwoachara	440107	Okwarakaru; Umuawa-Alaocha; Umuezerela; Umuire; Umuyota
Umuahia North	Nkwoegwu	440112	Afugiri; Akpahia-Obiohuru; Akpahia-Okpula; Egwunaeleke; Ngboko; Nkata-Okpula; Nkatalike; Obiohuru; Okaiuga; Umuagbom; Umuagungoliri; Umuakam; Umuegwu-Obiohuru; Umuegwu-Okpuala; Umuekwule I; Umuekwule II; Umukabia; Umule; Umumiri-Umukabia; Umuochu; Umuofiaka; Umuohuru; Umuokehi-Okpuara; Umuokoro-Ala; Umuokwhi-Obiohuru; Umuosu
Umuahia North	Umuhu	440114	Amaogwugwu; Ihige Ude; Isingwu-Ofeme; Mbata-Ofeme; Okwu; Ubaum; Udealamaocha; Uhuala-Ofeiyi; Umuagu; Umuda; Umudiawa; Umueze; Umuezeama; Umuezeaoma; Umuezikwe-Ofeme; Umuhu; Umuogba
Umuahia South	Ohiya	440101	Amaudara; Egbeada 1; Egbeada 2; Elugwu Umuoram; Umueze; Umuimeka; Umuokwom; Umuoram; Umuoyia
Umuahia South	Old Umuahia	440103	Amuzuta; Okwu; Umecheokwu; Umuecheokwu; Umueledi; Umuezeala; Umuobutu; Umuovo
Umuahia South	Olokoro	440102	Abgama; Ahiaukwu; Amakama; Amangwu Elu-Elu; Amankwuo Alala; Amizi; Amuzu; Avonkwu; Itaja; Itaja Obuohia; Itu; Okwu; Umuajata; Umudere; Umuntu; Umuobia; Umuoparaozara
Umuahia South	Ubakala	440104	Abam; Akmibo; Amuzu; Avodim; Eziama; Ipupe; Laguru; Mgbarakuma; Nsirimo; Nsukwe; Umosu; Umuako; Umuogu
Umuahia South	Umuopara	440105	Amachara; Amankwo; Ehume; Ekenobizi; Exeleke; Ogbodimbe; Ogbodiukwu; Ohiaocha; Omaegwu; Umuabli; Umuihe; Umunwanwa; Umuoba
Umunneochi	Alokp-Anta	441112	Amaekwuru; Amaelu; Amaogidi; Ihita; Lokpanta; Obilagu; Umudi; Uru
Umunneochi	Isuochi	441111	Achra; Amuda; Ihie; Lomara; Mbala; Ndiawa; Ngodo; Umuaku; Umuelem; Umuogele
Umunneochi	Nneato	441110	Akawa; Eziama; Ubahu
Umunneochi	Umuch-Ileze	441109	Amaubiri; Eluama Amairoka; Eluama Orota; Eziama; Ihite-Lekwesi; Ihite-Leru; Ikenga-Lekwesi; Ikenga-Leru; Uru

== By electoral ward ==
Below is a list of polling units, including villages and schools, organised by electoral ward.

LGA	Ward	Polling Unit Name
Aba North	Eziama	Railway Quarters I; Railway Quarters II; Railway Quarters III; Railway Quarters IV; Abia Poly I; Abia Poly II; Abia Poly III; Abia Poly IV; Abia Poly V; Abia Poly VI; Eziama High School I; Eziama High School II; Eziama High School III; Eziama High School IV; Eziama High School V; Eziama Central School I; Eziama Central School II; Eziama Central School III; Eziama Central School IV; Eziama Central School V; Eziama Central School VI; Eziama Central School VII; Eziama Central School VIII
Aba North	Industrial Area	Ngwa Cultural Hall - Ngwa Cultural Hall I; Ngwa Cultural Hall - Ngwa Cultural Hall II; Ngwa Cultural Hall- Ngwa Cultural Hall III; Ngwa Cultural Hall- Ngwa Cultural Hall IV; Bata Premises - Bata Premises I; Bata Premises - Bata Premises II; Bata Premises - Bata Premises III; Bata Premises - Bata Premises IV; Lever Brothers Gate - Lever Brothers Gate I; Lever Brothers Gate- Lever Brothers Gate II; Lever Brothers Gate- Lever Brothers Gate III; Lever Brothers Gate- Lever Brothers Gate IV; Independence Road-I. D. H I; Independence Road-I. D. H II; Independence Road-I. D. H III; Independence Road-I. D. H IV; G. B. O. Car Park - Car Park I; G. B. O. Car Park - Car Park II; G. B. O. Car Park - Car Park III; G. B. O. Car Park - Car Park IV; G. B. O. Car Park - Car Park V; Old Post Office - Old Post Office Premises I; Old Post Office - Old Post Office Premises II; Old Post Office - Old Post Office Premises III; Old Post Office - Old Post Office Premises IV; Old Post Office - Old Post Office Premises V; Old Post Office - Old Post Office Premises VI; Old Post Office - Old Post Office Premises VII; Immaculate Conception Primary School Premises - School Premises
Aba North	Osusu I	Osusu Rd. Pri. School-School Premises I; Osusu Rd. Pri. School-School Premises II; Osusu Rd. Pri. School-School Premises III; Osusu Rd. Pri. School-School Premises IV; Osusu Rd. Pri. Schl-School Premises V; Osusu Rd. Pri. Schl-School Premises VI; B. T. C. School Premises I; B. T. C. School Premises II; B. T. C. School Premises III; B. T. C. School Premises IV; B. T. C. School Premises V; B. T. C. School Premises VI; B. T. C. School Premises VII; Okigwe Road. Primary School- School Premises I; Okigwe Road. Primary School Premises - School Premises II; Okigwe Road. Primary School - School Premises III; Okigwe Road. Primary School - School Premises IV; Okigwe Road. Primary School - School Premises V; Okigwe Road. Primary School - School Premises VI; Okigwe Road. Primary School - School Premises VII; Okigwe Road. Primary School - School Premises VIII
Aba North	Osusu II	Osusu Secondary School - School Premises I; Osusu Secondary School - School Premises II; Osusu Secondary School - School Premises III; Osusu Secondary School - School Premises IV; Osusu Secondary School - School Premises V; Osusu Secondary School - School Premises VI; Osusu Secondary School - School Premises VII; Bright Way Nurs. School - School Premises I; Bright Way Nurs. School - School Premises II; Bright Way Nurs. School - School Premises III; Bright Way Nurs. School - School Premises IV; Bright Way Nurs. School - School Premises V; Bright Way Nurs. School - School Premises VI; Bright Way Nurs. School - School Premises VII; Osusu Secondary School - (Bright Way Nurs. School) - School Premises VIII; Pope John Paul College-School Premises I; Pope John Paul College-School Premises II; Pope John Paul College-School Premises III
Aba North	St. Eugenes By Okigwe Rd.	Holy Ghost Comm. School - School Premises I; Holy Ghost Comm. School - School Premises II; Holy Ghost Comm. School - School Premises III; Holy Ghost Comm. School - School Premises IV; Holy Ghost Comm. School - School Premises V; Holy Ghost Comm. School - School Premises VI; Sacred Heart College-School Premises I; Sacred Heart College-School Premises II; Sacred Heart College-School Premises III; Sacred Heart College-School Premises IV; Sacred Heart College-School Premises V; Asa Okpuaja Prim. School Premises; St. Eugene's Prim. Sch. - School Premises I; St. Eugene's Prim. Sch. - School Premises II; St. Eugene's Prim. Sch. - School Premises III; St. Eugene's Prim. Sch. - School Premises IV; St. Eugene's Prim. Sch. - School Premises V; St. Eugene's Prim. Sch. - School Premises VI; Ekwereazu Town Hall - Town Hall
Aba North	Uratta	Uratta Council Hall - Hall Premises I; Uratta Council Hall - Hall Premises II; Uratta Council Hall - Hall Premises III; Uratta Council Hall - Hall Premises IV; Uratta Council Hall - Hall Premises V; Uratta Council Hall - Hall Premises VI; Uratta Council Hall - Hall Premises VII; Uratta Council Hall - Hall Premises VIII; Uratta Council Hall - Hall Premises IX; Uratta Council Hall - Hall Premises X; Uratta Council Hall - Hall Premises XI; Uratta Council Hall - Hall Premises XII; Uratta Council Hall - Hall Premises XIII; Uratta Council Hall - Hall Premises XIV; Uratta Council Hall - Hall Premises XV; Uratta Council Hall - Hall Premises XVI; Uratta Council Hall - Hall Premises XVII; Stella Maris Sec. School - School Premises I; Stella Maris Sec. School - School Premises II; Stella Maris Sec. School - School Premises III; Stella Maris Sec. School - School Premises IV; Stella Maris Sec. School - School Premises V; Stella Maris Sec. School - School Premises VI; Stella Maris Sec. School - School Premises VII; Stella Maris Sec. School - School Premises VIII; Stella Maris Sec. School - School Premises IX
Aba North	Old Aba Gra	Gulf Course Primary School - School Premises I; Gulf Course Primary School - School Premises II; Gulf Course Primary School - School Premises III; Gulf Course Primary School - School Premises IV; Gulf Course Primary School - School Premises V; Gulf Course Primary School - School Premises VI; Gulf Course Primary School - School Premises VII; Gulf Course Primary School - School Premises VIII; Gulf Course Primary School - School Premises IX; Gulf Course Primary School - School Premises X; Gulf Course Primary School - School Premises XI; Sports Club-Governor's Lodge I; Sports Club-Governor's Lodge II; Sports Club-Governor's Lodge III; Sports Club-Governor's Lodge IV; Sports Club-Governor's Lodge V; Water Tank Water Tank Premises I; Water Tank Water Tank Premises II; Water Tank Water Tank Premises III; Water Tank Water Tank Premises IV; Water Tank Water Tank Premises V; Water Tank Water Tank Premises VI; Water Tank Water Tank Premises VII; Water Tank Water Tank Premises VIII
Aba North	Umuola	Umuola Prim. School-School Premises I; Umuola Prim. School-School Premises II; Umuola Prim. School-School Premises III; Umuola Prim. School-School Premises IV; Umuola Prim. School-School Premises V; Umuola Prim. School-School Premises VI; Umuola Prim. School-School Premises VII; Umuola Okpulor Hall - Council Hall I; Umuola Okpulor Hall - Council Hall II; Umuola Okpulor Hall - Council Hall III; Umuola Okpulor Hall - Council Hall IV; Umuola Okpulor Hall - Council Hall V; Umuola Okpulor Hall - Council Hall VI; Umuola Okpulor Hall - Council Hall VII; Umuola Okpulor Hall - Council Hall VIII; Umuola Okpulor Hall - Council Hall IX; Umuola Okpulor Hall - Council Hall X; Umuola Okpulor Hall - Council Hall XI; Umuola Okpulor Hall - Council Hall XII; Umuola Okpulor Hall - Council Hall XIII; Umuola Egbelu Hall - Council Hall I; Umuola Egbelu Hall - Council Hall II; Umuola Egbelu Hall - Council Hall III; Umuola Egbelu Hall - Council Hall IV; Egbelu Village Square - Village Square
Aba North	Ariaria Market	Osusu Rd. Prim. School-Premises I; Osusu Rd. Prim. School-Premises II; Osusu Rd. Prim. School-Premises III; Osusu Rd. Prim. School-Premises IV; Osusu Rd. Prim. School-Premises V; Osusu Rd. Prim. School-Premises VI; B. T. C-School Premises I; B. T. C-School Premises II; B. T. C-School Premises III; B. T. C-School Premises IV; B. T. C-School Premises V; B. T. C-School Premises VI; B. T. C-School Premises VII; Old Internal Revenue-Premises I; Old Internal Revenue-Premises II; Old Internal Revenue-Premises III; Old Internal Revenue-Premises IV; Old Internal Revenue-Premises V; Old Internal Revenue-Premises VI; Old Internal Revenue-Premises VII; Rock House Prim./Nurs. School Aba I; Rock House Prim./Nurs. School Aba II; Rock House Prim./Nurs. School Aba III; Fire Service Station Premises I; Fire Service Station Premises II; Eziobu Prim School Premises I; Eziobu Prim School - School Premises II; Eziobu Prim School - School Premises III; Eziobu Prim School - School Premises IV; Eziobu Prim School - School Premises V; Eziobu Prim School - School Premises VI; Eziobu Prim School - School Premises VII; Osusu Village Hall - Council Hall I; Osusu Village Hall - Council Hall II; Osusu Village Hall - Council Hall III; Osusu Village Hall - Council Hall IV; Osusu Village Hall - Council V; Osusu Village Hall - Council Hall VI; Holy Ghost Comm. School - School Premises I; Holy Ghost Comm. School - School Premises II; Holy Ghost Comm. School - School Premises III; Holy Ghost Comm. School - School Premises IV; Holy Ghost Comm. School - School Premises V; Sacred Heart College-School Premises I; Sacred Heart College-School Premises II; Sacred Heart College-School Premises III; Sacred Heart College-School Premises IV; Sacred Heart College-School Premises V
Aba North	Ogbor I	Wilcox Mem. Sec. Sch. - School Premises I; Wilcox Mem. Sec. Sch. - School Premises II; Wilcox Mem. Sec. Sch. - School Premises III; Wilcox Mem. Sec. Sch. - School Premises IV; Wilcox Mem. Sec. Sch. - School Premises V; Ogbor Hill Hall - Council Hall I; Ogbor Hill Hall - Council Hall II; Ogbor Hill Hall - Council Hall III; Ogbor Hill Hall - Council Hall IV; Ogbor Hill Hall - Council Hall V; His Steps Prim. School - School Premises I; His Steps Prim. School - School Premises II; His Steps Prim. School - School Premises III; His Steps Prim. School - School Premises IV; New Umuahia Rd. Prim. School - School Premises I; New Umuahia Rd. Prim. School - School Premises II; New Umuahia Rd. Prim. School - School Premises III; New Umuahia Rd. Prim. School - School Premises IV; New Umuahia Rd. Prim. School - School Premises V; Mercy Girls Sec. School - School Premises I; Mercy Girls Sec. School - School Premises II; Mercy Girls Sec. School - School Premises III; Mercy Girls Sec. School - School Premises IV; Mercy Girls Sec. School - School Premises V; Mercy Girls Sec. School - School Premises VI; Mercy Girls Sec. School - School Premises VII; Mercy Girls Sec. School - School Premises VIII
Aba North	Ogbor II	Ogbor Hill Prim. School - School Premises I; Ogbor Hill Prim. School - School Premises II; Ogbor Hill Prim. School - School Premises III; Ogbor Hill Prim. School - School Premises IV; Ogbor Hill Prim. School - School Premises V; Ogbor Hill Prim. School - School Premises VI; Girls High School - School Premises I; Girls High School - School Premises II; Girls High School - School Premises III; Girls High School - School Premises IV; Girls High School - School Premises V; Girls High School - School Premises VI; Royal Comm. School - School Premises I; Royal Comm. School - School Premises II; Royal Comm. School - School Premises III; Royal Comm. School - School Premises IV; Royal Comm. School - School Premises V; Royal Comm. School - School Premises VI; Royal Comm. School - School Premises VII; Royal Comm. School - School Premises VIII; Royal Comm. School - School Premises IX; Federal Housing Estate-Sec. Premises I; Federal Housing Estate-Sec. Premises II; Federal Housing Estate-Sec. Premises III; Federal Housing Estate-Sec. Premises IV
Aba North	Umuogor	Umuogor/Umuasoke Hall-Council Hall I; Umuogor/Umuasoke Hall-Council Hall II; Umuogor/Umuasoke Hall-Council Hall III; Umuogor/Umuasoke Hall-Council Hall IV; Umuogor/Umuasoke Hall-Council Hall V; Umuogor/Umuasoke Hall-Council Hall VI; Umuogor/Umuasoke Hall-Council Hall VII; Umuogor/Umuasoke Hall-Council Hall VIII; Umuogor Health Centre-Health Centre I; Umuogor Health Centre-Health Centre II; Umuogor Health Centre-Health Centre III; Umuogor Health Centre-Health Centre IV; Umuogor Health Centre-Health Centre V; Umuogor Health Centre-Health Centre VI; Umuogor Health Centre-Health Centre VII; Umuogor Health Centre-Health Centre VIII; Umuogor Health Centre-Health Centre IX; Umuogor Health Centre-Health Centre X; Umuogor Health Centre-Health Centre XI; Asa Okpulor - Council Hall
Aba South	Eziukwu	Eziukwu Okigwe Road Primary School I; Eziukwu Okigwe Road Primary School II; Eziukwu Okigwe Road Primary School III; Eziukwu Okigwe Road Primary School IV; Eziukwu Okigwe Road Primary School V; Eziukwu Local Govt. Pound Office I; Eziukwu Local Govt. Pound Office II; Eziukwu Local Govt. Pound Office III; Eziukwu Village Hall I; Eziukwu Village Hall II; Eziukwu Village Hall III; Eziukwu Primary School I; Eziukwu Primary School II; Eziukwu Primary School III; Eziukwu Primary School IV; Eziukwu Primary School V; Eziukwu Primary School VI; Eziukwu Primary School VII; Eziukwu Primary School VIII; Eziukwu Ebenator Hall I (57 Omuma Road); Eziukwu Ebenator Hall II; Eziukwu -Eziukwu Egbelu Village Hall I; Eziukwu -Eziukwu Egbelu Village Hall II; Eziukwu -Eziukwu Egbelu Village Hall III; Eziukwu -Eziukwu Egbelu Village Hall IV; Eziukwu Golden Nursery School (Omuma Road) I; Eziukwu Golden Nursery School (Omuma Road) II; Eziukwu Golden Nursery School (Omuma Road) III; Eziukwu-Mainland College I; Eziukwu-Mainland College II; Eziukwu-Mainland College III; Eziukwu-Asa Okpuaja Hall I; Eziukwu-Asa Okpuaja Hall II; Eziukwu-Asa Okpuaja Hall III
Aba South	Asa	Asa Railway Halt Primary School I; Asa Railway Halt Primary School II; Asa Railway Halt Primary School III; Asa Railway Halt Primary School IV; Asa-Osumenyi Hall I; Asa-Osumenyi Hall II; Asa-Osumenyi Hall III; Asa-School Road Prim. Sch I; Asa-School Road Prim. Sch II; Asa-School Road Prim. Sch III; Asa-School Road Prim. Sch IV; Asa Awka Etiti Hall I; Asa Awka Etiti Hall II; Asa Awka Etiti Hall III; Asa-Township Prim. Sch. I; Asa-Township Prim. Sch. II; Asa-Township Prim. Sch. III; Asa-Township Prim. Sch. IV; Asa Ukpor Hall I; Asa Ukpor Hall II
Aba South	Enyimba	Enyimba-Obuda Village Hall I; Enyimba-Obuda Village Hall II; Enyimba-Obuda Village Hall III; Enyimba- Isiekenesi Hall I; Enyimba- Isiekenesi Hall II; Enyimba- Isiekenesi Hall III; Enyimba- Isiekenesi Hall IV; Enyimba- Isiekenesi Hall V; Enyimba- Isiekenesi Hall VI; Enyimba-National High School I; Enyimba-National High School II; Enyimba-National High School III; Enyimba-Ekwulumili Hall I; Enyimba-Ekwulumili Hall II; Enyimba-Ekwulumili Hall III; Enyimba-Ekwulumili Hall IV; Enyimba-Ekwulumili Hall V; Enyimba-Ekwulumili Hall VI; Enyimba-Abaukwu Village Hall I; Enyimba-Abaukwu Village Hall II; Enyimba-Abaukwu Village Hall III; Enyimba Okija Hall I; Enyimba Okija Hall II; Enyimba -Umuokpoji Hall I; Enyimba -Umuokpoji Hall II; Enyimba -Umuokpoji Hall III; Enyimba -Umuoji Hall I; Enyimba -Umuoji Hall II
Aba South	Ngwa	Ngwa - Ehime Hall I; Ngwa - Ehime Hall II; Ngwa - Uga Hall; Ngwa-Akabo Hall I; Ngwa-Akabo Hall II; Ngwa-Akabo Hall III; Ngwa-Nkwerre Hall I; Ngwa-Nkwerre Hall II; Ngwa-Nkwerre Hall III; Ngwa-Ndoki Road Prim. School I; Ngwa-Ndoki Road Prim. School II; Ngwa-Ndoki Road Prim. School III; Ngwa-Agulu Peoples Hall I; Ngwa-Agulu Peoples Hall II; Ngwa-Agulu Peoples Hall III; Ngwa-Agulu Peoples Hall IV; Ngwa-Friends Vacational Coll I; Ngwa-Friends Vacational Coll II; Ngwa- Okagwe Item Hall I; Ngwa- Okagwe Item Hall II; Ngwa- Okagwe Item Hall III; Ngwa-Ihioma Hall I; Ngwa-Ihioma Hall II; Ngwa-Amaufuru Village Hall I; Ngwa-Amaufuru Village Hall II; Ngwa-Amaufuru Village Hall III; Ngwa-Ugo Commercial College I; Ngwa-Ugo Commercial College II; Ngwa-Ugo Commercial College III; Ngwa-Umunneise Village Hall; Ngwa-Umuagbai East Primary School I; Ngwa-Umuagbai East Primary School II; Ngwa-Umuagbai East Primary School III; Ngwa-Umuagbai East Primary School IV; Ngwa-Holy Cross College; Ngwa-Umuagbai West Prim. School
Aba South	Ohazu I	Ohazu I Akoli Hall I; Ohazu I Akoli Hall II; Ohazu I Akoli Hall III; Ohazu I Akoli Hall IV; Ohazu I Akoli Hall V; Ohazu I Akoli Prim. School I; Ohazu I Akoli Prim. School II; Ohazu I Akoli Prim. School III; Ohazu I Akoli Prim. School IV; Ohazu I-Akoli Prim. School V; Ohazu I-Akoli Prim. School VI; Ohazu I-Akoli Prim. School VII; Ohazu I-Akoli Prim. School VIII; Ohazu I-Akoli Prim. School IX; Ohazu I-Akoli Prim. School X; Ohazu I-Akoli Prim. School XI; Ohazu I-Agulana Road Prim. School I; Ohazu I-Agulana Road Prim. School II; Ohazu I-Agulana Road Prim. School III; Ohazu I-Agulana Road Prim. School IV; Ohazu I-Agulana Road Prim. School V; Ohazu I-Agulana Road Prim. School VI; Ohazu I-Agulana Road Prim. School VII; Ohazu I-Agulana Road Prim. School VIII; Ohazu I-Awkuzu Hall (105 Ngwa Road) I; Ohazu I-Awkuzu Hall (105 Ngwa Road) II; Ohazu I-Nnofia Hall I; Ohazu I-Nnofia Hall II; Ohazu I Ndoki Road Prim. School I; Ohazu I Ndoki Road Prim. School II
Aba South	Ohazu II	Ohazu II-Ndiegoro Village Hall I; Ohazu II-Ndiegoro Village Hall II; Ohazu II-Ndiegoro Village Hall III; Ohazu II-Ndiegoro Village Hall IV; Ohazu II-Ndiegoro Village Hall V; Ohazu II - Umuogele Pri. Sch. I; Ohazu II - Umuogele Pri. Sch. II; Ohazu II - Umuogele Pri. Sch. III; Ohazu II - Umuogele Pri. Sch. IV; Ohazu II - Ihieorji Secondary School I; Ohazu II - Ihieorji Secondary School II; Ohazu II - Ihieorji Secondary School III; Ohazu II - Ihieorji Secondary School IV; Ohazu II - Ihieorji Secondary School V; Ohazu II - Ihieorji Village School
Aba South	Igwebuike	Igwebuike-Umuagba I Sec. School I; Igwebuike-Umuagba I Sec. School II; Igwebuike-Umuagba I Sharp Brain Academy I; Igwebuike-Umuagba I Sharp Brain Academy II; Igwebuike-Ohabiam Sec. School I; Igwebuike-Ohabiam Sec. School II; Igwebuike-Ohabiam Sec. School III; Igwebuike-Ohabiam Sec. School IV; Igwebuike-Ohabiam Sec. School V; Igwebuike-Asaeme Village Hall I; Igwebuike-Asaeme Village Hall II; Igwebuike-Asaeme Village Hall III; Igwebuike-Umuagbai West Prim. School I; Igwebuike-Umuagbai West Prim. School II; Igwebuike-Nnentu Village Hall I; Igwebuike-Nnentu Village Hall II; Igwebuike-Nnentu Village Hall III; Igwebuike-Nnentu Village Hall IV; Igwebuike-Nnentu Village Hall V
Aba South	Ekeoha	Ekeoha-Asa Road Prim. School I; Ekeoha-Asa Road Prim. School II; Ekeoha-Asa Road Prim. School III; Ekeoha-Asa Road Prim. School IV; Ekeoha-Asa Road Prim. School V; Ekeoha-Asa Triangle Prim. School I; Ekeoha-Asa Triangle Prim. School II; Ekeoha-Asa Triangle Prim. School III; Ekeoha-Asa Triangle Prim. School IV; Ekeoha-Asa Triangle Prim. School V; Ekeoha-Ngwa Road Prim. Schl I; Ekeoha-Ngwa Road Prim. Schl II; Ekeoha-Ngwa Road Prim. Schl III; Ekeoha-Ngwa Road Prim. Schl IV; Ekeoha-Ngwa Road Prim. Schl V; Ekeoha-Ngwa Road Prim. Schl VI; Ekeoha-St. Joseph's College I; Ekeoha-St. Joseph's College II; Ekeoha-St. Joseph's College III; Ekeoha-Amichi Hall I; Ekeoha-Amichi Hall II; Ekeoha-Amichi Hall III; Ekeoha-Amichi Hall IV; Ekeoha-Old Court Prim. Schl. I; Ekeoha-Old Court Prim. Schl II; Ekeoha-Old Court Prim. Schl III
Aba South	Gloucester	Gloucester-Amaokwe Item Hall I; Gloucester-Amaokwe Item Hall II; Gloucester-Amaokwe Item Hall III; Gloucester-Amaokwe Item Hall IV; Gloucester-Amaokwe Item Hall V; Gloucester-Amaokwe Item Hall VI; Gloucester - Market Road Prim. School I; Gloucester - Market Road Prim. School II; Gloucester - Market Road Prim. School III; Gloucester - Market Road Prim. School IV; Gloucester - Market Road Prim. School V; Gloucester - Market Road Prim. School VI; Gloucester-Market Road Prim. School VII; Gloucester-Market Road Prim. School VIII; Gloucester-Market Road Prim. School IX; Gloucester-Market Road Prim. School X; Gloucester-Market Road Prim. School XI; Gloucester-Old Court Prim. School I; Gloucester-Old Court Prim. School II; Gloucester-Old Court Prim. School III; Gloucester-Old Court Prim. School IV; Gloucester-Old Court Prim. School V; Gloucester-Old Court Prim. School VI; Gloucester-Old Court Prim. School VII; Gloucester-Green Street Prim. School I; Gloucester-Green Street Prim. School II
Aba South	Mosque	Mosque -School Of Health I; Mosque -School Of Health II; Mosque -School Of Health III; Mosque -School Of Health IV; Mosque -School Of Health V; Mosque -School Of Health VI; Mosque -School Of Health VII; Mosque -Mosque. School I; Mosque -Mosque. School II; Mosque -Mosque. School III; Mosque -Mosque. School IV; Mosque Ehi Road Prim. Schl I; Mosque Ehi Road Prim. Schl II; Mosque Ehi Road Prim. Schl III; Mosque Ehi Road Prim. Schl IV; Mosque Ehi Road Prim. Schl V; Mosque Ehi Road Prim. Schl VI; Mosque Ehi Road Prim. Schl VII; Mosque Ehi Road Prim. Schl VIII; Mosque Nnewi Youth Hall I; Mosque Nnewi Youth Hall II; Mosque Nnewi Youth Hall III
Aba South	Aba River	Aba River-Etche Road, Primary School I; Aba River-Etche Road, Primary School II; Aba River-Etche Road, Primary School III; Aba River-Etche Road, Primary School IV; Aba River-Etche Road, Primary School V; Aba River-Etche Road, Primary School VI; Aba River-Etche Road, Primary School VII; Aba River-Obiora Road, Primary School I; Aba River-Obiora Road, Primary School II; Aba River-Obiora Road, Primary School III; Aba River-Obiora Road, Primary School IV; Aba River-Obiora Road, Primary School V; Aba River-Obiora Road, Primary School VI; Aba River-Obiora Road, Primary School VII; Aba River-Riverside Primary School I; Aba River-Riverside Primary School II; Aba River-Riverside Primary School III; Aba River-Ulasi Road Primary School I; Aba River-Ulasi Road Primary School II; Aba River-Ulasi Road Primary School III; Aba River-Danfodio Road Primary School I; Aba River-Danfodio Road Primary School II; Aba River-Danfodio Road Primary School III; Aba River-Danfodio Road Primary School IV; Aba River-Ndoki Road Primary School I; Aba River-Ndoki Road Primary School II; Aba River Ndoki Road Primary School III
Aba South	Aba Town Hall	Aba Town Hall - Aba Town Hall I; Aba Town Hall - Aba Town Hall II; Aba Town Hall - Aba Town Hall III; Aba Town Hall - Aba Town Hall IV; Aba Town Hall - Constitution Crescent Prim. Schl I; Aba Town Hall - Constitution Crescent Prim. Schl II; Aba Town Hall - Constitution Crescent Prim. Schl III; Aba Town Hall - Constitution Crescent Prim. Schl IV; Aba Town Hall - Constitution Crescent Prim. Schl V; Aba Town Hall - Aba Recreation Club I; Aba Town Hall - Aba Recreation Club II; Aba Town Hall - Aba Recreation Club III; Aba Town Hall - Aba Recreation Club IV; Aba Town Hall Park Road Play Ground I.; Aba Town Hall Park Road Play Ground II.; Aba Town Hall - Red Cross Premises I; Aba Town Hall - Red Cross Premises II; Aba Town Hall - Red Cross Premises III; Aba Town Hall - Red Cross Premises IV; Aba Town Hall - Hospital Road Prim. Schl I; Aba Town Hall - Hospital Road Prim. Schl II
Arochukwu	Ovukwu	Atan Abam I/ Atan Primary School; Atan Abam II/ Mkt. Square Atan Abam; Ndi Oji Abam I Cent. Sch. Ndi Oji Abam.; Ndi Oji Abam II Cent. Sch. Ndi Oji Abam.; Ndi Oji Anbam III & IV/ Cent. Sch. Ndi Oji Abam; Ndi Oji Okereke/Prim. Sch. Ndi Okereke; Ndi Okwara/Ndi Okwara Hall; Ndi Okorie/Prim. Sch. Ndi Okorie; Ndi Okorie Village Sq. Ndi Okorie; Atan Abam III/Onicha Hall; Eziafor/Eziafor Town Hall; Ndi Oji Ahuma/ Ahuma Vill Sq.
Arochukwu	Ohaeke	Ndi Aworo/Ndi Irohadima Abam Prim. Svhl. II; Ndi Arunsi Ogbaga/Ndi Arunsi Hall; Ohaeke I & IX Idima Abam Prim Sch. Campi; Ohaeke II/Public Hall Idima; Ohaeke III /Isi Okwasi Hall; Ohaeke IV & VIII/ Ndi Okorie Hall; Ohaeke V/Itum Beach Hall; Ohaeke VI Ndi Agwumu Comm Sch.; Ohaeke VII/I Onu Ogo Ndite Hall; Ndi Ekete/Ndiekete Hall; Nzerem/Oruocha/Oruocha Hall; Elu Ogo- Ndi Otu Hall.; Ndi Nnanu Vill Hall Ndi Nnanu; Idima Beach Onuasu/Mkt. Square Onuasu
Arochukwu	Ohafor I	Ozu Abam I/ Cent. Sch. Ozu Abam; Ozu Abam II &/IV Cent. Sch. Ozu Abam; Ozu Abam III Central Sch. Ozu Abam.; Ndi Ebelagu/Ndi Ememe/Comm. Sch. Ndi Ememe; Amauru I/Comm. Primary School Amuru; Amauru II/Eziukwu Hall; Okweji/Okweji Mem. School; Ndi Irioma/Amaetiti Hall
Arochukwu	Ohafor II	Ndi Ebe I/Comm. Prim. Schl Ndi Ebe; Ndi Ebe II- Obioma Hall, Ndi Ebe.; Ndi Ojiudwo /Ndi Inya/Comm. School Ndi Ojiugwo; Amaeke I/Comm. School Amaeke; Amaeke II/Comm. School Amaeke; Amaogbu -Amaogbu Vill. Sq.; Nkpurankpu(Ndi Ebe II) Nkpurankpu Village Square.; Ndi Ojiugwo/Ime Ogo Hall; Amaeke III& IV /Ogo Hall
Arochukwu	Arochukwu I	Ujari I/Presby. Hall Ujari; Ujari II/Awada Ndi Udensi; Ujari III/Ogwogo Hall Amasu; Amasu I & III- Vill Sq. Amasu.; Amasu II/Village Square Amasu; Amannagwu II/Amannagwu Hall; Amannagwu II/Village Square Amannagwu; Amannagwu III/Village Square Amannagwu; Amannagwu -Ezeakuma Pri Sch.; Utughugwu I/Mgbala Ekpe Utughugwu; Utughugwu II/Village Square Utughugwu; Ogbogwu I & II Ndi Onoh Hall; Govt. Area I/Mary Slessor Sec. Sch.; Govt. Area II/College Of Education Technical.; Ibom I & II Ibom Hall; Ibom II/Aggrey Primary School
Arochukwu	Arochukwu II	Obinkita I/Aro Cent. School I; Obinkita II/Aro Cent. School II; Obinkita New Layout/Akama Road - New Market; Utughuyi I & II/Mgbala Ekpe Hall; Amukwa/Village Square Hall Amukwa; Amankwu/Amankwu Hall; Amankwu Pri. Sch, Amoba.; Ugwuavor - Mgbala Ekpe Ugwuavor..; Isinkpu - Mgbala Ekpe Ugwuavor.; Ugboi/Eziukwu Hall Ugbo; Oriri Council Hall Oriri, Aro.; Obinkita III/Obinkita Hall; Ugwuavor II/Ugwuavor Cent. Square; Oriri II - I. M. T; Amoba II/Mgbala Ekpe Amoba; Ugbo II/Ugbo Cent. Square
Arochukwu	Ikwun Ihechiowa	Obinto I/Ihe Cent. School; Obinto II/Obinto Village Hall; Obichie/Awada Ndi Ole; Ndi Okpo I Ndi Okpo Primary School; Ndi Okpo II/Unity Hall. Ndi Okpo; Ndi Okpo III/Ndi Agwu Hall Ndi Okpo; Atan I- Ndi Ogboro Sq.; Amaogurunsi I/Amao Gurunsi Hall; Amaogurunsi II/Amao Gurunsi Hall; Umuye I/Umuye Comm. Sch; Umuzomgbo I/Umuzomgbo Comm. Sch; Umuzomgbo II Amankwu Hall.; Uburu /Uburu Village Hall; Umuye II/Ekelu Ogo Hall; Umuye III - Ekelu Ogo Hall Atan II Women Hall Atan.; Umuzomgbo III/Umuzomgbo Comm. Sch
Arochukwu	Eleoha Ihechiowa	Okpo I/Okpo Comm. Sch; Okpo II/Obichie Town Hall; Okpo III/Amangwu Town Hall; Amafia/Amaetiti Prim. Sch.; Achara I/Eziukwu Village Hall; Achara II/Club Hall Achara; Achara III/Diogukwu Mem. Sch; Umuchi I/Ndi Agwu Okpo; Umuchi II/Awada Ndi Apia; Umuchi III/Ndi Okwun Ama Square; Umuchi IV & VI Utility Hall.; Umuchi V/Umunnabuo Prim. Sch; Amanmiri I/Ada Eziukwu Amanmiri; Amanmiri II/Ugwueze Hall; Amanmiri III/Ndi Okwuagwu Town Hall; Ebem Okpo/Ebem Okpo Town Hall; Achara IV/ Village Hall Achara; Amaiyi Okpo/Amaiyi Okpo Village Hall; Amafia II/ Amaetiti Primary School
Arochukwu	Ututu	Nkpakpi/ Nkpakpi Hall; Amaeke I Amaeke Hall; Amaeke II- Amaeke Hall; Amasa/Amasa Village Hall; Amankwu I/Eleoha Village Square; Amankwu II/Amankawu Village Square; Amodu I/Mgbala Ogo Village Square; Amaodu II - Onu Ogo Obiagwulu.; Obiagwulu I/Onu Ogo Obiagwulu I; Obiagwulu II/Onu Ogo Obiagwulu II; Ukwuakwu I/Ukwuakwu Hall; Ukwuakwu II/Mgbala Ogo Ukwuakwu; Abuma I/Ututu Comm. Prim. Sch; Amakofia I & II/Amakofia Postal Agency; Obijoma I & III/Obijoma Village Square; Obijima II/Eziama Village Square; Obiene I/Obiene Cent. School; Obiene II/Obiene Village Square; Ubila-Amaetiti/Ubila-Amaetiti Prim. Sch; Eziohu Settlement/Eziohun Settlement Square; Obiagwulu III/Ndeweni Village Square; Abuma II/Abuma Hall
Arochukwu	Isu	Obieze/Ohabuike Prim. Sch; Amukabi/Health Centre Isu; Iheosu/Obimba Comm..School; Aba -Isu/Utughaiyi Comm. Sch; Amakarama /Health Centre; Amachi/Utughayi Comm. School
Arochukwu	Arochukwu III	Atani I/Atani Hall; Atani II/Mgbala Ekpe Atani; Atani III & IV/Ndi Elekwa Hall Atani; Amangwu /Mgbala Ekpe Hall; Amuvi I/Amuvi Comm. Prim. Sch; Amuvi II/Ascetan Comm. Hall Amuvi; Asaga I /Mgbala Ekpe Umuoti; Atani Agbo/Ndi Mgbeke Hall; Asaga II/Mgbala Ekp Umuoti; Amangwu II/Amangwu Square; Asaga III/Asaga Square
Bende	Amankalu/Akoliufu	Amankalu Alayi-Amankalu Prim. Sch I; Amankalu Alayi-Amankalu Prim. Sch II; Amankalu Alayi-Amankalu Prim. Sch III; Amankalu Alayi-Amankalu Prim. Sch IV; Amaoji-Amankalu-Amaigwe Village I; Amaoji-Amankalu-Amaigwe Village II; Amaoji-Amankalu-Amaigwe Village III; Amaokwe Elu-Central School Alayi I; Amaokwe Elu-Central School Alayi II; Ezialayi-Ezialayi Comm. Sch I; Ezialayi-Ezialayi Comm. Sch II; Umuenyere-Umuenyere Prim. Sch I; Umuenyere-Umuenyere Prim. Sch II; Amaokwe-Amankalu- Amaoku Prim. Sch; Amaokwe-Amankalu- Eze Okwukwu Prim. Sch; Amaekealayi-Agbor Akoli Village; Amaekealayi-Amaeke Mkt. Square; Akolifu-Amankuma Eze Alayi Village Square; Amankalu-Okpufu Village Hall
Bende	Bende	Etitiulo-Etitiulo Prim. Sch; Amaogwu-Amaogwu Town Hall; Agbomiri-Agbomiri Town Hall; Ndiokorieukwu-Ndiokorieukwu Town Hall; Okputong-Okputong Town Hall I; Okputong-Okputong Town Hall II; Okputong-Okputong Town Hall III; Okputong-Ndiekeugo Village Hall; Okputong-Motor Park Bende; Amaoba/Okputong-Afo Bende Mkt. Square; Amaoba-Central School Bende; Umuorie-Umuorie Town Hall; Onuinyang-Onuinyang Village Hall; Ukpom-Ukpom Village Square; Okporoeenyi-Okporoenyi Central School; Okporoeenyi-Isinkpu Village Hall
Bende	Ugwueke/Ezeukwu	Amaeze-Amaeze Prim. Sch; Ndi Elu-Ndi Elu Prim. Sch I; Ndi Elu-Ndi Elu Prim. Sch II; Amaba/Ugwueke-Amaba/Ugwueeke Cent. Sch; Amaba/Ugwueke-Amaba Comm. School; Isieke-Isieke Mkt Square; Ndi Agbo-Ndi Agbo Village Hall; Amaokai-Amaokai Town Hall; Ezeukwu-Central Sch. Ezeukwu; Ezeukwu-.Ezenta Town Hall; Ezeukwu-.Amangwu Village Hall Ezeukwu; Ezeukwu-.Amangwu Village Hall
Bende	Igbere 'A'	Onuibina-Onuibina Prim. Sch I; Onuibina-Onuibina Prim. Sch II; Onuibina-Ulonkuma; Eziigbere-Eziigbere Comm. Sch I; Eziigbere-Eziigbere Comm. Sch II; Onuibina-Ulo Nkuma; Amankalu-Amankalu Prim. Sch I; Amankalu-Amankalu Prim. Sch II; Amankalu-Amankalu Prim. Sch III; Amankalu-Okposi Prim. Sch; Umuisi- Umuisi Village Sq. I; Umuisi- Umuisi Village Hall I I; Eluokwe- Umuisi Hall
Bende	Igbere 'B'	Okposi-Eziama Hall; Okposi-Agbo Igbere Village Hall; Agbo Igbere-Agbo Igbere Village Hall; Eluokwe-Comm. School Eluokwe; Ezi- Igbere Amaoji; Eluokwe-Ibinata Hall I; Eluokwe-Ibinata Hall II; Amato-Amato Comm. Sch; Amato-Amoji Hall; Ohumola-Ohumola Vill. Hall. I; Ohumola-Ohumola Vill. Sq. II
Bende	Item A	Amaokwe - Centre Sch. Amaokwe; Amaokwe - Afor Mkt. Square I; Amaokwe - Afor Mkt. Square II; Amaokwe - Comm. Sch. Amaokwe; Umunneato - Umunneato Cent. School; Umunneato - Voc. Training Centre; Amaeke - Amaeke Item Town Hall; Apanu - Comm. School Apanu; Apanu - Egodinohia Hall Apanu I; Apanu - Egodinohia Hall Apanu II; Amaekepu - Comm. Sch Amaekepu I; Amaekepu - Comm. Sch Amaekepu II; Amaekepu - Amaekepu Mkt. Square; Amaekepu - Amaekepu Comm. School I; Amaekepu - Amaekepu Comm. School II; Apanu - Amaolu Hall
Bende	Item B	Ezi Ufu Okoko - Ezi Ufu Hall; Ezi Ufu Okoko - Ekenta Square; Okoko - Central Sch. Okoko; Okoko - Amaiyi Hall; Umukoma Item - Umukoma Hall; Okoko - Iketenwe Hall; Okagwe - Central Sch. Okagwe; Amaigbo Okoko - Amaigbo Pri. Sch.; Amaigbo Okoko - Comm. Tech. Sch. I; Amaigbo Okoko - Comm. Tech. Sch. II
Bende	Item C	Akanu - Pri. Sch. Akanu; Akanu - Akanu Mkt. Square; Elugwu - Elugwu Akanu I; Elugwu - Elugwu Akanu II; Elugwu - Elugwu Akanu III; Umuakpa - Umuaka Women Hall; Okai - Okai Mkt. Square; Okai - Umuakpa Pri. Sch.
Bende	Itumbauzo	Umuokpe - Umuokpe Village Hall; Amaeke - Amaeke Village Hall I; Amaeke - Amaeke Village Hall II; Ndioti - Ndioti Village Hall; Ntalakwu - Central Sch. Ntalakwu I; Ntalakwu - Central Sch. Ntalakwu II; Ntalakwu - Central Sch. Ntalakwu III; Akanu - Akanu Village Hall; Ndiwo - Mkt. Square Ndiwo I; Ndiwo - Mkt. Square Ndiwo II; Okopedi - Comm. Sch. Campus One; Amaudo - Amaudo Mbukwa Hall; Okopedi - Comm. Sch. Campus Two; Nkporo - Nkporo Ubibia; Amaba - Comm. Sch. Amaba; Ntubi - Ntubi Ubibia; Ndiuwa - Ndiuwa Village Hall
Bende	Ozuitem	Etiti Ozu - Etiti Ozu Pri. Sch. I; Etiti Ozu - Etiti Ozu Pri. Sch. II; Etiti Ozu - Etiti Ozu Pri. Sch. III; Amaeke - Amaeke Isiegbu Pri. Sch.; Amaeke - Amaeke Village Square; Amankwo - Central Sch. Ozuitem; Amagbo - Amagbo Village Hall I; Amagbo - Amagbo Village Hall II; Amankwo - Amankwo Village Hall; Enemba - Enemba Pri. Sch. I; Enemba - Enemba Pri. Sch. II; Upe - Elugwumba I; Upe - Elugwumba II; Alaoma - Alaoma Pri. Sch. I; Alaoma - Alaoma Pri. Sch. II
Bende	Umuhu / Ezechi	Umuhu - Comm. Sch. Umuhu; Umuhu - Amachi Pri. Sch.; Umuhu - Amangwu Pri. Sch.; Umuhu - Amabuelu Village Hall; Umuokwe - Comm. Sch. Umuokwe I; Umuokwe - Comm. Sch. Umuokwe II; Umuokwe - Comm. Sch. Umuokwe III; Ezechi - Ezechi Pri. Sch. I; Ezechi - Ezechi Pri. Sch. II; Ezechi - Amazu Civic Centre
Bende	Umu - Imenyi	Amaoji - Comm. Sch. Amaoji; Akoli - Central School Akoli I; Akoli - Central School Akoli II; Akoli - Central School Akoli III; Lodu - Comm. School Lodu; Lohum - Central School Lohum I; Lohum - Central School Lohum II; Amaoji - Pri. Sch. Amaoji; Amaegbuato - Amaegbuato Pri. Sch.; Amaegbuato - Nweke Square; Amaegbuato - Umuegwu Nkpa Hall; Amaegbuato - Agboiyi Village Square; Odua - Odu Nkpa Village Hall; Umuimenyi - Comm. School Umuede; Nkpa - Nkpa Ukwa Village Hall; Nkpa - Amaedukwu Village Hall; Umuopara - Umuopara Town Hall; Umualukcha - Umualukcha Town Hall; Amaimo - Amaimo Town Hall; Amaokpu - Pri. Sch. Amaokpu; Amaediaba - Comm. Pri. Sch. Amaediaba; Amaediaba - Amaediaba Mkt. Square I; Amaediaba - Amaediaba Mkt. Square II; Amaohoro - Comm. Sec. Sch. Amaohoro; Ugwunkpa - Comm. Sec. Sch. Ugwunkpa; Ugwunkpa - Ugwunkpa Hall; Ugwunkpa - Awu Hall
Bende	Uzuakoli	Amamba - Central Sch. Amamba / Agbozu; Amamba - Amamba Village Hall I; Amamba - Amamba Village Hall II; Amamba - Amaozu Village Hall; Ngwu - Ngwu Comm. School; Ngwu - Ngwu Town Hall; Amankwo - Amankwo Village Hall I; Amankwo - Amankwo Village Hall II; Eluama - Practising School Uzuakoli I; Eluama - Practising School Uzuakoli II; Eluama - Mkt. Square Uzuakoli; Eluama - Ozuitem Rd. Motor Park; Eluama - T. T. C Uzuakoli; Leprosy Set - Sch. Assembly Lerp. Square; Amuhi - Amuhi Town Hall; Amamba - Comm. Sch. Amamba / Agbozu
Ikwuano	Oloko I	Awomukwu Comm. Sch Amomukwu; Amizi Town Hall Amizi I; Amizi Town Hall Amizi III; Awomukwu Cent. Sch.; Okoro Na Ete Hall, Okoro Na Ete; Oloko Comm. School Oloko; Mbarama Okpu Oloko - Okpu Oloko; Community School Umugo - Umugo; Okoro Na Ete Hall - Okoro Na Ete
Ikwuano	Oloko II	Azuiyi Square - Azuiyi; Community School Usaka Eleogu; Nchara Central School - Nchara I; Nchara Central School - Nchara II; Nchara Community School - Nchara I; Obuohia - Okike Community School, Obuohia I; Obuohia - Okike Community School, Obuohia II; Nchara Community School - Nchara II
Ikwuano	Ibere I	Ihim Community School - Ihim; Amuro Central School; Elemaga Village Square; Iberenta Community School I; Isiala Ibere Community Hall; Inyila Community School; Health Central Ahia Orie; Iberenta Community School II
Ikwuano	Ibere II	Obuohia Community School I; Obuohia Community School II; Obuohia Community School III; Ngwugwo Comm. School; Nkalunta Community School I; Iyalu Community School; Itunta Obuoro Community School; Obuoro Community School; Nkalunta Community School II; Umuemenike Village Square
Ikwuano	Oboro I	Amawom Central School; Amawom Community School I; Mbaraukwu Umuariaga Village Square; Umuagbalu Community School.; Umuariaga Community School I; Umuokowo Village Square; Umuariaga Community School II; Amawom Community School II
Ikwuano	Oboro II	Amaoba Central School; Amaoba - Ime Village Square I; Amaoba - Ime Village Square II; Umudike Community School I; Umudike Community School II; Abia State University ( Aice Umudike); Federal University Of Agric. Umudike I; Federal University Of Agric. Umudike II; Federal University Of Agric. Umudike III; National Root Crops Research Institute, Umudike
Ikwuano	Oboro III	Ndoro Central School - Ndoro I; Ndoro Central School - Ndoro II; Okwe Community School - Okwe I; Okwe Community School - Okwe II; Ahuwa Community School - Ahuwa I; Ntalakwu Village Square - Ntalakwu; Ahuwa Community School - Ahuwa II; Ahuwa Community School - Ahuwa III
Ikwuano	Oboro IV	Local Govt. Headquarters - Isiala Oboro I; Ogbuebule Central School - Ogbuebule I; Ogbuebule Central School - Ogbuebule II; Ekebedi Community School - Ekebedi; Nnono Central School - Nnono I; Nnono Central School - Nnono II; Nnono Central School - Nnono III; Ikwueke Central School - Ikwueke I; Ajatakiri Community School - Ajatakiri; Ikwueke Central School - Ikwueke II; Local Govt. Headquarters - Isiala Oboro II
Ikwuano	Ariam	Ariam Usaka Community School - Ariam Usaka; Ndiorie Village Square - Ndiorie; Ekpiri Elu - Elu Cent. School - Ekpiri Elu - Elu; Obeama Ariam Model School - Obeama; Azunchayi Village Square - Azunchayi; Ekpiri Alala Village Square - Ekpiri Alala; Ariam Usaka Comm. Sch (Ariam Elu - Elu); Obeama Village Square - Obeama; Ariam Market Square Hall - Ariam; Ndiuko Ariam Town Hall
Ikwuano	Usaka	Ariam Usaka Central School Amaegbu; Obugwu Village Square - Obugwu; Oboni - Upa Community School - Oboni - Upa; Usaka Community School - Usaka; Comm. Primary School Ekwelu Usaka I; Comm. Primary School Ekwelu Usaka II; Ndieke Village Square - Ndieke; Ndiama Nkumekpo Hall - Ndiama Nkumekpo
Isiala Ngwa North	Amasaa Nsulu	Umunkolo Amachi - Village Square - Umunkolo; Amachi - Civic Hall Amachi; Eziama - Pri. Sch. Eziama; Usaka Umuofor - Pri. Sch. Usaka Umuofor; Umuosonyeike - Pri. Sch. Umuosonyeike; Ohuhu I - Community Sch. Ohuhu; Ohuhu II - Village Hall Umueze; Aroachara - Village Square Aroachara; Mbaraogbom / Umuamata / Umuerogha - C/S Mbaraogbom; Eziukwu / Umuorenye / Umuelema - Civil Hall Umuelema; Umuogele / Umuodu / Umuogu I - Mkt. Square Umuogele; Umuogele / Umuodu / Umuogu II- Mkt. Square Umuogele; Amachi II - Umuogele Village Hall
Isiala Ngwa North	Umunna Nsulu	Okpuloukwu / Umuoma / Umuikri - C. S Okpuloukwu; Umuosu I - Cent. School Umuosu I; Umuosu I - Cent. School Umuosu II; Umuode I - Cent. School Umuode; Umuode II - Cent. School Umuode; Ikputu - Central School Ikputu; Ihie / Amaorji / Umungwa / Umunkputu / Umudeze - Cent. Sch. Ubaha; Umuawuda / Ohukwu / Umunkputu - Village Square Umuawuda; Umuosouga / Umuome - Village Square Umuome; Ulelu / Umukasoanya / Umugba / Agburuike - Mbubo Central Sch.; Elubi - School Hall Elubi; Umuogu - Village Hall Umuogu; Umuodeche - Village Hall Umuodeche; Ihie/Amorji/Ekpiri/Umugwa/ Umunkputu/Umuodechie Central School Ubaha
Isiala Ngwa North	Isiala Nsulu	Okpuala / Amawom / Achara - Eziala Mkt. Square; Umuelu / Ogbuga / Umundukwe / Umuagu - Central Sch. Eziala; Umuomaikwu/Eluama/ Amaiyi/Umuikpaba Community School Umuomaikwu; Umuezegu - Village Square Umuezegu; Umuala - Umuala Nsulu Central School; Umuati - Comm. School Umuati; Agburuike / Achara / Ugba - Agburuike C / Sch.; Mbarankwa / Amaugba - Comm. Central Sch. Agburuike; Umuezegu - Village Hall Umuokpoke; Umuomaikewu II - Umuokpara Village Hall
Isiala Ngwa North	Ngwa Ukwu I	Eziama Osusu I - Council Hall Ahiafor; Umungasi - Comm. Sch. Osusu; Egbelu/Umuosi/Umuawuru/ Umuonyia - Umuawuru Village Square; Egbelu / Umunwakwo /Umuzo - Village Square Okpuneme; Mgbedeala / Amorji / Amaugba - Amaugba Village Square; Amaiyi - Comm. Sch. Amaiyi; Okpuodu - Village Square Okpuodu; Umuogba - Village Square Umuogba; Amauzu - Community Sch. Amauzu; Okpuala Ngwa - Village Hall Okpuala Ngwa; Umuobiri - Village Square Umuobiri; Okpumuo - Community Hall, Okpumuo; Umuapiti - Village Hall Umuapiti; Umuolike - Village Hall Umuolike; Umuamechi - Umuehilegbu C/School Abayi; Umuigbe / Umukenyi /Isiokporo / Umulelu - C/Sch. Abayi; Umungwu / Umuobia / Umuosi / Umule - Group Sch. Abayi; Umuawada I - Village Square Umuawada; Umuawada II - Village Hall Umuawada
Isiala Ngwa North	Ngwa Ukwu II	Umuala - Civil Hall Umuala; Umuarugwu - C/ Sch. Ahiaba Ubi; Amapu Ngwa / Umogidi / Okpunairem - Ahiaba Ubi Court Sq.; Umuchima / Okorocha - Comm. Sch. Umuchima; Ekenegbedi - Ekenegbedi Village Hall; Obikaabia I - Comm. Sch. Obikabia; Obikaabia II - Comm. Sch. Obikabia; Umuigwe - Ahiaeketa Mkt. Square; Umuamaigwe / Umuotutu - Village Hall Umuamaigwe; Umuegwuala / Umumba - C/S Ahaiba Okpuala; Ihieorji - Village Hall Ihieorji; Eziala /Umuobasi - Village Hall Umuobasi; Umumba / Umule / Umuzaku - Village Hall Umumba; Umuegwuala/Umumba II - Community School Ahiaba Okpuala; Umuchima / Umuokorocha II - C/S Umuchima
Isiala Ngwa North	Ihie	Ihie Umunnachi - Village Square Umunnachi; Egbelu Ihie - Village Square Egbelu; Umuode - Village Square - Umuode; Amaogwugwu - Village Square Amaogwugwu; Ihie High School; Umuomai Ihie - Village Hall Umuomai
Isiala Ngwa North	Amasaa Ntigha	Umuekpe / Umuisukwu - Group Sch. Eziama; Umuogwoka - Village Square Umuogwoka; Umule / Umaladim / Osikai - Village Hall Umule Ahiankwo; Umukalu - Village Hall Ukwuihe; Okpuala / Umunachi / Mbaraugba - Village Okpuala; Abu/Umuololo - Vill. Hall Abu; Umuochi / Umuikea - Village Square Umuochi; Umuama / Umuokoro - Cent. Sch. Eziama; Umuoke / Ogba / Umungwoli / Umuoso - Village Hall - Umuoke; Umuevo / Umuehihie - Cent. School Eziama; Umuola - Village Square Umuola; Eziudo / Obingwa / Osina Irem - Village Hall - Osi Na Irem; Umugba / Umuogidi - C/Sch. Avor Campus II; Umuerim / Uga - C/Sch. Avor Campus I; Umuogele - C/Sch. Umuogele
Isiala Ngwa North	Amapu Ntigha	Umuokatu - Village Hall Umuokatu; Umunka - Village Square Umunka; Umuobia / Umuebeyi - Village Square Umuobia; Umuokwa - Village Square Umuokwa; Imerem - Ukwude Imerem Village Square; Umualata - Village Square Umualata; Umuodeghala / Umutu - Village Hall Umutu / Umuodeghala; Umuokuzu - Village Hall Umuokuzu; Imerem II - Ukwude Imerem Village Square
Isiala Ngwa North	Umuoha	Uratta Umurandu I - St David's Sch. Uratta; Uratta Umurandu II - Village Square Umuolike; Uratta Eziama I - Village Square Umuomagu; Uratta Eziama II - Village Square Nkworji; Amaekpu - Village Square Amaekpu Umuamata; Amaekpu Isiahia - C / Hall Amaekpu Isiahia; Ichi - Comm. Sch. Ichi; Amaputa - Comm. Sch. Amaputa; Amapu - Community School Amapu; Amapu II - C/Sch. Apuna Ekpu; Amapu III - Comm. Sch. Amapu; Amapu IV - Village Square Umuokenkwe; Amapu V - Comm. Sch. Apu Na Ekpu
Isiala Ngwa North	Mbawsi / Umuomainta	Igbere Quarters - Nbawsi C/S (Faith Terbanacle); Igbere Quarters - Handicraft Centre; Nbawsi Town - Nbawsi Motor Park; Umuomainta / Okpuala - Village Hall Okpuala; Umuelenwa - Comm. Sch. Umuelenwa; Umunkolo - Village Hall Umunkolo; Umuezenta I - Village Hall Umuezenta; Umuezenta II - Village Hall Umuezenta; Umunkpeyi I - Village Hall Umunkpeyi; Umunkpeyi II - Village Hall Umunkpeyi; Umuelemoha - Village Hall Umuelemoha
Isiala Ngwa South	Amaise / Amaise Anaba	Umuacharata Village Hall.; Mgbedeala - Village Hall; Umuacha Village Hall.; Umuika - Community School; Court Hall Premises - Court Hall Premises; Mkpuka - Community School; Owerrinta/ Umuogbu Junction I.; Amaokpu - Community School; Aga Village Hall; Nnoyi - Community I; Nnoyi - Community II; Umuekene Village Hall.; Ugba Junction - Ugba Junction; Owerrinta/ Umuogbu Junction II.
Isiala Ngwa South	Ngwaobi	Ngwaobi - Central School; Amaudara - Village Hall I; Umunta - Village Hall; Umudogu - Village Hall; Umuala - Village Hall; Umueme - Village Hall; Umuwoma - Village Hall; Ngwaobi - Comm. School
Isiala Ngwa South	Mbutu Ukwu	Nkwoala - Village Hall; Umuojima Ukwu - Village Hall; Umuokere Village Hall.; Egbelu - Central School; Umugwor - Village Hall; Umuoleke - Village Hall; Umuoleke - Village Square; Umuocheala - Sec. Comm. School I; Water Side - Council Hall Water Side; Owerrinta - St Peter's Sch.; Owerrinta - St Epharaims / Owerrinta Girls School
Isiala Ngwa South	Mbutu Ngwa	Amankwo - Village Hall; Amankwo/Ahiaofor Village Hall.; Mbutu Ngwa - Mbutu Ngwa Pri. Sch.; Mbutu Ngwa - Mbutu Ngwa Sec. Sch.; Obiekwesu - Village Hall; Umuduru - Village Hall (I); Okpungwu - Village Hall; Umuezeocha Village Hall; Umuichi - Village Hall; Uhum - Village Hall; Mbutu Ngwa - Secondary School (II); Umuduru - Village Hall (II); Mbutu Ngwa - Pri. Sch. (II); Umuichi - Village Hall (II); Umuosoala - Village Hall
Isiala Ngwa South	Ehina Guru Osokwa	Umuezu - Umuezu Hall; Umuada - Village Hall; Umuabali Village Hall.; Umubu - Umubu Hall; Umuetegha Central Sch.; Umuehim Village Square; Umuguru - Village Hall; Amaiyi - Central School (I); Amaiyi - Central School (II); Ebeiyi - Central School; Ndiolumbe - C. P. S; Ndiolumbe - Village Square; Umuohia Village Hall; Umuokechi Village Hall; Umunkpo - Village Hall; Akpurunta - Village Hall; Ahiafor / Umuru - Village Hall; Ikem Civil Center - Ikem Civil Center; Ikem Civil Center - Nkwo Mkt. Square; Umuagwu Meeting Centre Umuagwu.
Isiala Ngwa South	Akunekpu Eziama Na Obuba	Umuokogu - Village Hall; Umuokegbe - Village Hall; Obuba - Central School; Umubefu - Village Hall; Kputuke - Village Hall; Umungalagu - Village Hall; Umunkpayi - Central Sch. I; Umunkpayi - Central Sch. II; Umuokiri - Central Sch.; Umunevo - Central Sch.; Umunko - Village Hall; Amaku - Central School; Umuejia - Village Hall; Ohuhu Ekwuru - Central Sch.; Umulelu - Village Hall; Mgbokanta - Village Hall; Umuamacha - Village Hall; Nvosi - High Sch.; Umuaro Village Centre Umuaro
Isiala Ngwa South	Omoba	Umuire - Village Hall; Umuezechi - Village Hall; Omoba - Omoba Motor Park; Umuokoroukwu - Village Hall; Umuokea - Village Hall; Omoba - Central School; Umuagu - Village Hall; Umugba - Village Hall; Umuokegwu (I) - Village Hall; Amapu - Village Hall; Umuekegwu Village Hall.; Umuamosi - Village Hall; Egbelu - Egbelu Umuokegwu Village Hall
Isiala Ngwa South	Ovungwu	Umuakpor - Village Hall; Umuapu - Central School; Amato / Umuapu - Comm. Sch.; Ovungwa - Comm. Council Hall; Agbaragwu - Central Sch. I; Umunkwo - Village Hall Umunkwo; Okpuala - Village Hall; Amabua - Central Sch.; Okpungwu - Village Hall; Umotiri - Village Hall; Umuaja - Central Sch.; Ngwama - Comm. Hall; Umuojiji - Village Hall; Umuokoro - Central Sch.; Ekenekpu - Village Hall
Isiala Ngwa South	Ovuokwu	Obiekwesu - Village Hall; Amucha - Amucha Hall; Umuawa - Central School; Ovorji - Central School; Amairi - Community School; Umuene - Umuene Hall; Okpuala - Primary School; Umueleghele - Village Hall; Isiekenta - Central School; Obichuku - Village Hall
Isiala Ngwa South	Okporo Ahaba	Umuhie - Central School; Umuoke - Central School; Mbutu Umuoke - Village Hall; Ntighauzor - Comm. Sch.; Mba - Comm. Sch.; Umuajuju - Village Hall; Umuajuju - Health Centre; Umuosi - Village Hall; Okpuhie - Central Sch.; Umuakuma - Central Sch.; Umuenere - Village Hall
Isuikwuato	Imenyi	Amiyi Evening Market - Amiyi; Ahaba Central School - Amiyi; Ahaba Community School - Amiyi; Ahaba Ehuma Square - Ehuma; Amahia Town Hall - Amaogudu; Ihenzu Village Square - Ihenzu; Ahaba Imeyi Secondary School - Ahaba; Amamogudu Village Square - Amaogundu; Obioha Ihenzu Village Square - Ihenzu; Ndioguru Town Square - Amiyi Ahaba
Isuikwuato	Ezere	Ezere Central School - Ezere; Ozara Central School -Ozara; Umuagu Village Square - Ozara; Umuakwua Community School - Ozara; Ozara Railway Station - Ozara; Ovim Community School - Umudinja; Amune Village Square - Amune; Orua Square - Amune; Oriendu Market Square - Obayi; Spence Pri. Sch. - Obayi; Elugwunta Village Square - Obayi; Ohonja Hall - Ohonja; Ovim Community School Ohoroho - Ohoroho; Ovim Community School - Ohoroho; Amuzu Village Square - Amuzu; Umudinja Village Square - Umudinja; Umukwu Village Square - Amune
Isuikwuato	Isiala Amawu	Orie Market Square - Umuasua; Amaba Daily Market - Amaba; Nkwo Market Square - Amaba; Isuikwuato High School - Otampa; Mgbelu Otampa Hall / Otampa; Orie Otampa Marlet Square / Umuasua; Amabo Market Square / Otampa; Ndiohia Village Square / Amaba; Akoba/Amaogudu Village Square / Otampa; Isiyi Village Square/Isiyi
Isuikwuato	Isu Amawu	Amautu Village Hall / Umuama; Okpoko Town Hall / Obodo; Eluama Secondary School / Ekebe; Eluama Central School / Amaobaja I; Ugwuokwo Village Hall, Ekereaja / Amamobaja II; Central School Umuobiala / Umuanama; Umuagbai Village Hall / Umuerem; Umuebere Village Hall Umuebere Nkuma; Amaedela Village Square / Umuobiala; Amaise Village Hall / Amaise; Obinohia Village Square / Obinohia I; Binohia Village Hall / Obinohia II; Umuokogbuo Town Hall / Umuokogbuo I; Umunteje Village Hall / Umuokogbuo II; Ulonna North Farm Settlement / Ulonna N North; Ulonna North Farm Settlement / Ulonna North II; Okayi Village Square / Okayi; Obiohia Amautu Village Square / Obiohia; Umuogwugwu Hall / Umuogwugwu
Isuikwuato	Ogunduasa	Acha Secondary School - Acha; Amorji Market Square - Acha; Nkporogwu Central School - Acha; Central School Nunya - Nunya; Oguduasa; Amaiyi Village Hall - Amaokwu; Amaokwu Village Hall - Amaokwu; Eke Uwama Market Square - Amaibo; Mgbelu - Ama Market Square - Amaibo; Ogbata / Ama Olekwere Square - Amiyi Obinohia; Umuigwe Village Hall - Amiyi Obinohia; Umueji Umahia Square - Amiyi Obinohia; Eziama Nunya Agbogoro Square - Nunya; Ogboro Amaokwu Hall - Amiyi
Isuikwuato	Umunnekwu	Amawo Village Square - Mgbelu Umunnekjwu; Ohaukabi Village Hall - Mgbelu Umunnekwu; Umuezebete Community Hall - Do - Do; Ugwunta Village Hall - Do - Do; Eziama Village Hall - Agbo Umunnekwu; Umura Village Hall - Do-; Umuihu Village Hall - Do -; Umuankwa Village Square - Do -; Amawo Village Square - Mgbelu Umunnekwu; Amankwo Village Square - Agbo Umunnekwu
Isuikwuato	Achara / Mgbugwu	Ogwahia Hall - Achara; Achara Central School - Achara; Ugwuogu Market Square - Mbaugwu; Ugwulele Community School - Mbaugwu; Ahuebele Village Square - Mbaugwu; Amaugwuru Village Square - Mbaugwu; Ngodo Market Square - Mbaugwu; Onuzo Market Square - Achara; Nnembi Hall - Mbaugwu; Amaidi Civil Centre - Achara; Amanyanwu Hall - Achara; Nkwoachara Market Square - Amaokwe Achara
Isuikwuato	Ikeagha I	Akpukpa Community School - Akpukpa; Onuaku VI Llage Square - Onuaku; Ndundu Community School - Ndundu; Ndundu Market Square - Ndundu; International Secondary School - Uturu; Amaukwu Village Square - Akpukpa; Umurata Village Square - Umurata; Amaehuma Village Square - Ndundu; Ikpaokoro Village Square - Ikpaokoro
Isuikwuato	Ikeagha II	Uturu Secondary School - Isunabo; Agbama Village Square - Isunabo; Agbongu Village Square - Isunabo; Inyima Village Square - Nvurunvu; Ukwunwangwu Village Square - Isunabo; Nuvurunvu Village Square - Nuvurunvu; Umumara Village Square - Nvurunvu; Nnezu / Owerre / Ihenkwo Village Square - Isunabo; Uzoeke Village Square - Agbongu Isunabo
Isuikwuato	Umuanyi / Absu	Abia State University - Uturu; Hope Ville Rehabilitation Centre - Uturu; Umuanyi Village Square - Umuanyi; Rotary Bus Stop - Uturu; Obiagu Village Square - Obiagu; Amakpu Village Square - Amakpu
Obingwa	Abayi I	Osusu Amaikwu - Osusu Amaukwu Village Square; Umuorukwu - Umuorukwu Square; Abayi Owuahia - Abayi Owuahia; Abayi Ohanze Village Square; Abayi Obeala Village Square; Umuocho - Umuocho Mkt. Square; Abayi Umuikea - Centra L School Abayi Umuikea; Abayi Comm- Pri. School; Abayi Ahiaorie Mkt. Square.; Umuokpulor Hall; Amaokpu Mkt. Square; Umuokiri Hall
Obingwa	Abayi II	Ukpakiri - Ukpakiri Village Hall; Alaoji - Alaoji Village Hall; Abayi Amaise Village Hall; Umuimegwu Mkt. Square; Abayi Okoroato - Okoroato Mkt. Square; Abayi Umueje - Umueje Mkt. Square; Amaorji Village Hall; Ehere I - Comm. Pri Sch. Ehere; Ehere II - All Saints Sec. School; Ehere Umuolele - Ehere Hall; Ehere Amaogugu Hall; Umuiheukwu Village Square; Umuchoko Comm. Hall; Umueriama Village Hall; Umuodukwu / Amunwego - Umuodukwu Village Hall; Umuokahia Village Hall; Umuafor Civic Hall; Umuakara Village Square; Umuokahia II - St. Partrick Model School; Umunwokoma Hall; Anwa/Amaolewe Village Square
Obingwa	Mgboko Umuanunu	Umuopara Village Square; Amuzu - Umuopara Comm Pri. School; Umuomai - Umuomai Comm. Pri. School; Umuebi - Umuebi Hall; Umuanunu - Mgboko Umuanunu Sec. Sch.; Isikor Village Hall; Ezebuogu Village Hall; Umunkiri Comm. School; Ekwereazu Ngwa Comm. School; Ntigha Umuaro Village Hall; Mgbokoanya - Mgbokoanya Hall; Umuokahia - Umukohai Comm. Pri. Sch.; Umuopara Egbelu - Umuopara Egbelu Mkt Square; Umuhuuaba - Umuhuaba Civic Hall; Umosiukwu / Umuosi - Nenu Civic Centre; Umugweze / Umuokpani - Nenu C. P. S Campus I; Umuanunu Ikea / Umunkita - Nenu C. P. S Campus II; Umuanunukwu / Onicha - Umuanunukwu Hall; Umugba - Umugba Civic Hall; Umuaro I -Umuaro Village Hall; Umuaro II - Umuaro Village Square; Umulugo - Umulogu Village Square; Umuaro - Umuaro Village Square
Obingwa	Mgboko Itungwa	Itungwa I - Itungwa C. P. S; Itungwa II - Itungwa C. P. S; Itukpa I - Itukpa Mkt Square; Itukpa II - Itukpa Vill. Hall; Umuosiukwu - Umuosiukwu Mkt. Sq; Itukala - Itungwa Cps; Umulelu - Umulelu Village Hall; Mgboko Umuoria - Maboko Umuoria C. P. S; Umuosi - Umuosi Village Hall; Mbutu Civic Hall; Ikala Umudagwa Hall; Ichi Civic Hall; Mgboko Osaa Ukwu Hall; Ohanze Umuirire Hall; Amumara I & II - Amummara Village Hall; Umuogele / Umuolugu - Umuogele Hall; Mbaraodu / Umunekere - Civic Hall; Akoli - Akoli Mkt. Square; Umukaka - Umukaka Village Square; Umuhu Alaoji Hall; Agburuike Isiugwu Hall; Umuamara - Umuamara Village Square; Achara Village Square; Umuozuo - Umuozuo Mkt. Square; Amaoji - Amaoji Civic Hall; Umuikea - Umuikea Vill. Hall; Akpuga - Akpuga Civic Centre; Amuzu Osaa Ukwu I & II Amuzu Hall; Umuokereke - Uhie Court Hall; Okuru Ohaka - Oruru Ohaka Village Hall; Umuada - Umuada Vill. Square
Obingwa	Ahiaba	Iheoji / Umuojima - Iheoji / Umuojima Vill. Sq; Obikabia/Umuarima - Umuarima Village Square; Umuonyegwa/Umuonyegwa Vill. Hall; Amangwu / Umueme - Amangwu / Umueme Hall; Umuohia - Umuohia Council Hall; Osusu Umuikpeghe - Osusu Umuikpeghe Hall; Umuelendu/Umuokea - Umuelendu Hall; Umunwankwo - Umunwankwo Village Hall; Umuobasiukwu - Umuobasiukwu Hall; Umuagu - Umuagu Hall; Ohuru I - Ohuru Village Hall; Umukalika - Umukalika Mkt. Square; Osaa / Okea - Osaa / Okea C. P. S; Umuariama - Umuariama Village Square; Abala Umuotu - Abala Umuotu Mkt.; Ohuru II - Ohuru C. P. S; Amaugba Ntigha Amaugba Village Square; Umuagwula - Umuagwula Village Square
Obingwa	Maboko Amairi	Umunwankwo - Uunwankwo Village Hall; Mgboko - Okpulor - Mgboko Okpulor Hall; Ofokobe - Ofokobe Vill. Square; Umuocha - Umuocha Village Hall; Umuarughi - Umuarghi Village Square; Obete I - Obete Village Hall; Umunkpi - Umunkpi Market Square; Umuezi - Umuezi Market Square; Eziama / Umuotu - Eziama C. P. S; Amaku / Umuobasi - Amaku Village Square; Umuikaba - Umuikaba Village Hall; Obete II - Obete Vill. Hall
Obingwa	Alaukwu Ohanze	Umuakatawom - Umuakatawom Hall; Umuobikwa - Umuobikwa Village Hall; Umuagwula Amapu - Village Hall; Eziama - Vill. Hall; Amuzu / Amaoji - Amuzu / Amaoji Hall; Ntigha Owo - Mkt Square; Mbara Akpuru - Village Square; Umuokorogu - Village Square; Umuko / Umuikima - Umuko / Umuikima Mkt.; Umuokenyi - Market Square; Umuafaokwu - Village Hall; Umuechi - Umuechi C. P. S; Umuezigbe - Council Hall Umuezigbo; Umuimea - Umuimea Village Hall; Umudim / Umuasada - Umudim Mkt. Sq; Umuagwu - Umuagwu Village Square; Umuahunanya - Village Hall; Agburuike - Agburuike Village Hall; Umuakoma - Village Hall; Umuibe - Village Hall; Umueke - Village Hall; Umuohunanya Ohanze - Mk T. Square; Umuoru - Umuoru Vill. Square; Ohanze Umuoji - Ohanze Umuoji Hall; Umuagada - Umuagada Council Hall; Ohanze - C. P. S Ohanze; Eluama - Eluama Village Square; Ogidiala Amaokwe - Ogidiala Village Square
Obingwa	Akumaimo	Akoli - Akoli Village Hall; Umuomai - Umuomai Hall; Agburuike I Agburike Hall; Ovom Amasa - Sec. Sch. Ovom; Ovom Girls Area - Ovom Girls Sec. School; Ovom - C. P. S Ovom; Mbaraikoro - Mbaraikoro Mkt. Square; Umuanunu - Umuanunu Village Square; Umuokenyi - Village Hall; Mbaraugba - Village Hall; Obikabia - Mkt. Square; Umuokoro - Umuokoro Village Hall; Agburuike II - Agburuike Village Square; Obuda - Obuda Hall; Akpaa - Afor Akpaa Mkt Square; Akoli II - C. P. S Akoli; Ntigha Mbaraegbu - Village Square
Obingwa	Ndiakata / Amairinabua	Umudosi - Mkt. Square; Umuiroma - Umuiroma Hall; Umuokereke - Mkt. Square; Umueze - Umueze Village Hall; Umuobasi - Umuobasi Village Hall; Ezidonaife - Mkt. Square; Umuokenyi - Umuokenyi Vill. Square; Opara - Opara Council Hall; Owoelu - Owoelu Council Hall; Ndiakatta - Village Hall Ndiatkatta; Umunwanna - Village Hall Umunwannna; Nlagu Vill Hall Nlagu; Umuodu - Village Hall Umuodu; Umuomai Village Hall Umuomai; Umulelu - Village Hall; Umuwaoma - Village Square; Umuokoro - Umuokoro Vill Hall; Umuagugo - Village Hall; Umuokpo - Umuokpo Village Hall; Ntigha Onicha - Ntigha Onicha Mkt. Square; Ekwereazu/Umuogbala Onicha C. P. S; Agburuike - Agbruike Village Hall; Onicha - Onicha Village Hall; Amude - Amude C. P. S; Umuohia / Nwasuka - Ovukwu Hall
Obingwa	Ntighauzo Amairi	Okenyi - Okenyi Village Hall; Obete Nchina - Obete Nchina Hall; Eziama - Eziama Village Hall; Amauvuru I - Amauvuru Village Square; Abam Nsulu - Abam Nsulu C. P. S; Umuali - Umuali Village Square; Amapu - Amapu Village Square; Umuaguma - C. P. S Umuaguma; Umuogele - C. P. S Ntighauzo; Iferife - Iferife Mkt Square; Okpuamukwa - Village Hall; Umuogele II Ntighauzo East C. P. S; Amauvuru II - Amauvuru Village Square; Ntigha Umuisiocha Hall; Umuchoko Akanu - Umuchoko Hall
Obingwa	Ibeme	Obihom - Obihom Village Hall; Nkpukpu Ulelu - Village Hall; Uhukwu - Uhukwu C. P. S; Umuokoro Ukpo - Village Hall; Abala Nkamiri - Village Square; Umuoria - Umuoria Village Square; Umunwnadiko - Umunwandiko Square; Obiawom - C. P. S. Obiawom; Obete Umuodu - Umuodu Mkt. Square; Ohaobu Obeteukwu - Ohaobu Hall; Umuche - Umuche Village Hall; Umuodota - Umuodota Hall; Ohanze Agwo - Mkt Square; Abiaka - Abiaka Village Hall; Nkpukpu Oka - Mkt Square; Mkpukpu Okpere - Mkpukpu Okpere Village Square; Umuezigbe - Umuezigbe Village Square; Umuamaechi / Umunwogu Vill Hall; Umuche - Umuche Village Square; Ohaobu - Ohaobu Village Square; Ohanze Agwo - Ohanze Agwo Vill. Square
Ohafia	Isiama Ohafia	Ohafia Cent. School; Future Hope Nursery School / Elu Prayer Hall; Ndi Imaga Compound - Ndi Imaga Hall I; Ndi Imaga Compound - Ndi Imaga Hall II; Elu Comm. School; Elu Motor Park; Ndi Ukaike Hall; Ndi Umuozio Hall; Afia Uda Mkt. I Square; Afia Uda Mkt. II Square; Afia Uda Mkt. Iiii Square; Ndi Ikuku / Odike Hall; Ndi Aja Compound Hall; Amaekpu Motor Park I; Ugwu Section Prayer Hall; Amaekpu Motor Park II; Ndi Uyo Hall; Ofali Agwu Primary School; Ahawa - Ahawa Square; Ohafia Girls Sec. School; Ndi Ofali Agwu Comp. Hall I; Ndi Ofali Agwu Comp. Hall Ll; Old Owuwa Anyanwu I Okagwe; Old Owuwa Anyanwu II Okagwe; Okagwe Comm Sch. I - Okagwe Comm. School; Okagwe Comm Sch. II - Okagwe Comm. School; Okagwe Town Square I; Okagwe Town Square II; Nkwebi Comm. Sch. I - Nkwebi Sch. Premises; Nkwebi Comm. Sch. II - Nkwebi Sch. Premises; Onukwu Comm. Sch. I - Sch. Premises; Onukwu Comm. Sch. II - Sch. Premises; Ndi Uduma Ukwu Hall; Ndia Nku Village Hall; Amaoba Amaekpu Hall; Amaekpu Comm. School; Sapele / Amuke Road - Co-Operative Society Office Hall; Ndi Eke-Ndi Eke Hall
Ohafia	Ebem Ohafia	Ndi Idika Mgbaga Comp. Hall; Kpoke Prim. School Hall; Ugomba Mgbaga Hall; Market Area - Ujurueze Hall; Ndi Ogwo Hall; Eziukwu Ikemba Hall; Unity Church Hall; Ndi Okwara Comp. Hall; Ibina Primary School Premises; Ugomba Ekeluogo - Ugomba Hall; Timber Shade; Customary Court; High Sch. Premises (Fed. Govt. College); Uzo-Ofuru - Okpu Nkuru Road Junction; Church Road - Catholic Church Premises; Ibina Pri. Sch. - Ibina Pri. Sch.
Ohafia	Ndi Elu Nkporo	Ndi Okoronta I - Okezie Hall; Ndi Okoronta II - Ndi Mgba Hall Amurie; Ndi Okoronta III - Mgba Hall Amurie; Amurie Pri. Sch. - Amurie Pri. Sch. Premises; Amankpo I - Amankpo Hall; Amankpo II - Amankpo Women Hall; Amankpo III - Akwunta Sq; Amiyi Amurie - Amiyi Hall Amurie; Ukofia - Ukofia/Amafor Hall; Amafor - Elebe Amafor Hall; Afia Bar - Ugwujimba Hall; Ogwoji - Ogwoji Nkata Hall; Amaudu - Elebe Ndinyom Square; Agbaezi I - Elebe Ndi Egwuonwu Hall; Agbaezi II - Egwuonwu / Okorima Hall; Amaelu - Elebe Amaelu Hall; Agba I - Etiti Ama Comm. School; Itim - Elebe Ndi Agwu Square; Amaeke - Elebe Amaeke Hall; Amautu - Elebe Ndi Orieukwu Square; Ochiagha Mkt. I - Market Square; Ogbani - Etiti Ama Comm. School I; Oji Omokwo - Ndi Oji Omokwo Square; Nduke / Afia Eke - Chinedu Hospital Hall
Ohafia	Ndi Etiti Nkporo	Ndi Asigha / Akaronu / Anya Amaukwu - Women Hall; Ndi Oji Amaukwu - Amaukwu Hall; Ndi Uke / Ndi Ebi / Ndi Igwe - Amaetiti Village Sq.; Ndi Okeawa / Ndi Ogwo / Akagha Amoba Village Sq; Ndi Anya / Ikpe / Ugbagha - Ndi Anya Ikpe Village Hall; Ndi Aje / Amorji / Agwu / Okoalayi - Amaufie Hall; Ndi Egwu / Omaghuzo I Elughu Pri Sch.; Ndi Okea/Anunu/Ejituru Okpo- Amangwu Hall; Ndi Egwu / Omaguzo - Elughu Pri. Sch.; Ndi Nsi/Ndem/Nma/Mba Ete - Ukwuakwu Village Hall; Ndi Ogwo / Uko Ndi Nko - Ndi Ogwo Sq. - Ndi Nko; Omaghuzo - Ndi Nko Health Centre Nkporo; Akarailu / Ukata - Ndi Nko - Akarilu Hall; Ndi Iyiuda / Akpa / Ibe / Obuofia - Iyiuda Village Hall; Ndi Anunu / Ndu - Okezie Amangwu Hall; Ndi Nkegha / Nma / Anya - Amaokwu Village Hall
Ohafia	Amaeke Abiriba	Amaja Compound - Amanta Hall; Amanta - Amant Vill. Hall; Agboezi Okpocha - Agboezi Okpocha Hall; Ndi Okoronte - Ndi Okoronte Hall; Ameke Abiriba; Omaghuzo Amaeke - Enuda Elementary Sch.; Agbo Court I - Enuda High School; Amebelu - Amebelu Hall; Ugwuezi - Egwuena Model Pri. Sch.; Oriri Layout - Oriri Layout; Eleama Comm. Sch. - Eleama Comm. Sch. Premises; Amuba Elu - Amuba Elu Hall; Amuba Agbo - Amuba Agbo Hall; Ihebu - Ihebu Hall; Okpan Ebiri / Agbai Uta - Okpan Ebiri / Agba Uta Premises; Afia Nkwo - Afia Nkwo Sq; Ndi Ezema I - Ndi Ezema Hall; Agbo Miri - Agbo Miri Hall; Ukpo - Ukpo Elu Hall; Binyom - Binyom Hall; Elu Amaja - Obuatu Hall; Amaebelu II - Amaebelu Hall
Ohafia	Amaogudu Abiriba	Ndi Okocha / Ubam - Ndi Okocha Village Square; Ndi Elefo Elu - Ndi Elefo Elu Hall; Ndi Echeche - Ndi Echeche Hall; Ndi Enwere, Amamba - Ndi Enwere Hall Amamba; Amamba Pri. Sch. I - Sch. Premises; Amamba Pri. Sch. II - Sch. Premises; Ndi Nwaba - Ndi Nwaba Hall; Ndi Mbaogu - Ndi Mbaogu Hall; Ndi Ewuruezi - Ndi Ewuruezi Hall; Elu Ogbu - Ogbu Comm. Sch.; Abiririba Cent. Sch. Cent Sch. Premises; Amaogudu St. Adium - Amaogudu Stadium; Amangwu Amaogupu - Amangwu Hall; Ozu Amamba - Ndi Ngele Hall; Agbo Ogbu - Agbo Ogbu Sq.
Ohafia	Agboji Abiriba	Kamalu - Okagwo Agboji Hall; Amabia - Ndi Icha Compound Sq; Ndi Okoroezi - Ndi Icha Compound Sq.; Amagbo - Ndi Agwu Compound; Agboji Pri. Sch. - Agboji Pri. Sch. Premises; Amaelu - Amaelu Hall; Amaobosi - Amaobosi Hall; Onu Agboji I - Agboji Pri. Sch.; Onu Agboji II - Agboji Pri. Sch.; Amaelu II - Amaelu Hall
Ohafia	Ohafor Ohafia	Atan Asaga - Atan Hall; Uma Ukpai Pri. Sch. I - Sch. Premises Asaga; Uma Ukpai Pri. Sch. II - Sch Premises Asaga; Ndi Mba / Nkwoma - Ndi Nkwoma Compound Asaga; Ndi Aji Compound - Ndi Aji Compound Square; Ndi Agwu Olobu Compound - Ndi Agwu Compound; Ndi Awam Ukwu - Ndi Awa Ukwu Hall; Ohafor Ohafia; Ndi Igbe Compound - Igbe Compound Hall; Ndi Ufere Compound - Ndi Ufere Compound Hall; Eziafor Comm. Sch - Omaghuzo Layout - Okogo Layout; Ndi Ukpai Compound - Ndi Ukpai Compound Hall; Amedo Comm. Sch. I - Amedo Comm Sch.; Amedo Comm. Sch. II - Amedo Comm Sch.; Amuke I - Ndi Odoara Comp. Hall; Ndi Ukpai Ndukwe Compound - Ndi Ndukwe Compound Hall; Ndi Ogbu I - Ndi Ogbu Comp. Hall; Ndi Onu Compound - Ukpa Ndukwe Compound Hall; Ogbokwe Pri. Sch. - Pri. Sch. Premises; Otodo Prim. Sch. - Prim. Sch. Premises; Amuke II - Amuke Town Hall; Ugwuiyi Ebi - Ugwuiyi Ebi Square Asaga; Ndi Mba Afia Afor II - Ndi Uma Odem Hall; Ndi Ogbu II - Ndi Ogbu Comp. Hall
Ohafia	Okamu Ohafia	Ndi Owan / Ume Comps - Anyafumba Hall; Ndi Idika Okoro Compound - Idika Okoro Hall; Okamu Sec. Comm. Sch - Okamu Sec. Sch; Omaghuzo Layout - Emehuna Hall; Okon Cent. Sec. - Okon Cent. Sec.; Alinji / Oba Ndi Uma / Isi Oku - Alinji Square; Ndi Uka / Emea / Ukpazu - Ndi Uka Village Square; Ndi Uke Village - Ndi Uke Village Square; Okamu Ohafia; Ndi Mbila Compound - Mbila Compound Hall; Ndi Ncheghe Village - Ncheghe Compound Hall; Ndi Ezichi Compound - Ezichi Compound Hall; Ndi Awa Amangwu Compound - Ndi Awa Hall; Ndi Torti - Ndi Torti Hall; Ambele Cent. Sch. II - Ambele Cent. Sch.; Ndiokpo / Eziukwu - Udi Okpo Hall; Ndi Uko / Ekea / Mbaulu Compounds - Ndi Uko Hall; Ndi Edem Compound - Edem Compound Hall; Utuga Utuga - Umuando Village Square; Amaoba - Amaoba Village Hall; Ndi Chima Compound - Ndi Chima Hall; Ndi Eche Compound - Eche Compound Hall; Ndi Ebin Compound - Ndi Ebin Hall
Ohafia	Ania Ohoafia	Comm. Pri. Sch. Abia - Abia Comm. Pri. Sch.; Ndi Onu Compound - Ndi Onu Compound Hall; Ndi Ebem Ogo - Ebem Ogo Compound Hall; Ndi Oji Compound - Oji Compound Hall; Isiugwu Comm. Sch. I - Isiugwu Comm. Sch. Premises; Isiugwu Comm. Sch. II - Isiugwu Comm. Sch. Premises; Udara Afia Ogo - Ndi Odo Okamu Square; Ukpache Pri. Sch. / Ndi Emea - Ukpache Pri. Sch. Premises; Ndi Ulu Agboke - Ndi Ulu Agboke Hall; Ania Ohafia; Ndi Ibe Compound - Ndi Ibe Hall Akamu; Ndi Oke Compound - Ndi Oke Hall Akamu; Ndi Akamandu Compound - Ndi Akamandu Hall; Ndi Agbo Compound - Ndi Agbo Hall; Ndi Emerua Compound - Ndi Emerua Hall; Ndi Mbilechi - Ndi Mbilech Hall; Ndi Echi Compound - Ndi Echi Hall; Amankwu Comm. Sch. - Amankwu Comm. Sch. Premises; Ndi Ezema Compound - Ndi Ezema Hall; Paradise Square - Paradise Square; Ndi Emele - Ndi Emele Hall; Ndi Uge - Ndi Uge Hall; Ndi Anya Compound - Ndi Anya Hall
Ohafia	Ndi Agbo Nkporo	Ndi Oji / Ibe / Onyeugu /Uka Nduka - Ndi Agbai Village Square; Ndi Ngele / Okpaka - Obuma Village Hall Ukwa; Ndi Uka Nsi / Ndi Anya - Women Hall Ukwa; Isioba / Ndi Owu / Akarandu I - Comm. Pri. Sch. Ukwa; Ndi Okpe / Udeji / Dochu / Akpu - Agbaja Village Square; Ndi Akaraogu II / Ndi Oku / Arunsi - - Star Hall Premises; Ndi Ibe / Oku / Ude - Agbaja Village Hall; Ndi Ikpo / Ndi Nsi / Ndi Akpa - Agbaja Village Hall; Ndi Ajali / Ndi Arunsi - Agbaja Village Hall; Obichie New Layout - Obichie Square; Ndi Eche / Ndi Abiayi - Elebe Ndinyum Hall Premises; Ndi Ikpo / Ndi Uba - Enyimba Hall Premises; Omaguzo / Uko / Ibe - Okwoko Comm. Hall; Isiofia / Oko - Oko / New Layout Okoko Pri. Sch.; Obieze Okoko / Orughumini - Obiezeor - Ughumini Square; Ndi Ekpuagha / Onyeugwo / Oduko - Men's Hall Ukwa; Obichie New Layout II - Obichie Quarters
Osisioma	Amavo	Umuokorocha Square; Umuekpe Village Square; Osiloji Village Square; Umuyoronta Village Square; Umudaba Village Square; Umuokirika Village Sq.; Umunwankoala Village Sq.; Umuagbahigba Village Square
Osisioma	Amaitolu Mbutu Umuojima	Asamato Pri. School; Isiahia Village Square; Umuojima Ogbu Village Square; Umuojima Ogbu Primary School; Umuojima Okereke Village Square; Umuocheala Village Square; Umugaa Village Square; Umuozuo Pri. School; Abayi Ariaria Pri. School; Abayi Ogbuligba Village Sq I; Umuikpo Village Square; Umuechem Village Square; Ukwu Mango Square; Ogwugwu Crossing; Ihuigwe Square; Asamoka Village Square; Oberete Council Hall; Umuidia Village Square - Umuidia I; Umuojima Ogbu Village Square - Umuojima Ogbu; Umuojima Ogbu Pri. School Umuojima Ogbu; Abaiyi Ogbuligba Village Square II
Osisioma	Amasator	Umungasi Hall - Umungasi I; Umungasi Post Office - Umungasi II; Boundary Avenue - Umungasi III; Umule Hall - Umule I; St. Michael's Sec. Sch. - Umule II; 67 Infantry - Umule III; Umuode Civic Centre - Umuode I; Umuode Voca. Sch. - Umuode II; Girls' Sec Sch Abayi I; Abayi Village Hall- Abayi II; Ngwa High Sch. - Abayi III; Umunwankwo Hall - Abayi V; Ayiaba Pri. Sch Umunze.; Umuochichi Comm. Sch. - Umuochichi; Umuocham Council Hall - Umuocham I; Ngwa High Sch, Abayi II; Abayi Village Hall - Abayi II; Umuocham Girls' Sec. Sch. - Umuocham II; Umuocham Girls' Sec. Sch. - Umuocham III
Osisioma	Aro - Ngwa	Okpuala - Aro Village Hall; Umuarakkpa Hall; Umuejea Village Hall; Umuohia Village Hall; Umuonyeukwu Village Hall; Obiekwesu Village Hall; Umuekwe Village Hall; Umuotuo Village Hall
Osisioma	Ama - Asaa	Amauzu Village Hall; Mbutu Nta Village Hall; Ekeobasi Village Hall; Ibeku Village Hall; Umuihuoma Village Hall; Amaogwugwu Village Hall; Amator Village Hall- Umuimo; Amator Village Hall- Amafor.
Osisioma	Oso - Okwa	Okpuala Ukwu Comm. School - Okpuala Ukwu I; Ekeobasi Village Square; Umuobilohia Village Square; Umuohia Village Square; Umuenyiukwu Pri. School; Amankwu Hall; Akpa Market Square; Okpuala Ukwu Hall - Okpuala Ukwu II
Osisioma	Urtta	Okpokoroala Council Hall; Sda Pri. Sch. - Sda Environ I; Sda Pri. Sch. - Sda Eviron II; Umueke Council Hall; Umuaduru Council Hall; Ibibi Uratta Council Hall; Egbede Council Hall - Egbede; Umuochor Civic Hall - Umuochor; Obuzor Village Hall - Obuzor; Amapu Igbengwor Civic Hall - Amapu; Umuekaa Council Hall
Osisioma	Amator	Amapuipe Comm. School; Eke Na Afor Square; Umuokoro Ukwu Square; Umuoyoro Square; Umuagbai Comm. School; Amaogwugwu Village Square; Umuokiri Village Square; Umuodu Village Square; Umuokoro Civic Hall; Umuigbe Village Square; Umudike Village Hall; Umuokiri / Umuodu Primary School
Osisioma	Umunneise	Okpuala Umu Gwor Hall / Okpuala Umu Gwor I; Umumba Umuru Comm. School; Amapu Umuavor Village Hall; Amuzu Village Hall; Okpuala Umugwor Square - Okpuala Umugwor II
Osisioma	Okpor - Umuobo	Mgboko Umuete Hall; Umuaba Village Hall I; Umuaba Village Hall II; Amaekpu Village Hall.; Umuobo Village Hall; Uratta Village Hall; Amuzu Village Hall; Umuagwa Village Hall
Ugwunagbo	Ward One	Obegu I - Obegu Village Hall; Obegu II - Obegu Market Square; Obegu III - Umunwaji Market Osieke; Obegu IV - Arugwu Primary School; Obegu V - Obegu Village Hall; Umuosueke I Umuosueke Sec. School; Umuosueke II Umuosueke Civic Hall
Ugwunagbo	Ward Two	Obeaja 1 - Obeaja Village Hall; Obeaja II - Obeaja Primary School; Obeaja III - Obeaja Primary School; Osusuaku I -Osusuaku Civic Centre; Osusuaku 11 - Osusuaku Primary School; Osusuaku 111 - Ugwunagbo Customary Court; Umuodo 1 - Umuodo Civic Hall; Umuodo 11- Umuodo Primary School
Ugwunagbo	Ward Three	Abayinchokoro 1- Abayinchoroko Civic Centre; Abayinchokoro 11- Abayinchoroko Pri. School; Abayinchokoro 111- Abayinchoroko Pri. School; Amapu Ideobia 1- Amapu Ideobia Pri. School; Amapu Ideobia 11- Amapu Ideobia Pri. School; Amapu Ideobia 111-Amapu Ideobia Pri. School; Umuawula- Umuawula Civic Hall; Umuaja 1- Umuaja I Civic Hall; Umuaja 11- Umuaja Primary School; Umuamaoke 1- Umuamaoke Pri. School; Umuamaoke 11- Umuomenihu Civil Hall; Umulegu - Umulegu Civic Centre
Ugwunagbo	Ward Four	Owerre Aba 1 - Owerre Aba Pri. School; Owerre Aba 11- Owerre Aba Village Hall; Owerre Aba 111- Owerre Aba Village Hall; Owerre Aba IV- Owerre Aba Village Hall; Nkpukpu Ebula 1-Nkpukpu Ebula Village Hall; Nkpukpu Ebula 11- Epelle Progressive Hall; Nkpukpu Ebula 111-Nkpunkpu Ebula Vil. Hall; Nkpukpu Ebula IV-Epelle Progressive Hall; Umuele Osoamadi 1-Umuele Osoamadi Vil. Hall; Umuele Osoamadi 11-Umuele Osoamadi Mak. Sq.; Umuele Osoamadi 111-Umuele Osoamadi Vil. Hall; Umuele Osoamadi IV-Umuele Osoamadi Vil. Hall; Osusu Umuelendu 1-Osusu Umuelendu Vil. Hall; Osusu Umuelendu 11-Osusu Umuelendu Vil. Hall; Umunkama 1-Umunkama Primary School; Umunkama 11-Umunkama Village Hall; Nkpukpu Ebula V Nneka Pr. Sch. Agulana St.
Ugwunagbo	Ward Five	Akanu Ngwa 1- Akanu Ngwa Primary School; Akanu Ngwa 11- Akanu Ngwa Civic Centre; Akanu Ngwa 111-Amuzu Akanu Markt. Square; Akanu Ngwa IV-Umuajaonyi Council Hall; Akanu Ngwa V- Umueso Council Hall; Akanu Ngwa VI- Umuchima Square; Akanu Ngwa V11-Umuada Civic Centre; Akanu Ngwa V111- Umuajaonyi Council; Akanu Ngwa IX- Akanu Ngwa High School; Amaokpu Umuitiri 1-Amaokpu Umuitiri Hall; Amaokpu Umuitiri 11- Amaokpu Civic Hall; Ukebe-Ukebe Council Hall
Ugwunagbo	Ward Six	Asa Umuakwa 1- Asa Umuakwa Pri. School; Asa Umuakawa 11- Asa Umuakwa Village Hall; Asa Umuakwa 111-Asa Umuakwa Market Square; Umuarukwu- Umuarukwu Civic Centre; Umuchukwu 1- Umuchukwu Civic Centre; Umuchukwu 11- Umuchukwu Market Square; Amuzu Amaikoro 1 - Amuzu Amaikoro Civic Hall; Amuzu Amaikoro 11-Amuzu Amaikoro Mkt. Sq; Amapu Umuodo 1-Amapu Umuodo Civic Hall; Amapu Umuodo 11- Amapu Umuodo Civic Hall
Ugwunagbo	Ward Seven	Asa Umunka I - Asa Umanka Primary School; Asa Umunka II - Asa Umanka Civic Hall; Asa Nnetu I - Asa Nnetu Civic Hall; Asa Nnetu II - Asa Nnetu Motor Parts Market; Asa Nnetu III - Asa Nnetu Motor Parts Market; Asa Nnetu IV - Asa Nnetu Mechanic Village; Asa Nnetu V - Asa Nnetu Motor Parts Market; Asa Nnetu VI - Asa Nnetu Mechanic Village; Asa Nnetu VII - Asa Nnetu Motor Parts Market; Asa Nnetu VIII - Asa Nnetu Motor Parts Market; Asa Nnetu IX - Asa Nnetu Civic Hall; Asa Amauhi I - Asa Amauhi Civic Hall; Asa Amauhi II - Asa Amauhi Civic Hall; Asa Oborie I - Asa Oborie Village Hall; Asa Oborie II - Asa Oborie Village Hall
Ugwunagbo	Ward Eight	Umugo I - Umugo Primary School; Umugo II - Umugo Civic Hall; Umugo III - Umugo Market Square; Umugo IV - Umuobasi Council Hall; Oza Umuebukwu I - Oza Umuebukwu Community School; Oza Umuebukwu II - Oza Umuebukwu Civic Hall; Oza Umuebukwu III - Oza Umuebukwu Market Square; Amavor I - Amavor Civic Centre; Amavor I - Amavor Market Square; Alaoji - Alaoji Village Hall
Ugwunagbo	Ward Nine	Ihieukwu I - Ihieukwu Primary School; Ihieukwu II - Ihieukwu Primary School; Ihieukwu III - Nvosi Village Hall; Ihieukwu IV - Ihieukwu Primary School; Ihieobeaku I - Ihieobeaku Primary School; Ihieobeaku II - Ihieobeaku Market Square; Ihiembaso I - Ihiebaso Civic Hall; Isinkpa - Isinkpa Civic Hall; Amorji Ihie - Amorji Ihie Market Square; Amuzu Ihie I - Amuzu Ihie Civic Hall; Amuzu Ihie II - Umuagara Village Hall; Amapu Umuba I - Amapu Umuba Village Hall; Amapu Umuba II - Amapu Umuba Market Square
Ugwunagbo	Ward Ten	Ngwaiyiekwe I - Ngwaiyiekwe Primary School; Ngwaiyiekwe II - Ngwaiyiekwe Civic Hall; Ngwaiyiekwe III - Ngwaiyiekwe Market Square; Ngwaiyiekwe IV - Ngwaiyiekwe Bus Stop; Obuzorngwa I - Obuzorngwa Village Hall; Obuzorngwa II - Obuzorngwa Market Square; Amaorji Amano I - Amaorji Amano Primary School; Amaorji Amano II - Amaorji Amano Civic Hall; Amaorji Amano III - Amaorji Amano Market Square
Ukwa East	Ikwuriator East	Akanu Village Hall - Umugbueze/Akanu; Umuadebele Village Square - Umuadebele; Nkpukpule Village Square - Nkpukpule; Community Primary School - Nkpukpuaja I; Community Primary School - Nkpukpuaja II
Ukwa East	Ikwuriator West	Community Primary School Abaki - Abaki; Obuzo Village Hall - Obuzo; Mkpukpuoha Village Hall - Mkpukpuoha; Umuogor Village Hall - Umuogor
Ukwa East	Azumini	Ohuku - Ohuku Village Hall; Ijaw Village Hall - Ijaw I; Uhuakata Village Hall - Uhuakata; Okoroma Village Hall - Okoroma; Nps Azumini - Nps; Obiohuru Village Square - Obiohuru; Ijaw Village Hall - Ijaw II
Ukwa East	Umuigube Achara	Cps Akirika Uku - Akiriki Uku I; Ijaw Town Hall - Akirika Uku II; Amaoba Village Square - Akirika Uku III; Akirika Nta Village Hall - Akirika Nta; Cps Akirika Obu - Akirika Obu
Ukwa East	Akwete	Cps Akwete - Akwete I; Cps Akwete - Akwete II; Uhuobu Village Hall - Uhuobu; Umuibe Village Square - Umibe; Ohandu Village Hall - Ohandu; Rubber Research - Rubber Research; Umuabo Village Square - Umuabo; Akwete Town Hall - Okpuhu
Ukwa East	Obohia	Obohia Town Hall - Obohia I; Umunwankwonta Hall - Obohia II; Umuokoroja Village Hall - Umuokoroja; Umuekeoma Village Hall - Umuekeoma; Town School Obohia - Town School
Ukwa East	Ikwueke East	Ohambele Village Square - Ohambele I; Ohambele Village Square - Ohambele II; Eti Village Hall - Eti; Ohaobu Village Square - Ohabu I; Ohaobu Village Square - Ohabu II; Obeaku Village Hall - Obeaku I; Icss - Abia Palm I; Icss - Abia Palm II; Mkpuajekere Hall - Mkpuajekere; Amorji Village Hall - Amorji
Ukwa East	Ikwueke West	Ohanso Village Hall - Ohanso I; Ohanso Kindred Hall - Ohanso II; Obunku C. P. S - Obunku I; Obunku C. P. S - Obunku II; Mkpuohia Oba Village Hall - Mkpuohia . Oba I; Mkpuohia Oba Village Hall - Mkpuohia . Oba II
Ukwa East	Nkporobe/Ohuru	Central School Ohuru - Ohuru I; Ukebe Village Hall - Ohuru II; Osugwu Village Hall - Ohuru III; Obozu Village Hall - Obozu; Obegu Cps - Obegu I; Umuopara Village Hall - Obegu II; Ukebe Village Hall - Ohuru IV
Ukwa East	Ikwuorie	Ohanku Village Hall - Ohanku I; Ohanku Umudeoro Hall - Ohanku II; Ohanku Village Hall - Ohanku III; Okotoko Village Hall - Okotoko I; Okotoko Village Hall - Okotoko II; Amakam Village Hall - Amakam I; Umuachu Village Hall - Amakam I; Ogburga Village Square - Ogburga
Ukwa West	Asa North	Umuiku - Ukor Village Hall - Umuiku - Ukor; Omuna Uzor Village Square / Omuna Uzor; Umuekechi High School / Umuekechi I; Umuekechi Village Hall / Umuekechi II; Obingwu Village Hall / Obingwu I; Mbano Central School Umuekechi/Umuekechi - Obingwu; Umuezeke Village Hall / Umuezeke
Ukwa West	Obokwe	Central School Obokwe / Obokwe I; Central School Obokwe / Obokwe II; Obokwe Secondary School / Obokwe III; Obokwe Secondary School / Oboke IV; Obokwe Secondary School / Obokwe V
Ukwa West	Ogwe	Obiahia Village Hall/Obiaha I; Obiahia Primary School / Obiahia II; Ogwe Health Centre/Ogwe I; Ogwe Central School/Ogwe II; Ogwe Central School/Ogwe III; Ogwe Town School/Ogwe IV; Ogwe Town School/Ogwe V; Obiawom Village Hall/Obiawom; Umuazuta Village Hall/Umuazuta; Umuaburu Village Hall; Ogwe - Orgwu Village Hall
Ukwa West	Asa South	Community Primary School / Umuaka I; Umuaka Village Square / Umuaka II; Ozatta Village Square/Ozatta I; Ozatta Community Primary School / Ozatta II; Ugwuati Community Primary School I; Ugwuati Community Primary School II; Ugwuati Community Primary School III
Ukwa West	Obuzor	Umuelechi Village Hall / Umuelechi; Obiakpu Village Square / Obiakpu; Umuajoha Village Hall / Umuajoha; Obuzor Community Primary School / Obuzor; Umuokwulu Village Hall/Umuokwulu Ezebudele; Umuwaga Village Hall/Oyega Umuwaga; Umuahala Village/Umuahala; Umunkwocha Village Hall/Umunkocha Ezebudele II; Obibor C. P. S./Obibor
Ukwa West	Ipu West	Umuokwulu Village Square / Umuokwulu; Owaza Secondary School / Owaza I; Central School Owaza / Owaza II; Etiti Uzor Village Square / Etiti - Uzor; Umuokudu Village Square / Umuokudu
Ukwa West	Ipu East	Obechie Central School / Obechie I; Obechie Village Hall / Obechie II; Umudiobia I / Umudiobia C. P. S; Umudiobia Market Square / Umudiobia II; Obehie Central School / Obehie II; Obehie Central School / Obehie IV
Ukwa West	Ipu South	Uzuaku Primary School / Uzuaku I; Uzuaku Village Hall / Uzuaku II; C. P. S Okohia / Okohia; Central School Imo River / Imo River I; Town School Imo River / Imo River II; Amanapia Village Square/Anapia
Ukwa West	Ozaa Ukwu	Umunteke C. P. S/Umunteke I; Umunteke Village Hall / Umunteke II; Umunteke Village Square/Umunteke III; C. P. S Umuiku/Umuiku I; Amaukwu Ezi Village Hall/Umuadienwe; C. P. S Owo Asa/Owo - Asa I; C. P. S Owo Asa/Owo - Asa II; Owo - Ala Council Hall/Owo - Ala; Oborhia Village Hall/Oborhia I; Umuebulungwu Village Hall; C. P. S Umuiku/Umuiku II; Umuebulungwu /Umuebulungwu II
Ukwa West	Ozaa West	Obahu Community Hall / Obahu; N. P. S Umukalu/Umukalu I; Ikpokwu Village Hall/Ikpokwu I; Umuorie C. P. S / Umuorie I; Umuorie C. P. S / Umuorie III; Umuokwor Village Hall / Umuokwor; Umuitiri Primary School / Umitiri; Obiga Market Square / Obiga; N. P. S Umukalu / Umukalu II; Ikpokwu Village Hall/Ikpokwu II
Umuahia North	Ibeku East I	Nkata I - Nkata Primary School; Nkata II - Nkata Primary School; Nkata III - Nkata Primary School; Okwuta I - Okwuta Central School; Okwuta II - Okwuta Village Square; Isieke Umuajiji I - Isikeke Central School; Isieke Umuajiji II - Isikeke Central School; Isieke Umuajiji III - Isikeke Secondary School; Okwoyi - Okwoyi Central School; Ukome - Ukome Central School; Mbom - Mbom Central School; Umuchoko/Umuagbo - Community School Ameke; Isiadu - Isiadu Community School; Ndagbo Ameke - Ndagbo Ameke Village Square; Umueziagwu - Umueziagwu Village Square; Ogubi Umuefere - Ogubi Village Square; Isieke Umuajiji III - Isikeke Central School
Umuahia North	Ibeku East II	Ubani - Ubani Central School; Ata - Ata Central School; Eziama/Mgbaja I - Eziama/Mgbaja Central School; Ussi Ossah - Orie Orji Village School; Uhabiri/Umuchi - Orie Orji Village School; Umueze - Umueze Village Square; Agbo - Agbo Village Square; Umuagu - Umuagu Primary School; Emede - Emede Primary School; Udide - Idide Village Square; Eziama/Mgbaja II - Central School Eziama Mgbaja; Emede Umuakanni - Umuakanni Village Square
Umuahia North	Ndume	Ohokobe - Ohokobe Primary School; Umuohu - Umuohu Primary School; Umuana I - Ibeama Primary School; Umuana II - Ibeama Primary School; Umuana III - Mgboko Village Square; Umuana- Amaudara Village Sq.; Umuana V - Obuorji Village Square; Lodu I - Lodu Village Square; Lodu II - Lodu Village Square; Ihie Ndume - Ihie Village Square; Ahiaeke Ndume Ahiaeke Pri Sch.; Umuhute I - Umuhute Village Square; Umuhute II - Umuhute Village Square; Ahiaeke Ofeke - Ofeke Market Square; Azueke Ahiaeke - Azueke Village Square; Government College - Government College; Umuafai - Umuafai Village Square; Ibeku High School - Ibeku High School I; Ibeku High School - Ibeku High School II; Umuezeala - Umuezeala Village Square; Ohokobe Umuohu I - Ohokobe Village Square; Ohokobe Umuohu II - Ohokobe Village Square
Umuahia North	Ibeku West	Ajata Okwuru I - Ajata Okwuru Village Square; Ajata Okwuru II - Ajata Okwuru Primary School; Iyienyi I - Iyienyi Village Square; Iyienyi II - Iyienyi Village Square; Avonkwu I - Avonkwu Village Square; Avonkwu II - Avonkwu Village Square; Avonkwu III - Ndagbo Village Square; Amuzuoro - Amuzuoro Village Square
Umuahia North	Umuahia Urban I	Ugba I - Community School Ugba; Ugba II - Community School Ugba; Ugba III - Community School Ugba; Ugba IV - Orie Ugba Village Square; Mission Hill I - Mission Hill Primary School; Mission Hill II - Mission Hill Primary School; Library/Opara/Factory - Library Premises; Queen Elizabeth I - Queen Elizabeth Hospital; Queen Elizabeth II - Umuobasi Hall; Queen Elizabeth III - Queen Elizabeth Hospital; Afara Technical Secondary School - Secondary Technical Afara; Ohokobe/Umuokeyi Secondary School - Secondary Technical Afara; Ohokobe Afara/Umuokeyi - Umuokeyi Village Square; Umuokeyi Okwulaga - Secondary Technical Afara; Azikiwe/Macaulay - Urban I Primary School; Urban I Primary School I - Urban I Primary School; Urban I Primary School II - Urban I Primary School; Mgboko/Umuobasi - Mgboko Umuobasi Village Square; Mgboko - Mgboko Village Square; Ndagbo/Etitinabo - Ndagbo Etitinabo Village Square; Isiama Afara Ukwu - Union Primary School Afara; School For The Blind - School For The Blind; Etitilabu I - Union Primary School Afara; Special School For The Blind - Ibeku Central School; Low Cost Housing Estate - Low Cost Housing Estate; World Bank Estate I - World Bank Primary School; World Bank Estate II - World Bank Primary School; Police/Domestics Science - Domestics Science Centre; Umuwaya Road I - Umuwaya Road Primary School; Umuwaya Road II - Umuwaya Road Primary School; Umuwaya Road III - Umuwaya Road Primary School; School Road Model Primary School - Ministry Of Education Premises; Aba Road/Odidanyanwu - Post Office Premises; St. Finbars Road - Abia Hotels; Police Barracks - Central Police/Domestic; Odidianyanwu - L. G. A Secretariat; Umuobasi Ugba - Umuobasi Ugba Village Square
Umuahia North	Umuahia Urban II	Item Street - Umuwaya Primary School; Warri Street - Umuwaya Primary School; Domestic Centre I - Domestic Centre; Domestic Centre II - Domestic Centre; Urban/Abiriba/Eket St. - St. Stephens Primary School; Lagos/Arochukwu St. - St. Stephens Primary School; Bonny/Cameroun St. - St. Stephens Primary School; Orlu/Kaduna St. - St. Stephens Primary School; Amuzukwu/Garki/Nkwerre - Amuzukwu Secondary School; Amuzukwu/Garki/Olokoro - Amuzukwu Secondary School; Amuzukwu/Garki/Igbere - Amuzukwu Secondary School; Amuzukwu/Garki/Awolowo - Amuzukwu Secondary School I; Amuzukwu/Garki/Awolowo - Amuzukwu Secondary School II; Industrial Layout I - Amuzukwu Secondary School; Industrial Layout II- Amuzukwu Secondary School; Amuzukwu - Umuwaya Mbara Village Square
Umuahia North	Umuahia Urban III	Ossah/Palm/Oguta/Jos - Urban II Primary School I; Uyo/Ahoada/Kano/Ogoja/Awka - Primary School II; Imo/Igbo/Rivers Lane - Urban II Primary School; Degema/Accra/Eket/Kaduna/Orlu - Urban II Primary School; Nkporo/Umuopkara - Ugwunchara Primary School; Oboro/Ekwuruke/Obowo - Ugwunchara Primary School; Ozuitem/Awolowo/Uwalaka - Ugwunchara Primary School; Ugwunchara/Oboro/Asaba/ Oji River Street.; Awkuzu/Awolowo - Ugwunchara Primary School; Udi/ Oji River Jnr. Girls' Sec School.; Uwalaka/Uzuakoli Road - Junior Girls Secondary School; Junior Secondary School Ngwa/Asaba - Junior Girls Secondary School; Junior Secondary School/Museum - Junior Girls Secondary School; Girls Secondary School/ Museum - Girls Secondary School; Girls Secondary School/Mission Road - Girls Secondary School
Umuahia North	Nkwoachara	Umuawa Alaocha I - Umuawa Alaocha Primary School; Umuawa Alaocha II - Umuawa Alaocha Primary School; Umuawa Alaocha III - Umuezoroala Village Square; Umuawa Alaocha IV - Umuezoroala Village Square; Umuawa Alaocha V - Agbala Village Hall; Umuawa Alaocha VI - Umuawa Alaocha Market Square; Umuire - Umuire Village Square; Umuana/Umuokara/Umuyota - Orie Amaenyi Primary School; Umunkaro - Orie Amaenyi Central School
Umuahia North	Nkwoegwu	Umuosu Okaiuga - Central School Nkwoegwu; Umunemeze Okaiuga/Umukam - School Nkwoegwu; Umuohuru Okaiuga I Central - School Nkwoegwu; Egwu Na Eleke - Umuohuru Primary School; Umukabia I - Umukabia Central School; Akpahia Okupuala I - Okwoba Community School; Akpahia Okupuala II - Okwoba Community School; Nkata Alike I - Nkwoegwu Central School; Umukabia II - Umukabia Village Square; Umuohuru Okaiuga - Umuosu Okaiuga Square; Umukabia Okpuala - Umukabia Market Square
Umuahia North	Afugiri	Ulonna South - Farm Settlement Primary School; Umuosu Umuegwu - Williams Memorial Secondary School; Umuagungolori - Williams Memorial Secondary School; Umuakam - Umuakam Village Square; Umunemeze I - Umunemeze Village Square; Umunemeze II - Umunemeze Village Square; Akpahia Obiohuru I - Akpahia Village Square; Akpahia Obiohuru II - Akpahia Village Square; Umuokehi Obiohuru - Umuokehi Obiohuru Village Square; Umuegwu Okpuala - Umuegwu Okpuala Village Square; Umuekwule I - Afugiri Central School; Umuokehi Okpuala - Umuokehi Okpuala Village Square; Umule I - Ekeokwuru Central School; Umule II - Ekeokwuru Central School; Umule III - Umule Umuosagba Na Okpuala Hall; Umuokorala - Umuokoroala Village Square; Umuekwule II - Umunkiraoch (Umuchukwu) Village Square
Umuahia North	Umuhu	Amaogwugwu I - Ohuhu Community Secondary School; Amaogwugwu II - Ohuhu Community Secondary School; Umuagu - Umuagu Central School; Umudiawa- Umudiawa Pri. Sch.; Umungasi I - Umungasi Town Hall; Umuogba I - Umurum Town Hall; Umuogba II - Umurum Town Hall; Uhuokwu I - Uhuokwu Town Hall; Ubaha - Ubaha Alala Town Hall; Umuala/Umuezeoma - Nkwo Umuhu Hall; Ihite Ude Ofeme - Ihite Ude Village Square; Umueziama- Umueziama Pri. Sch.; Udeoalaocha - Eke Ude Market Square; Umuezike - Afor Umuezike Market Square; Ude Na Eze - Umuda Primary School; Isingwu Ofeme - Ekeisingwu Primary School; Mbato Ofeme - Mbato North Primary School; Ulonna North - Ulonna North Primary School; Umudiawa II - Umudiawa Ofe Miri
Umuahia North	Isingwu	Isingwu I - Amafor Ukwu Civic Centre; Isingwu II - Umuoriehi Civic Centre; Isingwu III - Umuoriehi Civic Centre; Amato - Maternity Hall; Amafor Isingwu I - Amafor Ihu - Ngwu; Amafor Isingwu II - Library Premises; Umuda Isingwu I - Umuda Isingwu Primary School; Umuda Isingwu II - Umuda Isingwu Primary School; Umuda Isingwu III - Umuda Isingwu Primary School; Isingwu Okpuala I - Isingwu Okpuala Hall; Amafor Isingwu III Community Secondary School Isingwu
Umuahia South	Ezeleke/Ogbodiukwu	Amachara/Amankwo - Amachara Hall; Amachara - Okpurudara Square; Umuekwule - Umuekwule Civic Hall; Umuabali I - Ezeleke Primary School; Umuabali II - Umuabali Civic Hall; Umuajameze/Ogbodiukwu - Ajameze Hall; Umudika/Umuorinoku - Ofeiyi Square; Umuchime - Ogbodiukwu Primary School; Umuanya/Esi - Umuanya Civic Hall; Umuba - Umuba Hall; Dimario/Oparocha - Ogbodiukwu Primary School; Umudinka/Umuorinoku - Ofeiyi Square
Umuahia South	Omaegwu	Ekenobizi/Dikeukwu - Dikekwu Hall; Dikenta/Azumiri - Azumiri Hall; Umuzam/Umuneobukwu - Umuzam Civic Centre; Umuihe/Ehume - Umuihe Hall; Chokoloma - Chokoloma Hall; Umanara - Umunara Hall; Umuonyime/Umoleke - Ehume Central School; Ohiya/Umuonya - Ohiya Primary School; Umueze - Ohiya Civic Centre; Egbeada - Ohiya Civic Centre; Ohiya/Okwu/Ngodo - Ohiya Civic Centre; Ohiya/Okwu/Oram - Ohiya Civic Centre; Ngodo - Ngodo Village Square; Ohiya / Okwu /Oram - Ohiya Civic Centre
Umuahia South	Ohiaocha	Umunwanwa/Ngodo - Umunwanwa Central School; Mgbedeala/Umuobia - Umunwanwa Central School; Umugwu - Umugwu Village Square; Eluama/Umuawoli - Eluama Village Square; Umuejenye/Umumgborie - Umuejenye Village Square; Umuoke - Umuoke Village Square; Umuezi - Nkwo Ozu Village Square; Umuekwea - Umuekwea Village Hall; Umuogidi - Umuogidi Village Hall; Ogbodiochie - Ogbodiochie Primary School; Ibe - Ibe - Town Hall; Ogbodiohuru - Ogbodiohuru Town Hall
Umuahia South	Ahiaukwu I	Agbama/Umuegereze Umuegereze Hall; Umuagwu - Umuagwu Hall; Avonkwu - Avonkwu Hall; Amuzu - Amuzu Hall; Amizi - Ebo Hall; Umulanchara/Umuokahia - Ebo Hall; Umuebebe - Umuebebe Hall; Amaimo/Umunkpata - Amizi Central School; Umuogba - Umuogba Village Square; Umuwara - Umuwara Central School; Amangwu - Amangwu Hall; Umudere Umuotuwe Town Hall; Itaja Obohia - Itaja Obohia Civic Hall; Ehere - Ehere Village Square; Itaja Avonkwu - Olokoro Community Hall; Umuolile/Umuchime - Umuotuwe Primary School; Itaja Amaegbu - Itaja Amaegbu Civic Hall
Umuahia South	Ahiaukwu II	Okayiuga/Mbarama - Okayiuga Hall; Obuohia/Umuoji - Umuoji Hall; Umuarokoro/Umuevo - Okwu Community Hall; Umuika - Umuika Hall; Umuajata Ekerifeze - Umuajata Community Hall; Umudu - Umudu Village Hall; Umuokite/ Umuohiri Village. Sq.; Umuobu - Umuobu Town Hall; Umuedere - Umuedere Hall; Umuntu Opara Ozara - Umuntu Town Hall; Itu Isielu - Itu Hall; Itu Mgbedeala/Umuala - Itu Mgbedeala Hall; Ogele - Ogele Civic Hall; Amaukwa - Amaukwa Civic Hall; Umumbala/Amabed - Amaded Hall
Umuahia South	Old Umuahia	Umuezeala - Isi Court; Umuobutu - Old Umuahia Primary School; Umueledi/Umuechokwu - Old Umuahia Primary School; Okwu/Umuovo - Amuzunta Village Square; Umuobia I - Umuobia Town Hall; Umuobia II - Umuobia Town Hall; College Premises
Umuahia South	Amakama	Umuokorokwu/Obizi - Amakama Central School; Ihie Umuigwe - Amakama Central School; Umubioko/Umuelem - Umubioko Hall; Mkpuke/Umunga - Mkpuke Hall; Umuokoroukwu/Obizi - Amakama Central School I; Umubioko / Umuelem - Amakama Central School
Umuahia South	Ubakala 'A'	Mgbarakuma I - Mgbarakuma Primary School; Mgbarakuma II - Mgbarakuma Primary School; Umuorie/Umuere - Umuorie Village Square; Laguru I - Ubakala Central School; Laguru II - Ubakala Central School; Umuokereke - Umuokereke Village Square; Umuosu I - Umuosu Community School; Azuokata/Umuokpo - Ipupe Village Hall; Avodim/Amawom - Avo Nipupe Primary School; Umudinlema - Umudunlema Village Square; Ipupe I - Ogbo Central School; Ipupe II - Ogbo Central School; Umuosu II - Umuosu Community School; Umuozobu/Umuokarakara - Umuoshi Hall; Avodim/Umudinkwa - Avo Nipupe Primary School; Mgbarakuma - Mgbarakuma Primary School; Umuosu III - Umuosu Community School
Umuahia South	Nsirimo	Umuako - St. Peters Primary School; Umudele/Umuerim - Amaekpo Hall; Umuobikwa - Amaise Primary School; Umuokoigwe/Umuyi - Nsirimo Central School; Umuogu/Umudiukwu - St. Joseph Primary School; Umuerim/Umuezu - Umuerim Hall
Umuahia South	Ubakala 'B'	Amibo/Umuoka - Umusoro Hall; Obizi - Obizi Hall; Umuevo - Umuevo Hall; Umuogo/Azuahia - Okporoama Hall; Umuagwu/Umunibo - Umunibo Hall; Nsukwe/Umuezeala - Nsukwe Central School; Nsukwe/Umujibe - Nsukwe Central School; Elugwu/Umuamoro - Elugwu Village Square; Eziama/Umueze - Eziama L. A. School; Umuaroko - Eziama L. A. School; Alamiri/Umualika - Amuzu Central School; Umuokochi/Umuelem - Amuzu Central School; Abam - Community School Abam; Amibo - Amibo Primary School; Uturu/Eziama - Uturu Square
Umu - Nneochi	Amuda	Umucha Village Square; Ugwunagbo Village Square; Mbaraede Village Square; Umubara Village Square; Ugwuozu Village Square; Obinisi Village Square; Ugwuezi Town Hall; Ojide Town Hall; Nkwoagu Maternity Hall; Isuochi Central School I; Isuochi Community School I; Isuochi Central School II; Isuochi Community School II
Umu - Nneochi	Umuaku	Umudi Town Hall; Aguata Town Hall; Umuhu Village Hall; Ndi Ozu Village Square; Obinozu Town Hall; Amakpoke Town Hall; Umuaku Secondary School; Amaogbu Town Hall; Umuaku Community Primary School; Nkwo Ameke; Ugwuawuru Town Hall; Umuejehwo Town Hall; Umudike Town Hall; Obagu Town Hall; Ndioka - Amuogbu Village Square; Agboba Square Amaeke
Umu - Nneochi	Mbala/Achara	Mbaezi Town Hall I; Mbaezi Town Hall II; Mbaezi Agbaqa Square; Umuigwe Town Hall; Ahojala Square; Umukparo Town Hall; Mbaraukwu Square; Umuenyim Village Square; Umuobasi Town Hall; Agwuanyi Village Hall; Achara Village Hall; Agwuanyi Hall
Umu - Nneochi	Ezingodo	Obinohia Town Hall; Umuada Town Hall; Ekeimo Square; Ezingodo Community School; Umuimo Square; Obinagu Primary School; Umuolughu Town Hall
Umu - Nneochi	Ndiawa/Umuelem/I	Ngada Primary School; Amata Community School; Amagu Town Hall; Afor Market Square; Ndiawa/Umuelem/ Ihie/Amorie; Ezi Ndiawa Town Hall; Obi Ohia Village Square; Ngele Market Square; Ozi - Ihie Village Square I; Ozi - Ihie Village Square II; Obinulo Village Square I; Obinulo Prim. Sch I; Obinulo Prim. Sch II; Amokwo Village Square; Ngodo Girls Secondary School I; Obinulo Village Square II; Obinugwu Uhude Village Square; Umuogbokocha Village Square; Ngodo Girls Secondary School II
Umu - Nneochi	Eziama - Ugwu	Mbara Akpaka Square; Mbara Abia Square; Abaa Market Square; Abara Ajala Square; Ndikpa Village Square; Ohuoba Town Hall; Eke Market Square; Mbara Oha Village Square
Umu - Nneochi	Eziama - Agbo	Eziama Community School I; Eziama Community School II; Eziama Civic Hall; Amalato Town Hall; Umuezedinihu Civic Centre; Umuobi Primary School; Umuocha Village Square; Ahia Ututu Market Square
Umu - Nneochi	Ubahu/Akawa/Arokpa	Mkpacha Akawa Village Square; Akawa Village Square; Aroikpa Primary School; Awo Village Square; Ubahu Nneato Community Primary School; Central School Ebelebe; Mbara Utu Village Square; Umuikeme Village Square; Aroikpa Village Square
Umu - Nneochi	Umuchieze I	Amaubiri Primary School; Eziama Village Square; Amamagu Village Square; Uru Primary School; Mbaraigwe Square
Umu - Nneochi	Umuchieze II	Nkoto Uru Village Square; Lokpanta Secondary School I; Lokpanta National School; Nkwo Ukwu Market Square; Jakirija Village Square; Mbara Ikoro Village Square; Lokpanta Secondary School II
Umu - Nneochi	Umuchieze III	Amaegbu Village Square; Umuchieze Central Commercial School; Lekwesi Health Centre; Leru Civic Centre; Mbara Akpu Leru; Mbara Agbala Leru; Umuaka Village Square; Ukwu Fruit Leru
Umu - Nneochi	Obinolu/Obiagu/La	Ngodo State Primary School I; Obinolu Village Square; Obiagu Village Square; Technical Secondary School; Ngodo State Primary School II; Lomara Village Square; Lomara Central School; Alli Village Square; Obohia Village Square; Umulobo Village Square
