= Amuvi =

Coordinates: 5°24′N 07°53′E

Amuvi is a village in Nigeria's Arochukwu Local Government Area of Abia State.
