= Ibere =

Clan in Abia State, Nigeria

Ibere Ndi Ibere
Total population
- <100,000

Languages
- Ibere Igbo, English, Nigerian Pidgin

Religion
- Christianity

Related ethnic groups
- Oboro, Ngwa, Bende, Abam, Aro, Nkari, Ibibio

Ibere is a clan located in the eastern part of Ikwuano Local Government Area, Abia State, Nigeria. It borders Oboro to the west, Bende to the north, the Isuogu (Ariam/Usaka and Oloko) to the south, Itumbauzo and Nkari (a clan in Ini LGA, Akwa Ibom State) to the east. It is one of 18 Igbo clans of the Old Bende Division. Ibere was classified in the Ohuhu-Ngwa cluster of the Southern Igbo area by Forde and Jones.

== Origin ==
It is generally agreed that the founders of the community in its present situation came from a place called Okwa Ankasi, but no one can say where it is located. It is always indicated by a wave of the hand towards the West and South and it seems probable that the ancestors of most of the Ibere villages migrated from the same direction and at approximately the same time as the Ngwa, namely, from the south-west across the Imo River. On the other hand, it is said that Okwa Ankasi was "a big tree" and there are none to the south-west. Information gleaned from the neighbouring Oboro can indicate that Okwa Ankasi was to the east or south-east. The Isuogu, Oboro and Eastern Ngwa are collectively referred to as Okwa by other Igbo communities.

Although nothing definite is known of Ibere in the past, it seems clear that they moved to their present site after severe fighting in which they were driven from their former abode. The earliest arrivals settled near the present Orie Market (Ahia Orie). From there, they scattered and founded the present villages. It is agreed by every village in the clan that Obinyang is the eldest village. The founder of Obinyang was Okenye, who moved to the present site of the village from Ahia Orie soon after his arrival there. The migration from Okwa Ankasi took some time and it is also probable that the founder of some of the villages themselves came from larger villages in the clan. If the accounts given by the Oboro people are accurate, it would appear that Okwa Ankasi lies somewhere south of Oloko and that the earliest Ibere came from Oboro villages as follows; Mbinyang (Isiala Ibere), Umuemenike from Mbiopong (Isiala Oboro), Iyialu, Ihim and Umuru from Amawom, Nkalunta and Iberenta from Ndoro, Inyila and Obuohia from Umugbalu, Amuro from Amaoba, Elemaga from Okwe, Mbubo from Nnono and Ekebedi. The origin of Itunta and Obuoru is partly of Asaga and partly Ibibio (Itu). This version of the history of Ibere people is supported by the fact that the customs of Ibere and Oboro are similar, and they agree that they have a common origin.

Soon after the earliest settlers had established themselves in the vicinity of Ahia Orie, they were much harassed by Abam raiders whose disturbing activities hastened the dispersion of the Ibere people. The Ahia Orie continued to be widely attended until one market day, an Abam raid inflicted heavy losses of lives and property that the market was abandoned. It was re-opened after the advent of the colonial government but on a much smaller scale. The large markets at Obuohia and Ndoro replaced it.

Almost as soon as the clan was established, there was a heavy infiltration of Aro to whom this rich area with river transport to the Inyang Creek held out an inviting prospect in two villages, Nkalunta and Obuoru, two of which are the nearest villages to the Inyang Stream, the Aro population was greater than the indigene's and there was a considerable colony of Aro in every village. The main Aro trade was cocoa which was extensively seen in the rich haw-lying land between Itunta and Obuoru. Transport cost drastically nothing and the trade, though not large, was a lucrative one.

== Culture ==
Like her neighbouring groups, the Ibere mark the Ekpe festival by January yearly. They dress like other Igbo groups. They speak Igbo language but with a sharp difference. Their delicacies aren't much different from the Igbo and Ibibio people and like the Igbo people in other areas, they are an acephalous community.

== Localities ==
• Amuro

• Elemaga

• Iberenta

• Ihim

• Inyila

• Isiala

• Itunta

• Iyalu

• Nkalunta

• Ngwugwo

• Obuohia

• Obuoru

• Umuemenike

• Umulu

== See also ==
• Elemaga
