= Obuohia =

Village in Abia State, Nigeria

Obuohia Obuohia Obi Ibere Autonomous Community
- Village
- Obuohia
- Coordinates: 5°26′3″N 7°36′29″E
- Country: Nigeria
- State: Abia State
- L.G.A: Ikwuano
- Clan: Ibere

Government
  - Type: Monarchy
  - Eze: Eze HRM Dickson I. Orji
- Elevation: 115 m (377 ft)

Population (2023)
  - Total: 4,000
  - Ethnicities: Igbo
  - Religion: Christianity
- Time zone: UTC+1 (WAT)
- 3-digit postal code prefix: 440108
- Area code: 440
- ISO 3166 code: NG.AB.IK
- Website: https://ng.geoview.info/obuohia,7073520

Obuohia is a village in Ibere, Ikwuano Local Government Area of Abia State, Nigeria. Obuohia is the largest village of the Ibere clan and third largest in Ikwuano. It is part of the Obi Ibere Autonomous Community and doubles as the capital. Obuohia is 27km east of Umuahia, Abia State's capital.

== History ==
Obuohia is believed to be derived syntactically from the words Obu (lodge), Ohia (literally means bush but in this context, Ohia is a name of a person). Oral stories have it that the first man to settle in Obuohia is Ohia, in whom is the reason its named Ohia's lodge; Obuohia.

== Culture ==
The community is richly surrounded with numerous cultural displays like the colourful Ekpe and Iri Ji (New Yam) festivals.

== Kindreds ==
Obuohia Ibere is made up of four kindreds which include;

• Umuakoo

• Umuotuu

• Umuodoro • Others

== People ==
The people of Obuohia are predominantly farmers, hunters and business merchants. CLLR Mrs. Edith Ngozi David-Onwunaruwa, Councillor of East Barnet, London, England in the U.K, Samuel Onuigbo, an ex-member representing Ikwuano/Umuahia North and South Constituency at the House of Representatives and Uche Mpamah (late), an ex-Commissioner of Sports for Abia State and former LGA Chairman of Ikwuano are from Obuohia.

== Economy ==
The community members are heavily farmers which makes them a food zone of Ibere. Being over a 100 year old community with over 4,000 inhabitants, its citizens dwell mostly on diverse agricultural plantations which is the major source of income for their livelihood. They accommodate many labourers from neighbouring states like Nkalu in Akwa Ibom, Enugu and Ebonyi States. Their farm products are sold in the markets of Ndoro, Ariam and up to Umuahia. The community observes rest from its farming activities on Orie Ukwu market day which happens to be the market day of Obuohia but the market just like most markets in Ikwuano is no longer functional due to preference of the aforementioned markets. However, a new market was recently constructed.

== See also ==
- List of villages in Abia State
