= Ikwuano =

LGA in Abia State, Nigeria

Ikwuano Ikwuano
- LGA
- Motto: Onye Ahala Nwanneya
- Interactive map of Ikwuano
- Location in Nigeria
- Coordinates: 5°26′N 7°34′E
- Country: Nigeria
- State: Abia State
- Headquarters: Isiala Oboro
- Created: 1991

Government
  - Type: Democratic
  - Local Government Chairman: Dr. Anthony Nzeribe Nwaubani
  - Local Government Deputy Chairman: Hon. Awuwa Lucky Chibuikem

Area
  - Total: 281 km^{2} (108 sq mi)
- Elevation: 122 m (400 ft)

Population (2022)
  - Total: 200,800
  - Density: 715/km^{2} (1,850/sq mi)
- Time zone: UTC+1 (WAT)
- 3-digit postal code prefix: 440
- Area code: 440
- ISO 3166 code: NG.AB.IK

Ikwuano is a Local Government Area of Abia State, Nigeria. Its headquarters is in Isiala Oboro. The name 'Ikwuano' etymologically indicates that there are four different ancient kingdoms that make up the community called Ikwuano. These include Oboro, Ibere, Ariam/Usaka and Oloko.

The postal code of the area is 440. It is one of the five Local Government Areas that make up the Abia Central Senatorial District. As of 2024, the executive chairman is Dr. Anthony Nzeribe Nwaubani. Obi Aguocha currently serves as the Federal Representative representing Ikwuano/Umuahia North and South Federal Constituency at the House of Representatives. The member representing Ikwuano State Constituency at the Abia State House of Assembly is Engr. Boniface Isienyi.

== History ==
The present Ikwuano Local Government Area was part of the Bende Division in the then Southern Province created by the British Colonial Government as part of their "Divide and Rule" system of government and administration towards the beginning of the 19th Century. This was as early as the time Calabar was the capital of Nigeria.

When the Southern province was further divided, Ikwuano still remained part of the Bende Division. The present Bende town was the administrative headquarters where the District Commissioner resided. The District Commissioner, Nwa D.C., as he was known and called held courts at Bende and Oloko. At this time what was later carved out as Aba Division was part of the Bende Division, under the jurisdiction of Nwa D. C. The present Umuahia township later replaced Bende as the administrative headquarters after the extension of the Nigerian rail line from Port-Harcourt to Enugu between 1915 and 1916.

Ikwuano Local Government Area was among the new local government areas that were created on 27 August 1991 when the General Ibrahim Babangida's Administration created Abia State from the old Imo State. It was carved out of the defunct Ikwuano-Umuahia of the Old Imo State.

== Women's War of 1929 ==
The Aba Women's Riot began in Oloko. The demonstration occurred when thousands of women of Igbo origin from Bende, Umuahia, Owerri and other regions in the South East made the trip to Oloko, one of the four principal communities of Ikwuano. The cause of this movement was due to the worry that a new taxation plan was being implemented that would demand women, most especially widows, to pay taxes which they were not mandated to pay earlier on.

== Culture ==
Ikwuano is known for cultures and arts which include Ekpe, which is usually in January in the different Ikwuano communities coinciding with their respective market days, New Yam (Iri-Ji) and Afo Amaghi Onuma festivals. Their cultural dances are Eketensi Ritual dance, Oro, Ikperikpeogu (War Dance), Uko and so on. They also have Oba and Ekpe societies. Popular delicacies in Ikwuano include Ofe Achara, Ukazi Soup and Ugwu Soup. The predominant languages spoken in Ikwuano are Igbo and English languages. The four clans speak distinct Igbo dialects though mutually intelligible. Ikwuano brides are known to have some of the costliest bride prices in Igboland. Traditional marriages are held in high esteem.

== Geography ==
It has an area of 281 km^{2}. It lies between the latitudes 5 24lN and 5 30lN and between the longitudes of 7 32lE and 7 37lE.

It borders Umuahia North and Bende to its north, Umuahia South and Isiala- Ngwa North to its west, Ini to the east and Obot-Akara to the south.

== Demographics ==
The population of Ikwuano during the 2006 census was 137,993. As at 2015, it increased to 175,078. The area is inhabited primarily by the Igbo people.

== Climate ==
It experiences an average weather temperature of 28 °C. The area witnesses two distinct seasons which are the rainy and dry seasons. The average humidity level is put at 62%.

Ikwuano is in the humid forest zone of Nigeria. The Local Government Area has an average rainfall of 2351 mm, average minimum diurnal temperature of 22.9 °C or 73.2 °F and relative humidity range between 80 and 90%.

== Economy & Agriculture ==
The vegetation of the area is predominantly lowland rainforest, which makes it suitable for growing yam, cassava, maize, cashew and ginger. This has led to the area becoming the food basket of Abia State.

Farming is one of the key economic activities of the Ikwuano people. The area also hosts a number of markets where a variety of commodities are bought and sold. They include Ahia Ndoro and the Ariam Market. In fact, Ikwuano is situated in the palm belt of Eastern Nigeria. Other important economic engagements of the Ikwuano people are hunting, craftsmanship and wood carving.

== Villages grouped according to clans ==
The four clans of Ikwuano have a total of 58 villages. They are listed as follows:

Clan	Village
Ariam/Usaka	Amaegbu, Ariam Ala-Ala, Ariam Elu-Elu, Azunchai, Ekpiri Ala-Ala, Ekpiri Elu-Elu, Ekwelu, Ndieke, Ndiokoro, Ndiorie, Obugwu, Obeama, Oboni, Upa, Usaka Ukwu
Ibere	Amuro, Elemaga, Iberenta, Ihim, Inyila, Isiala Ibere, Itunta, Iyalu, Nkalunta, Ngwugwo, Obuohia, Obuoru, Umuemenike, Umulu
Oboro	Ahuwa, Amaoba Ikputu, Amaoba Ime, Amawom, Aro Ajatakiri, Aro Ayama, Ekebedi, Isiala Oboro, Ndoro, Nnono, Ntalakwu, Obukwu, Ogbuebulle, Okwe, Umuariaga, Umudike, Umugbalu, Umuigu, Umuokwo
Oloko	Ahaba, Akanu Nchara, Amizi, Awomukwu, Azuiyi, Etoruo Nchara, Obuohia Okike, Oloko, Umugo, Usaka Eleogu

== Autonomous communities ==
Villages in Ikwuano are constitutionally placed under 43 autonomous communities, each autonomous community is led by an Eze.

Autonomous Community	Village(s)
Abaa Ukwu	Amaoba Ikputu
Afa	Etoruo Nchara
Afa Ukwu	Akanu Nchara
Agbalu Ozu	Umugbalu
Agbo Ibere	Elemaga
Agumba	Ekwelu
Ahaba Ukwu	Ahaba
Ahuwa Oboro	Ahuwa
Ajata Na Igu	Umuigu, Aro Ajatakiri
Ala-Ala Oboro	Ogbuebulle, Ekebedi
Amanchai	Azunchai, Obeama
Amaoba Ime	Amaoba Ime
Ariam Ala-Ala	Ariam Ala-Ala
Ariam Osoigwe	Ariam Elu-Elu, Ndiorie
Awom Na Ebo	Umuariaga, Umuokwo
Awom Na Uzie	Amizi
Awom Oboro	Amawom
Awomukwu	Awomukwu
Ekpiri Onyeike	Ekpiri Ala-Ala
Ekpiri Osoaji	Ekpiri Elu-Elu
Ibere Ancient Kingdom	Ngwugwo, Umulu
Ibeuzo Ukwu	Amawom
Ikemba	Oboni, Ndieke, Ndiokoro, Upa
Ikputu Oboro	Amaoba Ikputu
Isiala Ahaba	Ahaba
Isiama Oboro	Isiala Oboro, Obukwu
Ntalakwu Oboro	Ntalakwu
Obi Ibere	Obuohia, Umuemenike
Obuohia Okike	Obuohia Okike
Okwe Ukwu	Okwe
Oloko	Azuiyi, Oloko, Umugo, Usaka Eleogu
Oro Ibere	Iberenta, Iyalu
Oruigwe	Nnono
Oru Oboro	Ndoro, Aro Ayama
Otu-Uzo	Amuro, Nkalunta, Ihim
Ugwuegbu	Obugwu, Amaegbu
Ugwu Ibere	Inyila, Isiala Ibere
Uha-la-Uda	Nnono
Umuakoo	Itunta, Obuoru
Umuokeigbo	Umuigu
Umudike	Umudike
Umudike Ukwu	Umudike
Usaka Ukwu	Usaka Ukwu

== Traditional rulers ==
Title	Name	Autonomous Community
Eze Kwesiri I of Abaa Ukwu	Eze HRM David Chukwuemeka Isinguzo	Abaa Ukwu
Chimere I of Etoruo	Eze HRM N. Hart Agunaegbe (JP)	Afa
Eze Oha III of Afa Ukwu	Eze HRM Okeugo Okwuenyia	Afa Ukwu
Efuma II of Agbalu Ozu	Eze HRM Justice Chino Uwaga	Agbalu Ozu
Agbo I of Agbo Ibere	Eze HRM Ifeanyi Oluwa	Agbo Ibere
Agu I of Agumba	Eze HRM Joseph Obaji	Agumba
Eze Ukwu I of Ahaba Ukwu	Eze HRM Dr. Chimezie Nwabueze	Ahaba Ukwu
N/A	Vacant	Ahuwa Oboro
Eze Onye Oruru I of Ajatanaigu	Eze HRM Larry Ogbonnaya Agwu	Ajata Na Igu
Eze Ala II of Ala-Ala Oboro	Eze HRM Ezeji Uzu Analaba	Ala-Ala Oboro
Igwebuike I of Amanchai	Eze HRM Smart Bartholomew Ndukwe	Amanchai
O'tuwa I of Amaoba Ime	Eze HRM Emmanuel Nwankwo O'tuwa	Amaoba Ime
Ala I of Ariam Ala-Ala	Eze HRM Onyekwere Onwualimba	Ariam Ala-Ala
Igwe I of Ariam Osoigwe	Eze HRM Daniel Adieze Gbufor	Ariam Osoigwe
Ugwuoha I of Awom Na Ebo	Eze HRM Christopher Uzumgba Ejirika	Awom Na Ebo
Eze Udo I of Awom Na Uzie	Eze HRM Dr. Eugene Chimezie Ndimele	Awom Na Uzie
Awom II of Awom Oboro	Eze HRM Elder Chukwudike Ebila Ironsi	Awom Oboro
N/A	Vacant	Awomukwu
N/A	Vacant	Ekpiri Onyeike
Eze Okpu II of Ekpiri Osoaji	Eze HRM Andrew Igbokwe Ekpo	Ekpiri Osoaji
Eze Ugo I of Ibere Ancient Kingdom	Eze HRM Williams Ugochukwu	Ibere Ancient Kingdom
Uzo II of Ibe Uzo	Eze HRM Prof. Innocent C. Ezeala	Ibeuzo Ukwu
N/A	Vacant	Ikemba
Ikputu I of Ikputu Oboro	Eze HRM Chijioke Imo	Ikputu Oboro
Ahaba II of Isiala Ahaba	Eze HRM Charles Onorchie Ukattah	Isiala Ahaba
Isioha II of Isiama	Eze HRM Prof. Sunday C. Ezeribe	Isiama Oboro
Apu I of Ntalakwu	Eze HRM Prof. Samuel Ajiri	Ntalakwu Oboro
Obioma I of Obi Ibere	Eze HRM Dr. Dickson I. Orji	Obi Ibere
Okike I of Obuohia Okike	Eze HRM Mgbeonyere C. Eleribe	Obuohia Okike
N/A	Vacant	Okwe Ukwu
Oko II of Oloko	Eze HRM Sir Sunday Nnamdi Nwosu	Oloko
Oro II of Oro Ibere	Eze HRM Dr. Stanley Iroabuchi Ijenwa	Oro Ibere
Igwebuike II of Oruigwe	Eze HRM Chukwuemeka Elefuanya Ezeoma	Oruigwe
Oru I of Oru Onyerubi	Eze HRM Ralph Ukachi Ogbonna	Oru Oboro
Uzo II of Otu-Uzo	Eze HRM Chidi Hyacinth Kalu	Otu-Uzo
Chimere I of Ugwuegbu	Eze HRM Ambrose Obileche Nwagwu	Ugwuegbu
Ugwu I of Ugwu Ibere	Eze HRM Prof. Ezeudo Samuel Ifenwanta	Ugwu Ibere
Uha I of Uha-la-Uda	Eze HRM Chukwuemeka Aguocha Ukenye	Uha-la-Uda
Akoo II of Umuakoo	Eze HRM Monday Unadindu Okoro	Umuakoo
Igwebuike I of Umuokeigbo	Eze HRM Valentine C. Ohunta	Umuokeigbo
Dike Oha II of Umudike	Eze HRM Onyekwere Joseph Anyaegbu	Umudike
Dike Ukwu I of Umudike	Eze HRM Benjamin Ogechimereze Oriaku	Umudike Ukwu
Eze Oha II of Usaka Ukwu	Eze HRM Victor Peter Nwosu	Usaka Ukwu

== Executive Chairmen (1992-till date) ==
Tenure	Name
1992-1995	Sir Chima Odomegbulam Onyemachi
1995-1997	Promise Odinkemere
1997-1999	Chief Uche Mpamah
1999-2003	Barr. Kevin Chima Ugboajah
2003-2007	Barr. Kevin Chima Ugboajah
2008-2010	Barr. Stanley Ojigbo
2016-2018	Ezinne Ngozi Orji
2020-2022	Chief Stephen Mpamugo
2024-	Dr. Anthony Nzeribe Nwaubani

== Educational Institutions ==
- Michael Okpara University of Agriculture, Umudike
- Amadeus University, Amizi
- National Root Crops Research Institute, Umudike
- Oboro Secondary School, Ikwuano
- Ikwuano Secondary School, Ariam
- Ibere Comprehensive Senior Secondary School, Ahia Orie, Ibere
- Wesley Seminary, Ndoro Oboro
- National Teacher's Institute, Oboro Ikwuano Study Centre

== Notable people ==
- Ashley Nwosu, Nollywood actor
- Justice Ferdinand Ukattah, first Chief Judge of Abia State
- Buchi Atuonwu, Nigerian reggae gospel artiste
- Adanma Okpara, wife of the first Premier of the defunct Eastern Region of Nigeria; Michael Okpara
- Kenneth Omeruo, Nigerian footballer
- Christian Omeruo, Nigerian footballer
- Lucky Omeruo, Nigerian footballer
- Austin Akobundu, former Minister of State for Defence and Retired Colonel
- Pascal Atuma, Canadian-Nigerian actor, screenwriter, film producer, director, comedian and CEO/Chairman of TABIC
- Oscar Atuma, Canadian-Nigerian actor and film producer
- Godwin Nwabunka, Nigerian development expert & microfinance professional
- Nwanyeruwa, leader of the Aba Women's Riot of 1929
- Sandie Okoro, British lawyer
- Frank Dallas, Nollywood actor
- Samson Omeruah, former Governor of Anambra State
- Jimmy Johnson, Nollywood actor
- Erica Nlewedim, Nigerian actress, model, entrepreneur and ex-BBN housemate
- Henry Ikoh, Nigerian politician
- Stanley Nwabuisi, Nigerian politician
- Rev (Fr.) Christian Anokwuru, pioneer Catholic Priest of Ikwuano
- Ogbonnaya Oji, ex-Biafran commander
- Chigul, Nigerian comedienne and actress
- Emeka Okoro, Nollywood actor and gospel artiste
- Atiwurcha Sylvanus, Nigerian politician
- Onyinyechi Mark, Nigerian powerlifter
- Brenda Ndukwe, Nollywood actress
- Emeka Atuma, Nigerian politician
- Ccioma, Nigerian gospel artiste and songwriter
- CJ Ujah, British athlete
- Paul Omeruo, former military administrator of Kogi State
- Augustine Ukattah, Nigerian politician
- Monday Ubani, ex-NBA vice president
- Onyinyechi Ironkwe, former Miss Niger Delta 2015/16
- Johnbull Owoh, former Nigerian envoy to Brazil and Guinea Bissau
- Chris Nkulor, Nollywood actor
- Sir Sunday Nwosu, Nigerian activist and founder of the Independent Shareholders Association of Nigeria (ISAN)
- Samuel Onuigbo, Nigerian politician
- Christian Dimkpa, PhD., first black Chief Agricultural Scientist and Head of Department at the Connecticut Agricultural Experiment Station, New Haven United States.

== See also ==
- List of villages in Abia State
