= Nnono =

Village in Abia State, Nigeria

Nnono Nnogho
- Village
- Location of Nnono in Nigeria
- Coordinates: 5°25′47.6″N 7°32′50.2″E
- Country: Nigeria
- State: Abia State
- L.G.A: Ikwuano
- Clan: Oboro

Government
  - Type: Monarchy
  - Eze: HRH Eze Chukwuemeka Elefuanya Ezeoma (Oruigwe) & HRH Eze Chukwuemeka Aguocha Ukenye (Uha-la-Uda)
- Elevation: 144 m (472 ft)

Population
  - Ethnicities: Igbo
  - Religion: Christianity
- Time zone: UTC+1 (WAT)
- 3-digit postal code prefix: 440109
- Area code: 440
- ISO 3166 code: NG.AB.IK
- Website: https://ng.geoview.info/nnono,2328762

Nnono is a village in Oboro, Ikwuano Local Government Area, Abia State, Nigeria. Nnono has common boundaries with Amaoba, Umugbalu, Ndoro, Ahuwa, Olokoro and Ngwa. Nnono consists of two autonomous communities (Uha-la-Uda and Ọruigwe) and six sub-villages (Umuohu, Umuosoro, Nnono-Etiti, Umumba, Umuogwara and Oronta).

== Origin ==
Mazi Ohu Nnono of Ibeku was the first to settle at the present Nnono Oboro. He named the whole area after his father's name and his own compound, he named after his own name (Umuohu). Mazi Ohu was ejected out by his family as a penalty for family disobedience. When Mazi Etiti of Etiti Ulo Bende was forced out from Bende by necessity, he settled with Mazi Ohu Nnono at one end of Oboro and named it Nnono Etiti. Mazi Oshoro travelled from Uzuakoli in search of abode place and settled at the western part of Nnono (Ụmụ Oshoro). Mazi Eme Agwara who was begat by Mazi Odogbo Ajonu, the father of Amaoba and Ndioru settled at Nnono and founded the fourth compound in Nnono (Umuogwara). Mazi Mba (Umumba came from Umueze in Ngwa) and made Nnono's fifth compound. At last, the three hamlets Oronta who came from Okpuala Ngwa, Arochukwu and Nkalu in Ubibia settled at the northern part of Nnono and made Nnono have six compounds. It is now obvious that Isi ama Isi came from different places either in search of animals or abode place. Nnono and Okwe were relatives while each and every village had their relationship according to how and where they came from. There was a powerful god named Ele-Nnono generally feared by those who knew it. It was the god of insanity which caused offenders to run mad. Nkwo days are their market days. Mazi Njoku Nkalu of Nnono Etiti was the most senior man as at that time.

== Culture ==
Nnono is one of the socially vibrant communities in Ikwuano with social activities like the Ekpe and Ntaka festivals.

== See also ==
• List of villages in Abia State
