= Oboro (Nigeria) =

Clan in Abia State, Nigeria

Oboro Ndi Oboro
Oboro

Total population
- 70,407 (1921)

Languages
- Oboro Igbo, English, Nigerian Pidgin

Religion
- Christianity (majority methodist)

Related ethnic groups
- Ibere, Ibeku, Ngwa, Asa, Ndoki, Bende, Abam, Aro, Itumbauzo, Ibibio

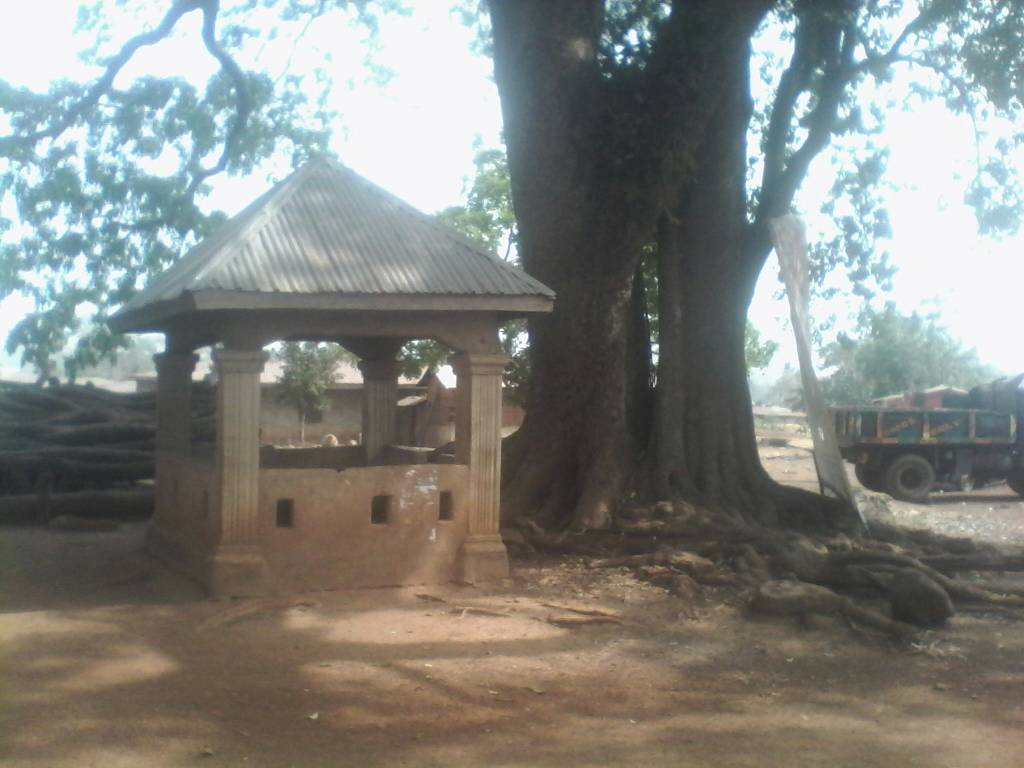
Oboro Clan place in Abia State, Nigeria

Oboro is the largest of four clans in Ikwuano Local Government Area of Abia State, Nigeria. It is bounded to the north by Ibeku and Bende clans, west by the Olokoro and Ngwa, east by Ibere and south by the Isuogu (Ariam/Usaka and Oloko). Oboro was classified in the Ohuhu-Ngwa cluster of the Southern Igbo area by British anthropologists Forde and Jones. It is also one of 18 Igbo clans in the Old Bende Division of the defunct Owerri Province. The Oboro speak a common language with the other 17 clans of the Bende Division though dialectal variations exist. These clans share a history of inter-ethnic relations.

== Origin ==
The earliest settlers in Oboro came from Bende, Ngwa and Ukwa areas. They defeated the Ibibio aborigines at Mbiopong (now known as Isiala) and settled first at Ahiafor and later moved down to Ahuwa where they settled. Some of the Ibibios retreated to their kins at Nkari, while others retired to a little outpost about a mile south-west of Mbiopong. Today, that settlement is known as Obukwu (formerly Obunta).

One of the early groups to settle in the Oboro area came with two deities namely Ikenga Oboro, a male god and Ala Oboro, the wife. When the priest of Ala Oboro died, his wife married from the defeated people of Mbiopong and ran back to her people with the deity. Before this, Ikenga Oboro had become a terror to the people of Ahuwa who were glad to get rid of it. Thus, when Ala Oboro was taken to Mbiopong, the people of Ahuwa village readily accepted and were seeking to transfer Ikenga's ire to Mbiopong, they directed all people who came to offer sacrifices to Ikenga to send them to Ala Oboro where Ikenga might as well enjoy the sacrifice with his wife. By this, Mbiopong, the home of the original settlers of Oboro, became the headquarters of Oboro.

Some of the villages claim that they are descendants of the men who had formerly lived at Mbiopong but had left there due to a scarcity of water and had moved to the site of their present villages where water was abundant. Water was scarce at Mbiopong though other parts of Oboro were and are still well-watered. The people of Mbiopong claim that they originally came from Umuemenike, a village of the Ibere clan. Other villages state that their ancestors came from different villages. Thus, Ekebedi say that they came originally from the Ntalakwu villages of Itu in Bende Ofufa near the Ikot Ekpene boundary. Ogbuebulle say that their ancestors originated from Idima Abam and settled at Amaoba, an Oboro village and that in the course of time a dispute arose. Consequently, the ancestors of the present village of Ogbuebulle left Amaoba and settled at Ogbuebulle. Umuohu was the oldest settlement in Nnono amongst the five different hamlets, each of which has its own version of history of origin. Oronta, which was an independent community, later joined Nnono, thereby making it six hamlets. Oronta is made up of three hamlets; Okpuala, Umugbari and Ubibia. History has it that two brothers; Ebuta and Otogu from Ubibia in Itumbauzo migrated to Oronta in the 17th century to establish a new settlement. Okwe arrived Oboro from Ukwa Nkasi of the Aro area, headed by a man from Akpakara compound. Ndoro came from Amaoba, the family of Mazi Odugbo Ajonu of Abam. Ogbuebulle village is on the same base with Ndoro.

Ekweri village is the offspring of Mbiopong and it is now the boundary between Oboro and Ariam.

== Socio-political structure ==
Naturally, Oboro is divided into eight units of communities known as Oboro Isiama Asato, namely: Mbiopong, Ikwueke (Ntalakwu, Ahuwa and Umuigu), Ekweri, Ogbuebulle, Amaoba, Ndoro, Okwe, Awom Na Ebo (Amawom, Umudike, Umugbalu, Umuariaga, Umuokwo and Amanya).

In ancient times, Oboro generally had every Afo Uku day as a big market and worshipping day. They had a market called Ahia Afor in which they held meetings and took final decisions on every matter affecting Oboro as a whole.

In Ahia Afor, all animals used for sacrifices are being shared according to the rank of Juju recognition in Oboro.

Ogbuebulle, which is part and parcel of the Amaoba family and Ekweri, which is part and parcel of Mbiopong were separated from their families during the grouping because of their far distance from their families.

For easy governance, the eight villages (Isiama Asato) were divided into two equal parts that are:

i) Akpakpanta

ii) Akpakpaukwu

- Akpakpanta: Mbiopong, Ikwueke, Ekweri and Ogbuebulle.

- Akpakpaukwu: Nnono, Amaoba, Okwe and Awom Na Ebo.

Whenever there are any dividends, the Akpakpantas get first and carry the head of any animal slaughtered in Oboro as a whole. Then the Akpakpaukwu headed by Nnono get last and carry the jaw of the animal. The 'Ukwu' and 'Nta' as suffixed on the Akpakpas indicates those villages who have high and lower populations in Oboro, and not that anyone is superior to the other.

However, as the headquarters, Mbiopong (now Isiala) is attached to the Ntas. It is regarded as the eldest of the Ntas.

There is another type of seniority in Oboro as a whole, and that is Juju recognition. Mbiopong comes first for they cared for Ala Oboro. Ahuwa comes second for they cared for Ikenga Oboro (Juju). Ekweri comes third for they cared for Ogwuma Oboro. Nnono comes fourth for they are the first to serve Ala Oboro with 'Osia' first, before any celebration, then comes other villages according to their merits.

== Culture ==
The Oboro people celebrate the Ekpe festival by January annually which is followed by a New Yam Festival. It is a festival commonly practiced by her neighbors both in Ikwuano and Umuahia, though it was invented by the Efik-Ibibio. The Oboro people speak Igbo (the third most populous language in Nigeria) but like other Igbo groups, have a unique dialect. Nnono communities speak a similar dialect with the Ngwa, while other villages in Oboro do so with the Bende people. For instance, "how are you" in the Ngwa dialect is "ndighi otu i nu" while the Oboro say "ndighi mkpa imere". The Bende and Oboro people both use "Owara" and "Ka" in greeting. The Oboro are known to be warriors, also to be industrialistic and hospitable in nature. They boast of a rich cultural heritage and dress like other groups in Igboland. Ofe Achara with Akpuruakpu Elile alongside Eba is a dish that is well consumed by the Oboro people. They are predominantly traders, farmers and hunters. The arrival of British missionaries in the last century facilitated the advent of Christianity in Oboroland, hence, it is now dominantly practiced.

== Villages ==
Oboro clan consists of 19 villages which are :

- Ahuwa
- Amaoba Ikputu
- Amaoba Ime
- Amawom
- Aro Ajatakiri
- Aro Ayama
- Ekebedi
- Isiala
- Ndoro
- Nnono
- Ntalakwu
- Obukwu
- Ogbuebulle
- Okwe
- Umuariaga
- Umudike
- Umugbalu
- Umuigu
- Umuokwo

Autonomous communities exist within these villages.

Ahuwa, Ntalakwu and Umuigu are the group of communities that constitute Ikwueke; a kindred of the Oboro clan.

Aro Ayama (part of Oru) and Aro Ajatakiri are communities of Aro ancestry living amongst the Oboro people.

== Notable people ==
- Ashley Nwosu - Nigerian actor
- Buchi Atuonwu - Nigerian gospel artiste
- Henry Ikoh - Nigerian politician
- Chigul - Nigerian comedienne and actress
- Johnbull Chukwuora Owoh - former Nigerian envoy to Brazil and Guinea Bissau
- Samson Omeruah - Nigerian Air Force Officer and ex-Governor of Anambra State

== See also ==
- Abam
- Ibere
