= Elemaga =

Village in Abia State, Nigeria

Elemaga Elemaga Agbo Ibere Autonomous Community
- Village
- Location of Elemaga in Nigeria
- Coordinates: 5°26′26.4″N 7°36′57.8″E
- Country: Nigeria
- State: Abia State
- L.G.A: Ikwuano
- Clan: Ibere

Government
  - Type: Monarchy
  - Eze: HRM Ifeanyi Oluwa
- Elevation: 94 m (308 ft)

Population (2023)
  - Total: 3,000
  - Ethnicities: Igbo
  - Religion: Christianity
- Time zone: UTC+1 (WAT)
- 3-digit postal code prefix: 440108
- Area code: 440
- ISO 3166 code: NG.AB.IK
- Website: https://ng.geoview.info/elemaga,7073518

Elemaga is a small farming village in Ibere, Ikwuano, Abia State, Nigeria. Elemaga is located in the center of Inyila, Isiala Ibere, Ahia Orie, Iberenta, Itunta and Obuoru at the food belt of Ibere, about 15 km southwest of Umuahia, the Abia State capital. Elemaga is believed to be derived syntactically from the words Ele ("look"), Ma ("well") and Ga ("go") which literally means "look well before you go". Climate is tropical monsoon.

== History ==
The history of Elemaga is still sketchy in general view of the Ibere community, where some argue that their ancestors moved downward with the Jewish tribes of Israel who vacated Egypt during the mass exodus of Pharaoh's era before the colonial period. Others contend that the ancestors may have migrated with Olokoro/Ibeku in Umuahia during the stone era.

== Kindreds ==
Elemaga is composed of Ono-Mara-Ano (four clans), namely;

1. Umunyiaokwu
2. Ngboko
3. Nlialanyi
4. Agbommiri

There are some other kinsmen in Ahaba, Ntalakwu and Bende in neighboring Bende Local Government Area also in Abia State.

== Government ==
Elemaga people receive day-to-day government authority at a local level in Ama-ala (the village assembly), through the help of the town crier (PRO). The village assembly is made up of Onyeisi (the chief or village leader), the elders, men, women and youths. Since century back, Elemaga has maintained an Ama ogwu (village square) with the Agbala (sacred courtroom) at its centre. Agbala is an ancient special jurisdiction. The term Agbala is used interchangeably to refer to village judiciary courtroom headed by Nna-Ezi (the oldest man).

== Culture ==
The burial of an Elemaga man or woman is the responsibility of the deceased family and of the village. Umunna (the first male son in the family) and Umuada (the first daughters of the family) play an important role for the peaceful atmosphere of the village, by settling communal and family disputes such as farmland disputes, economic use of trees, sand and communal land.

The fourth smallest village among the 14 villages of the Ibere community, it is richly surrounded with numerous cultural displays like the Ekpe Festival. Elemaga's cultural heritage is diverse, some of them are Itu Ogwu, Ekpe, Oboni, Okonko and many others.

Elemaga people share sociocultural similarities with their neighbouring villages such as the Ekpe Festival, New yam festival, Oboni Dance, Ekpe masquerade, Okonko Dance and ubochi owu (resting market day). Major ceremonies such as marriage, burial, and traditional dance share striking resemblance among her relatives in the diaspora.

The language of Elemaga Ibere is typical Igbo language with a sharp difference.

== Religion ==
In contrast to what was believed a century ago, there is no evidence of pre-Christian significance in the small farming village of Elemaga Ibere, however Christianity is now dominantly practiced.

== Economy & infrastructure ==
There are farmers, hunters and chiefs as well as engineers, lawyers, bankers, lecturers and business merchants. The 3,000 inhabitants work in cocoa plantations and palm oil plantations which are the major sources of income for their livelihood. They accommodate many labourers from neighbouring villages like Nkari in Akwa Ibom, Enugu, Ebonyi, Umuahia, Bende, Ohafia and various other parts of the country and beyond. Their farm products are sold in Ahia Orie, Ahia Ndoro, Ahia Ariam and Ahia Ogwumabiri Ibeku, also known as Umuahia Modern Market. The community observes rest from its farming activities on the Nkwo market day. What could be referred to as one of the oldest primary school(s) ( Ahia Orie Central School) in the entire Ibere clan is situated in Elemaga.

Development and urbanisation are rapidly coming to Elemaga. The provision of electricity and the Elemaga–Ibere road were traced back to Orji Uzor Kalu the former governor of Abia State. Tensions escalated in Elemaga, Itunta, Obuoru and her neighbouring villages on Elemaga erosion sites and the famous bridge that links to the rich farming villages of Itunta, Obuoru and Nkalunta. The economic road is the shortest way of transporting their agricultural produce.

== See also ==
- List of villages in Abia State
- Ibere
