= Ntighuzo Amairi =

Community in Obingwa, Abia State, Nigeria

- Community
- Location in Nigeria
- Coordinates: 5°05′08″N 7°28′25″E
- Country: Nigeria
- State: Abia State
- LGA: Obingwa

Government
  - Type: Monarchy
  - Eze: Isreal Uduko
  - Council: The Palace Council

Ntighuzo Amairi is a community in Obingwa local government area of Abia State. It is one of the communities that make up the Eastern Ngwa region. They speak the Ngwa dialect of the Ngwa people.
