= Umudike =

Town in Abia State, Nigeria

Umudike Umudike
- Town
- Location of Umudike in Nigeria
- Coordinates: 5°28′0″N 7°33′0″E
- Country: Nigeria
- State: Abia State
- L.G.A: Ikwuano
- Clan: Oboro

Government
  - Type: Monarchy
  - Eze: HRM Eze Benjamin Ogechimereze Oriaku (Umudike Ukwu) & HRM Joseph Onyekwere Anyaegbu (Umudike)

Area
  - Total: 0.135 km^{2} (0.052 sq mi)
- Elevation: 143 m (469 ft)

Population (2015)
  - Total: 2,687
  - Density: 19,960/km^{2} (51,700/sq mi)
  - Ethnicities: Igbo
  - Religion: Christianity
- Time zone: UTC+1 (WAT)
- 3-digit postal code prefix: 440109
- Area code: 440
- ISO 3166 code: NG.AB.IK
- Website: https://ng.geoview.info/umudike,2320530

Umudike is a semi-urban settlement in Oboro, Ikwuano Local Government Area in Abia State, Nigeria. It is about 11 kilometers southeast of Umuahia, the state's capital city. It is home to the Michael Okpara University of Agriculture and the National Root Crops Research Institute. Umudike is composed of two autonomous communities which are Umudike and Umudike Ukwu.

The town is surrounded by other neighbouring communities in which it shares its common beliefs and socio-cultural ethics with. They include; Umuariaga, Amaoba, Amawom, Nnono, Ndoro and Ahuwa. These towns accommodate about 40% of students from the Michael Okpara University.

== History ==
The word 'Umudike' translates to 'descendants of Dike' from Igbo.

The progenitor of Umudike, Dike was a descendant of Mazi Awom who begot nine children namely: Mazi Ija (Mgbaja), Mmiri (Agbommiri), Obia (Umuobia), Chukwu (Mbachukwu), Kamanu (Mbakamanu), Aga (Agah), Ishiara (Mbaisara), Ukomu (Umuokom) and Dike (Umudike). Mazi Dike begot three children namely; Okwuta (Umukwuru and Ezi Uku), Umuofo (Umuoke and Umudiogu) and Umuelele (Agbomgbe and Ezi Uku).

Umudike is a compound from Amawom. It was posted to its present location to guide against enemies.

== Culture ==
The town is known for its popular 'Ekpe' festival which is held every January. This festival attracts a number of tourists from neighbouring states and even countries.

== See also ==
1. Amawom
2. Michael Okpara University of Agriculture
3. National Root Crops Research Institute
