= Amawom =

Town in Abia State, Nigeria

Amawom Amawom
- Town
- Amawom
- Location of Amawom in Nigeria
- Coordinates: 5°28′0″N 7°34′0″E
- Country: Nigeria
- State: Abia State
- L.G.A: Ikwuano
- Clan: Oboro

Government
  - Type: Monarchy
  - Eze: Eze HRM Elder Chukwudike Ebila Ironsi (Awom Oboro) & Eze HRM Prof. Innocent C. Ezeala (Ibeuzo Ukwu)
- Elevation: 137 m (449 ft)

Population (2023)
  - Total: 15,000
  - Ethnicities: Igbo
  - Religion: Christianity
- Time zone: UTC+1 (WAT)
- 3-digit postal code prefix: 440109
- Area code: 440
- ISO 3166 code: NG.AB.IK
- Website: https://ng.geoview.info/amawom,7073524

Amawom is a town in Oboro, Ikwuano Local Government Area of Abia State, Nigeria. The name is derived from two words; Ama meaning location and Awom meaning farm. Amawom is believed to have been discovered in the 18th century. Awom Oboro and Ibeuzo Ukwu are the autonomous communities of Amawom. English and Igbo are the languages spoken in the town.

== History ==
Amawom is made up of 10 villages namely; Mgbaja, Agbommiri, Umuobia, Mbachukwu, Umuokom, Mbakamanu, Mbaisara, Aga, Amaya and Aruamaeke.

History had it that the present composition of Amawom has not always been so, but that the different villages migrated from different areas to the present settlement. The present harmony in culture is as a result of age long years of social and cultural interaction. In the pre-colonial days when there were still vast unoccupied lands in different areas, people migrated from one location to another in search of better conditions of living. This could either be in quest for better land, portable water or just a more accommodating space. This movement could also be as a result of inter-tribal squabbles and wars. Such conditions aforementioned necessitated the migration of the present inhabitants of Amawom from their previous locations. Oral tradition has it that the first settlers in Amawom are the Mgbajas. They migrated and settled with other settlers first at Olori Oboro where presently there is a customary court. It is said that at a point in time, a member of one of the nuclear families in Olori called Igbo Nwanyi owned a cow. This cow grazed freely in the surrounding bushes. A time came when there was a drought and water became scarce. The cow started going long distances, sometimes staying some days out before returning home. They noticed however that each time the cow returned, it carried white clay (nzu) on its legs. So they suspected that there must be a stream wherever the cow went to drink water. With this reasoning, Igbo Nwanyi sent his slaves to trail the cow in its next grazing journey. The slaves followed the cow and were led to a stream where they saw earlier foot prints of the cow. The slaves reported back to their master, who then took his family and slaves and settled near the stream which he called ‘Iyi Ukwu” (big stream). That first spot in which they settled had many umbrella-like trees called ‘Uru’. Hence, the place is called ‘Mbara Uru' (Uru Arena). This spot consequently became the center for all socio-cultural and commercial activities in Amawom. The Mgbaja being the earliest settlers have the status of the first son (opara) in Amawom. After the Mgbajas, came another group migrating from Bende. They settled near Mgbaja and are known as Agbommiri. This reflects the location of the village acting as the water receptacle of the town (‘ndi mmiri na ebulatari aku’) as all waterfalls drain towards Agbommiri. Umuobia, the third settlers came from Ohokobe Ndume. Their ancestor, Obia settled north of Mgbaja. The people still maintain some links with their kinsmen at Ohokobe Ndume as they exchange visits during festivals. The next after Umuobia was Mbaisara. They migrated from Iyalu in Ibere. Next in sequence was Aga. They migrated from Bende too. The first man to settle from Ndiokoro Ukwu Bende in Aga was Maazi Ikpo. He as a result of a minor misunderstanding arising from the inception of exalted beings to hold and control certain offices of serving their juju which he was against, left to settle somewhere which he located at Ukpom Bende where he had old friends who previously occupied the town before him. He settled with his two sons; Amaobi and Nwulu. They later continued their journey leaving majority of their relatives at Ukpom Bende and finally settling at Amawom. He was a prominent farmer and blacksmith, he produced hoes, cutlasses and local guns. He acquired enough land for his descendants. Aga came with her own culture. Every child born in Aga must unfailingly have a nickname. This does not cause any dispute among them. It is inherited from their ancestors. After Aga followed, the Mbachukwu were next, they also migrated from Bende. Then followed the Mbakamanu, their ancestors first settled at Ekebedi in Oboro from where they eventually settled in Amawom at last. The next was Umuokom, their ancestor Okom, migrated from Mbom in Ibeku. The next was Amaya. They migrated from Isiala Oboro, formerly called Mbiopong. The last settlers were the Aru Amaeke people. They migrated from Arochukwu.

== Culture ==
Amawom is a town rich in culture. According to their customs, the hamlets share their rites commonly in order of merit in their activities holding in Amawom. Festivals in Amawom include: Igba Mgba, Iri Iji, Igbu Ehi, Uju Agbala, Igba Ikoro, Uju Ede, Iri Ero, Isi Okonko, Egwu Ikpa, Inya Agwo, Izu Ahia, Igba Ekpe etc. Among the cultural heritage of Amawom people is the Ekpe festival which has its climax at the beheading of a goat with one stroke of a matchet by a masquerade.

== Economy ==
Economically, Amawom is rich. They have enough farmland in which they cultivate to produce different kinds of food such as garri, melon, yam, maize, cocoyam, pumpkin, cocoa, plantain, banana, palm oil, timber and many others which are sold at cheap prices. When all these items are sold in their daily market which starts at 4pm and closes by 7pm, it yields a lot of revenue for the Amawom people. Amawom is also a commercial center, many villages in Oboro come to Amawom for trading. Mbara Uru Market is the center for commerce and trade. Amawom is blessed with different kinds of natural resources such as good drinking water, farmland, economic trees, wildlife, forests etc.

== Religion ==
There are two types of religions practiced in Amawom. They are Christianity and the Traditional religions. The Christians are to obey the commandments of God and follow the teachings of Jesus Christ. The traditionalists worship deities. The oracles in Amawom are Ogwuma, Ahia Njoku, Ala Isi Ama etc. The only person permitted to make sacrifices to these gods is a chief priest. When the priest dies, the next elderly person in the family succeeds him.

== Politics ==
During pre-colonial era, Amawom had no chief. The system of government was segmental. Decision making was based on different autonomous groups that are within the family level. Policy making was always carried out in the house of the eldest man of the family. The amalgamation of the Northern and Southern Protectorates in 1914 caused Amawom to have her first Chief in Chief Okukuru who was then succeeded by Chief Iroatu, then High Chief Nzeribe Orunta, then the last Chief before the creation of autonomy was Chief N.N. Okey. As a result of the creation of more autonomous communities, Amawom got two autonomous communities and they are: Ibe Uzo and Awom. The first Eze of Awom was Late HRH Eze U. Orunta, and Ibe Uzo's was Late HRH Major Irole. Presently, the central working committee has a cabinet in which there are representatives from each village, age grade, Ndi-Nkwo-Ukwu and the youth. All these groups act as the legislators of the community. The age grades act as policemen and tax collectors. The Ndi Nkwo-Ukwu settle disputes, they also act as the judiciary. There is no separation of power because the three arms of government work hand in hand. Amawom is politically organized. In political matters, it is not autocratic rather it is democratic because people are allowed to air their views before a decision is taken. The people's reaction determines the type of decision to be taken. Decision making is by consensus. Whenever a decision is to be taken, the people and social groups are always consulted. Amawom Chiefs/Ezes don't have power like the Emirs of Northern Nigeria. If he makes a wrong policy, the people must oppose him.

== Socio-political structure ==
The 10 villages of Amawom intermarry. They also intermarry with other neighboring villages, because of this they settle their disputes amicably for being related by blood in one way or the other. Different social groups contribute to/with political leaders to administer their duties. But if they are looked down on, opposition arises, and it may lead to political instability. Kindreds visit and entertain their people during the New Yam and Ekpe festivals. Amawom also organizes traditional wrestling in which neighboring villages come to witness. Mbara Uru market is the social centre of Amawom and different social activities take place there.

== Schools ==
• Awom Na Ebo Secondary Technical School

• Amawom Community School

• Amawom Central School

== See also ==
• Umudike
