= Ogbuebulle =

Village in Abia State, Nigeria

Ogbuebulle Ogbuebulle Ala-Ala Oboro Autonomous Community
- Village
- Location of Ogbuebulle in Nigeria
- Coordinates: 5°22′6″N 7°34′0″E
- Country: Nigeria
- State: Abia State
- L.G.A: Ikwuano
- Clan: Oboro

Government
  - Type: Monarchy
  - Eze: HRM Eze Ezeji Uzu Analaba
- Elevation: 120 m (390 ft)

Population (2012)
  - Total: 170
  - Ethnicities: Igbo
  - Religion: Christianity
- Time zone: UTC+1 (WAT)
- 3-digit postal code prefix: 440109
- Area code: 440
- ISO 3166 code: NG.AB.IK
- Website: https://ng.geoview.info/ogbuebule,2327713

Ogbuebulle is a village in Oboro, Ikwuano Local Government Area, Abia State, Nigeria. The community is situated along the Umuahia-Ikot Ekpene Road. It is about 20km away from Umuahia, the capital of Abia State. Ogbuebulle is part of the Ala-Ala Oboro Autonomous Community alongside Ekebedi, its neighboring village.

== History ==
The forefathers of Ogbuebulle are believed to have migrated from Idima Abam to Oboroland. They settled at Amaoba, a fellow village in Oboro. During their stay there, a conflict emerged between them and the Amaoba people. Hence, the ancestors of Ogbuebulle left and settled in the land that is now known as Ogbuebulle.

== Culture ==
The New Yam festival, called "Afo Amaghi Onuma" (meaning; the stomach does not know when one is bereaved) is celebrated every October and the Ekpe festival is celebrated every January. These occasions attract seaming crowds from within and outside the community, even several tourists around the world.

== Religion ==
Several churches are in the community including the Methodist, Apostolic, Assemblies of God and a host of Pentecostal churches.

== Governance ==
The people are governed by a traditional ruler, the Eze of Ala-Ala Oboro, whose cabinet is made up of chiefs from the nine (9) villages in the community who act as representatives of their various villages.

== Hamlets ==
Ogbuebulle comprises nine sub-villages/kindreds:

- Abala
- Umuchukwu
- Umuoyi
- Ndi Ekpinma
- Umukpabi
- Ndi Nkporo
- Obodo
- Umuebulleukwu
- Obokporo

== Schools ==
- Ogbuebulle Central School

== See also ==
- Ndoro
