= Ahaba Oloko =

Village in Abia State, Nigeria

Ahaba Ahaba
- Village
- Location of Ahaba Oloko in Nigeria
- Coordinates: 5°22′46″N 7°32′44″E
- Country: Nigeria
- State: Abia State
- L.G.A: Ikwuano
- Clan: Oloko

Government
  - Type: Monarchy
  - Eze: HRH Eze Sir Charles Onorchie Ukattah KOC (Ahaba 2, of Isiala Ahaba) & HRM Eze Dr. Chimezie Nwabueze (Ahaba Ukwu)
- Elevation: 128 m (420 ft)

Population
  - Ethnicities: Igbo
  - Religion: Christianity
- Time zone: UTC+1 (WAT)
- 3-digit postal code prefix: 440111
- Area code: 440
- ISO 3166 code: NG.AB.IK
- Website: https://ng.geoview.info/ahaba,7073321

Ahaba is a rural community in Oloko, Ikwuano Local Government Area of Abia State, Nigeria. Isiala Ahaba and Ahaba Ukwu are the autonomous communities of Ahaba. Ahaba is 23 km south of Umuahia, Abia State's capital city.

== History ==
Ngwu, a headhunter from Ahaba Imenyi in present-day Isuikwuato LGA came to Ahaba for headhunting and eventually settled there, hence, the naming of Ahaba.

== Culture ==
The people of Ahaba, like other communities in Ikwuano, celebrate the popular Ekpe festival on January annually to mark the end of a farming season.

== See also ==
- Nchara
