= Itunta =

Village in Abia State, Nigeria

Itunta Itunta Umuakoo Autonomous Community
- Village
- Location of Itunta in Nigeria
- Coordinates: 5°26′57.77″N 7°38′10.9″E
- Country: Nigeria
- State: Abia State
- L.G.A: Ikwuano
- Clan: Ibere

Government
  - Type: Monarchy
  - Eze: HRM Eze Monday Unadindu Okoro
- Elevation: 38 m (125 ft)

Population
  - Ethnicities: Igbo
  - Religion: Christianity
- Time zone: UTC+1 (WAT)
- 3-digit postal code prefix: 440108
- Area code: 440
- ISO 3166 code: NG.AB.IK
- Website: https://ng.geoview.info/itunta,2336974

Itunta is a village in Ibere, Ikwuano Local Government Area, Abia State, Nigeria. Itunta falls under the Umuakoo Autonomous Community. The Eze of Umuakoo is HRM Eze Monday Unadindu Okoro in whom is conferred with the title of Akoo II of Umuakoo. Itunta is renowned for her vast cocoa production.

== Origin ==
The natives of Itunta are said to be part of the Itu diaspora, a dispersion of peoples of partial Itu(Ibibio) ancestry across Igboland. A notable community of Itu origin is Itumbauzo in Bende. Itu LGA in present-day Akwa Ibom State is the homeland of the Itu people.

== Culture ==
The people of Itunta mark the Inyang festival annually. They are the only community in Ikwuano who perform this event. It is quite distinct from the usual Ekpe festival in which every other Ikwuano community celebrates. Members of this community are mainly peasant farmers and deal mostly in rice and cocoa. Christianity is widely practiced. English and the Ibere dialect of Igbo are the languages spoken in Itunta.

== Economy ==
Itunta is situated in a cocoa-producing belt, hence, it is a major cocoa production site in Abia State. The community generates as much as 10 tons of cocoa yearly. They are also adept in plantain, rice, cassava and cucumber generation.

== Schools ==
- Itunta Community School

== See also ==
- Elemaga
