= Ekwelu =

Village in Abia State, Nigeria

Ekwelu Ekwelu Agumba Autonomous Community
- Village
- Location of Ekwelu in Nigeria
- Coordinates: 5.385°N 7.577°E
- Country: Nigeria
- State: Abia State
- L.G.A: Ikwuano
- Clan: Ariam/Usaka

Government
  - Type: Monarchy
  - Eze: HRH Joseph Obaji
- Elevation: 92 m (302 ft)

Population (2023)
  - Total: 2,000
  - Ethnicities: Igbo
  - Religion: Christianity
- Time zone: UTC+1 (WAT)
- 3-digit postal code prefix: 440110
- Area code: 440
- ISO 3166 code: NG.AB.IK
- Website: https://www.nigeriapostcode.com/abia-ikwuano-ariam-usaka-ekwelu.html

Ekwelu is a village in the Ariam/Usaka community of Ikwuano Local Government Area in Abia State, Nigeria. It belongs to the Agumba Autonomous Community. HRH Eze Joseph Obaji is the paramount ruler of Agumba. Ekwelu is 31 km south of Umuahia, the state capital and is situated along the Umuahia-Ikot Ekpene Federal Road.

== History ==
Ekwelu migrated from Abam along with Usaka and was regarded as the first son. They first settled at Usaka Ukwu before they migrated to their present abode. It is believed that some of their kinsmen still live in Usaka Ukwu till date. Ekwelu resisted the threat and intimidation of a popular hunter from Ibiono called Ere who wanted to dispossess them of their land. However, he failed in his quest to do so due to Ekwelu having great warlords who defeated him. Some of them being Okenyi, Amuru and Umele. These men were regarded as eminent warriors and founders of the land. Ekwelu shares a common boundary with Akwa Ibom State by a little market formerly called Ahia Orie Nwankwo but presently known as Ahia Unwarung. The market was a joint effort and was established for inter-communal relationship.

== Kindreds ==
The six kindreds of Ekwelu Kingdom are:

- Ndi Ama
- Ndi Ugbo
- Ndi Umele
- Ndi Odido
- Ndi Okenyi
- Ndi Njani

== Schools ==
- Ekwelu Community Primary School

== See also ==
- Ariam/Usaka
