= Eze (disambiguation) =

Eze is an Igbo word which means King. It may also refer to:

== People ==
=== Nickname ===
- Eazy-E (1964–1995), American rapper
- Eric Bischoff (born 1955), American professional wrestler

=== Surname ===
==== Footballers ====
- Dino Eze (born 1984), Nigerian footballer, mostly played for European clubs
- Eberechi Eze (born 1998), English footballer, plays for Arsenal and England
- Emeka Christian Eze (born 1992), Nigerian midfielder, plays for Al Masri and Nigeria
- Emeka Friday Eze (born 1996), Nigerian striker, plays for Pendikspor (Istanbul)
- Ndubuisi Eze (born 1984), Nigerian striker, mostly played for African clubs
- Patrick Friday Eze (born 1992), Nigerian footballer
- Stephen Eze (born 1994), Nigerian footballer

==== Others ====
- Chelsea Eze, Nigerian actress
- Chikezie Eze, (born 1985), American singer
- Emmanuel Chukwudi Eze, Nigerian-American philosopher
- Joy Eze (born 1988), Nigerian sprinter
- Justina Eze, Nigerian diplomat
- Uche Eze (born 1984), Nigerian blogger

== Other uses ==
- Èze, a commune in France
- Ezeigwe, the traditional ruler of Oguta, Nigeria
- Book of Ezekiel
- Eastern Airways, a British airline
- Ezeiza International Airport, IATA code for the Ezeiza, Buenos Aires, Argentina airport
- Zekwe language
