= Ngwaukwu =

Ngwa village-group in Abia State, Nigeria

Ngwaukwu (also spelled Ngwa Ukwu) is an Ngwa village-group in southeastern Nigeria. It is one of the major village-groups of Ngwaland and is traditionally associated with Ukwu, one of the founders of the early Ngwa settlement at Okpuala Ngwa.

== History ==
=== Origin and settlement ===
Ngwaukwu was named after Ukwu, who is identified in Ngwa tradition as the founder of Okpuala-Ngwa and head of the ancient Ngwa community. The settlement developed as the Ngwa population expanded from Okpuala-Ngwa into neighbouring areas.

Ngwaukwu originally comprised eight villages attributed to the sons of Ukwu. The number later increased to ten as the population of the settlement grew.

John Oriji's later list of village-groups in Ngwaland places Ngwaukwu first and identifies Okpuala-Ngwa as its capital. The village-group included Umuolike, Amaoji, Obikabia, Osusu, Amauzu, Ahiaba, Abayi, Amapu-Ngwa, Ihie and Umuchima.

=== Expansion ===
Ngwaukwu became a source of migration during the expansion of Ngwa settlement. The village-group of Ngwaukwu-Ugwunagbo was established during the southward expansion of the Ngwa, and most of its villages claimed Ngwaukwu ancestry.

Ahiaba-na-Abayi was likewise associated with Ngwaukwu. Its progenitors were traced to Ngwaukwu villages bearing the same names.

Migration from individual Ngwaukwu villages also contributed to the establishment of settlements elsewhere. Nwata, regarded as the progenitor of the Amavo settlement, was said to have migrated from Obikabia and later settled at Okpuala-Amavo.

Amauzu was founded by blacksmiths from an Ngwaukwu village of the same name.

== Traditional institutions ==
The Ezeala was an important traditional authority in Ngwaukwu. The Ezeala and other elders of the village-group prohibited the establishment of the Okonko society in the area.

== Colonial period ==
During the establishment of British colonial rule, Obikabia resisted the activities of the colonial administration. Court messengers sent to arrest people who had disobeyed warrant chiefs were chased away. British forces subsequently invaded Obikabia during the disturbances of 1914.
