= Nchara =

Community in Abia State, Nigeria

Nchara Nchara
- Village
- Location of Nchara in Nigeria
- Coordinates: 5°19′0″N 7°33′0″E
- Country: Nigeria
- State: Abia State
- L.G.A: Ikwuano
- Clan: Oloko

Government
  - Type: Monarchy
  - Eze: No Eze for now for (Afa Ukwu) & HRM Eze N. Hart Agunaegbe (JP) (Afa)
- Elevation: 99 m (325 ft)

Population (2015)
  - Total: 20,000
  - Ethnicities: Igbo
  - Religion: Christianity
- Time zone: UTC+1 (WAT)
- 3-digit postal code prefix: 440111
- Area code: 440
- ISO 3166 code: NG.AB.IK
- Website: https://ng.geoview.info/akanunchara,2351194 https://ng.geoview.info/otoro_nchara,501405868n

Nchara is an agrarian community in Oloko, Ikwuano Local Government Area, Abia State, Nigeria. It is composed of two sister villages; Akanu and Etoruo (formerly Otoro). These two villages are placed under two autonomous communities - Afa Ukwu & Afa respectively. It is about 24 km away from the state capital, Umuahia.

== Economy and infrastructure ==
Being an agricultural hub, Nchara has been an economically important region to Ikwuano. The soil of Nchara is fertile for the cultivation of commercial crops such as yams, cassava, plantains and even common fruits like bananas, oranges and watermelons. Farmers from Nchara sell their produce in neighboring villages such as Ndoro, Ariam and to their Annang neighbors in Akwa Ibom State. Their agricultural prowess has made them buoyant enough to feed themselves. Despite this, Nchara's development is plodding.

== See also ==
• Aba Women's Riot
