= Oloko =

Clan in Abia State, Nigeria

Oloko Ndi Oloko
Total population
- <100,000

Languages
- Oloko Igbo, English, Nigerian Pidgin

Religion
- Christianity

Related ethnic groups
- Ariam/Usaka, Ngwa, Annang, Nkari, Abam

Oloko is one of the four clans that make up Ikwuano Local Government Area of Abia State, Nigeria. Oloko is from the Isuogu group. It borders Oboro to the north, Olokoro and Ngwa to the west, Ariam/Usaka to the east and Ikono; a clan in Akwa Ibom State to its south. Oloko is one of 18 Igbo clans of the Old Bende Division. It was classified in the Ohuhu-Ngwa cluster of the Southern Igbo area.

== Origin ==
Oloko was originally known as Afa. The settlers at Oloko came from Abam and settled at Ihu-Uro; a site between Oloko village and Amizi. It was from there that they moved westward and south-west driving away the Annang of Otoro and Nkari. Subsequently, they established the ten villages of Ahaba, Oloko, Akanu Nchara, Etoruo Nchara, Awomukwu, Umugo, Azuiyi, Amizi, Obuohia Okike and Usaka Eleogu. The conquerors retained the names of the villages they conquered. This accounts for the phonetic similarities of names of many Ikwuano and Annang villages.

== Culture ==
The people of Oloko celebrate the Ekpe and Iri Ji (New Yam) festivals. They speak the Oloko dialect of the Igbo language. Generally, their cultural elements are similar to other Igbo groups as they speak a common language, dress like them and eat similar delicacies.

== Women's War ==
An incident at Oloko started the Women's War in 1929. This arose from fears that a new taxation scheme would impose taxes on women, particularly widows, which they had no previously been expected to pay. When the widow Nwanyereuwa was approached by a tax inspector she immediately refused to co-operate, and went into Oloko Town, where a women's meeting was in progress discussing the issue. The meeting then started to mobilise resistance to the new taxes. Three women active in this campaign, Ikonnia, Nwannedia and Nwugo, became known as the Oloko Trio.

== See also ==
• Aba Women's Riot
