= Abam =

Clan in Abia state, Nigeria

Abam is a populated Igbo clan in Abia state. It is located in Arochukwu/Ohafia federal constituency of Nigeria. Abam is the biggest clan by population and landmass in Arochukwu LGA, and one of the biggest clan in Abia North senatorial district.

Abam is a brother clan to Ohafia, as both Abam and Ohafia share a common ancestry, culture, dialect etc. The progenitor of the people of Abam is known as Onyerubi Atita. As a people, Abam clan in Abia state is sometimes referred to as Abam Onyerubi.

Historically, Abam people were fierce and dreaded warriors. They gloried in war conquests, and participated much in mercenary and military policing duties across Eastern Nigeria. They were contracted across Igboland and beyond for defence purposes, on behalf of communities that were under oppression or annihilation from their neighbouring or far away enemies. Abam warriors were the pioneers of the popular Ikpirikpi Ogu, also known as Abam War Dance, that was adapted by the Ohafia clan as Ohafia War Dance and to Abiriba clan as Abiriba War Dance. Abam was not alone in having a sophisticated military culture. Other clans around Abam also developed this culture just like the Abam. Clans like Ohafia, Abiriba, Edda, Alayi, Igbere, Ututu etc. also developed this warrior culture and they all, including Abam built a regional military power bloc that the whole of Igbo land dreaded. Sometimes, these power bloc of warrior clans were utilised and exploited by the Aro people for their own Aro territorial expeditions across Southern Nigeria. It is speculated that without the Abam warriors and other neighbouring Warrior clans like the Abam, that there would have not been an Aro confederecy. Abam people were not just warriors, but were also hardworking farmers and traders.

Abam has a large expanse of fertile land, which makes it a food basket of Abia State. With Palm plantations, Rubber Plantations, Rice paddies, Cassava farms, Cocoa plantations, and others, covering much of the landscape. It is a place with so much peace and hospitality to its indigenes and visitors alike. Its sons and daughters, doing exploits across the globe.

== Communities in Abam ==
Abam in Abia state is made up of 27 villages. Which are:

- Ndiebe Abam
- Ozu Abam
- Idima Abam
- Amaeke Abam
- Ndi-Oji Abam
- Amelu Abam
- Amuru Abam
- Amaogbu Abam
- Atan Abam
- Ndi-Okereke Abam
- Ndi-Oji-Ugwo Abam
- Ndi-Ememe Abam
- Ndi-Agwu Abam
- Ahuma Abam
- Eziafor Abam
- Ndi-Okorie Abam
- Ndi-Okwara Abam
- Ndi-Ebelagu Abam
- Ndiya Abam
- Oduenyi Abam
- Itum Abam
- Ndi-Agwu Abam
- Ndi Ebelagu Abam
- Ndi-Ibom Abam
- Ndi-Ite Abam
- Ndi-Nsi Abam
- Ugwu-Aduenyi Abam

== Migratory Descendants ==
There are other communities, towns and clans in other parts of Eastern Nigeria, that trace their ancestry to Abam, largely due to the resettlements of these Abam people to those areas, after their war exploits, or mercenary services, or farm land expansions there. Some of them are:

- Umuhu Town in Bende LGA of Abia State.
- Ndoro community in Oboro, Ikwuano LGA of Abia State.
- Ogbuegbulle community in Oboro, Ikwuano LGA of Abia State.
- Amaoba Ime community in Oboro, Ikwuano LGA of Abia State.
- Amaoba Ikuputu community in Oboro, Ikwuano LGA of Abia State.
- Ariam/Usaka clan in Ikwuano LGA of Abia State.
- Oloko clan in Ikwuano LGA of Abia State.
- Umuana Ndume community in Ibeku, Umuahia North LGA of Abia State.
- Lodu Ndume community in Ibeku, Umuahia North LGA of Abia State.
- Abam community in Ubakala, Umuahia South LGA of Abia State.
- Abba clan in Imo State.
- Osuh clan in Imo state (Anara Town in Isiala Mbano LGA of Imo state, Eziama Obiato Community in Mbaitoli LGA of Imo state, and other Osuh clan communities)
- Abam community in Azia, Ihiala LGA of Anambra State.
- Abam-Ama, Okrika LGA of Rivers State, and many others.
