= Anara, Nigeria =

Town in Imo State, Nigeria

Anara is a town in Isiala Mbano, Imo State, Nigeria. It is located about 30 km (20 mi) northeast of Owerri, and is bordered by Amaraku, Eziama and Abba amongst other communities. It originated as a settlement made up of eight villages, with Aguna being the oldest of them. Anara's population stands at around 70,000 inhabitants and is experiencing growth owing to a recent surge in immigration. The town celebrates many festivities, including Anara Day, the Awa festival, and the New Yam festival.

== Origin ==
Anara is a member of the Osuh (Osuh Ama) clan, regarded to as a brother to the Abba clan. The ancestors of both of the clans agreed to originally come from Abam, an Igbo group affiliated with the Aros.
