= Federal College of Agriculture, Ishiagu =

Agricultural school in Ishiagu, Nigeria

- Type: Public
- Accreditation: National Board for Technical Education
- Location: Ishiagu, Ebonyi State, Nigeria
- Website: https://fcaishiagu.edu.ng/

The Federal College of Agriculture, Ishiagu (popularly known as "FCA Ishiagu") is based in Ishiagu, Ivo Local government area of Ebonyi State, Nigeria. The college promotes education, training and research into agricultural production, processing and technology.

== History ==
The college which was established in Umudike in 1955 by the government of Eastern Nigeria, was amalgamated with the Agricultural Research Station, Umudike in 1964 and was taken over by the East Central State Government in 1970. In 1972, the Federal Government took over the college as part of the Federal Agricultural Research and Training Station (FARTS), and in 1976 the school became the training wing of the National Root Crops Research Institute, Umudike. The National Board for Technical Education accredited the college programs in 1989, and again in 1993. The college was relocated to its current site in 1995. As a "Village Agricultural Improvement Project" for 15 communities in the Olokoro Clan, the facility itself had been established in 1964..↵

== Courses ==
Federal College of Agriculture Ishiagu, was only awarding National Diplomas(ND) but have recently upgraded to the award of Higher National Diplomas(HND). The following programmes are run by the institution at the National Diploma level and Higher Diploma level;

=== National diploma ===
- Science Laboratory Technology
- Fisheries Technology
- Home and Rural Economics
- Agricultural Technology
- Agricultural and Bio-Environmental Engineering Technology
- Business Administration and Management
- Accountancy
- Marketing
- Public Administration
- Horticultural Technology
- Statistics
- Animal Health and Production Technology
- Co-operative Economics and Management
- Environmental Management Technology

=== Higher national diploma ===
These are programmes for the award of Higher National Diploma;

- Animal Production Technology
- Crop Production Technology
- Agricultural Extension and Management
- Pest Management Technology
- Horticulture and Landscape Technology
- Fisheries Technology
- Computer Science Technology
- Home and Rural Economics
- Agricultural and Environmental Engineering Technology (Farm Power and Machinery option)
- Cooperative Economics and Management
- Statistics

== See also ==
- List of polytechnics in Nigeria
