= Awomukwu =

Village in Abia State, Nigeria

Awomukwu Awomukwu Awomukwu Autonomous Community
- Village
- Location of Awomukwu in Nigeria
- Coordinates: 5.38463°N 7.57674°E
- Country: Nigeria
- State: Abia State
- L.G.A: Ikwuano
- Clan: Oloko

Government
  - Type: Monarchy
  - Eze: Vacant
- Elevation: 99 m (325 ft)

Population
  - Ethnicities: Igbo
  - Religion: Christianity
- Time zone: UTC+1 (WAT)
- 3-digit postal code prefix: 440111
- Area code: 440
- ISO 3166 code: NG.AB.IK
- Website: https://nigeriapostal.com/postcode/NG-Abia/440111/Awomukwu

Awomukwu is a village in Oloko, Ikwuano Local Government Area, Abia State, Nigeria. It is located along the Umuahia-Ikot Ekpene Road.

== 3 Ancestral Traditional Villages ==
- Umusoko
- Umualo
- Amapu

== 17 Villages ==
- Ndiako
- Ndimba
- Amangwo
- Obeachara
- Umuamaji
- Eleke
- Isiama
- Alaocha
- Azuahia
- Umuakaka
- Uzoawom
- Obeofuo
- Umugo
- Umuokenwa
- Otubeukwu
- Umuoriaku
- Ndinkwo

== Schools ==
- Awomukwu Central School
- Awomukwu Community School

== Hospitals ==
- Awomukwu Health Centre

== See also ==
- List of villages in Abia State
