= Ariam Ala-Ala =

Village in Abia State, Nigeria

Ariam Ala-Ala Ariam Ala-Ala Autonomous Community
- Village
- Nickname: Ariam
- Ariam Ala-Ala
- Coordinates: 5°21′0″N 7°37′0″E
- Country: Nigeria
- State: Abia State
- L.G.A: Ikwuano
- Clan: Ariam/Usaka

Government
  - Type: Monarchy
  - Eze: HRM Eze Onyekwere Onwualimba
- Elevation: 72 m (236 ft)

Population
  - Ethnicities: Igbo
  - Religion: Christianity
- Time zone: UTC+1 (WAT)
- 3-digit postal code prefix: 440110
- Area code: 440
- ISO 3166 code: NG.AB.IK
- Website: https://ng.geoview.info/alalaariam,2350611

Ariam Ala-Ala is a village in Ikwuano Local Government Area of Abia State, Nigeria. It is one of 15 localities of the Ariam/Usaka clan. The community is located along the Umuahia-Ikot Ekpene Road and is about 27 km away from the state capital, Umuahia.

== History ==
Ariam Ala-Ala is said to be the place where the Ariam people first settled after ejecting the former Annang occupants.

== Schools ==
- Ariam Ala Ala Migrant Primary School
- Ikwuano Secondary School, Ariam

== See also ==
- Ariam/Usaka
