= Ndiebe Abam =

Community in Nigeria

Ndiebe Abam is a community in Arochukwu Local Government Area of Abia State, Nigeria. It is one of over 20 communities in Abam Clan.

It is bordered by Ozu Abam, Ndi Ojugwo Abam, Amaeke Abam, Amuru Abam, Umuhu and Amanta Abriba. It is among the five biggest communities in Abam Clan, blessed with a massive land mass, a beautiful landscape and a thriving population.

Historically, the people were warriors and farmers. Later some became Civil Servants, Merchants, Academicians and Politicians.

Many rivers, streams and springs cross the area. Igwu River empties into the Atlantic Ocean through Akwa Ibom, and flows through Ndiebe Abam.

The area features favourable weather and fertile soil, yielding bountiful agricultural produce. The most notable agricultural produce are Cassava, Oil Palm, and Rice.
