= Ebieri Jones =

Nigerian politician

Dr. Ebieri Jones

Commissioner for Trade, Industry and Investment, Bayelsa State
- In office 2024–incumbent
- Governor: Douye Diri

Personal details
- Party: Peoples Democratic Party
- Education: Ph.D. in Accounting
- Occupation: Public administrator, academic

Ebieri Jones is a Nigerian Politician who currently serves as the Commissioner for Trade, Industry & Investment in Bayelsa State. He was appointed by Governor Douye Diri.

== Early life and education ==
Jones holds a Ph.D. in Accounting. Before his appointment to the Bayelsa State Executive Council, he lectured in the Department of Accounting at the College of Management Sciences, Michael Okpara University of Agriculture, Umudike, Abia State, Nigeria.

== Political career ==
Ebieri is the Commissioner for Trade, Industry & Investment in Bayelsa State under Governor Douye Diri. He was confirmed as a commissioner by the Bayelsa State House of Assembly in 2024.

Previously, he served as Commissioner for Mineral Resources before being reassigned to his current portfolio in 2024 as part of a cabinet reshuffle.
