= Ubakala =

Town in Abia State, Nigeria

Ubakala is a large town in Umuahia South Local Government Area (LGA) of Abia State, Nigeria. It is one of the major ancient clans of Umuahia. A popular market for which it is known is the Apumiri Market. Umuahia South Local Government Area Headquarters is located at Apumiri as well. Ubakala is situated southwards of Umuahia main township. Its well defined boundaries geographically places it at the North of Ntigha (a community in Isiala-Ngwa LGA).

== Religion ==
In ancient times, Ubakala people were Animists whose cultural and religious practices bore interesting similarities to Judaism as seen also in every other Igbo community. Ubakala people once adhered to a deity called 'Nkpata', invoked by the long juju (Ibini Ukpabi) priests from Arochukwu, as well as lesser deities like the Njoku Ji. The Ekpe secret society (Okonko) was quite prominent during those times. A masquerade festival called "Abu Nkwu" took place on occasional basis. Ubakala believed in reincarnation and ancestor honor as part of their worldview.

Today, Ubakala people are predominantly Protestant Christians. Denominations like Anglicanism, Presbyterianism, Adventist Movements, Qua Iboe Churches, Assemblies of God Churches amongst others are conspicuous. Catholicism has some degree of foothold in Ubakala as well.

== Social structure ==
Ubakala people are generally modest, religious, and industrious. Their dance-plays are well documented in contemporary anthropology and the Oxford's International Encyclopedia of Dance. Ubakala is a patrilineal, egalitarian and achievement oriented clan. Once led by constitutional monarchs who bore the now defunct 'Uba of Ubakala' title, Ubakala has evolved into conglomerates of thirteen viable villages, each one presided over by an instituted Eze with his council of elders/chiefs. Before British colonialism, Ubakala was one of several clans in igboland that, as a matter of principle, didn't practice the Osu caste system (not to be misconstrued for the "osu" homonym associated with greatness in the igbo lexicon) despite its legality and presence in ancient Igbo socio-cultural practice.

The 13 villages of Ubakala which now have the status of Autonomous Communities are:

- Nsukwe
- Amibo
- Umuogo
- Amuzu
- Eziama
- Mgbarakuma
- Umuosu
- Avodim
- Laguru
- Abam
- Nsirimo
- Ipupe
- Umuako
