= Ashley Nwosu =

Nollywood actor (1954–2011)

Ashley Chijioke Nwosu
- Born: Ashley Chijioke Nwosu; 21 December 1954; Abia State, Nigeria
- Died: 21 April 2011 (aged 56)
- Education: University of Nigeria, Nsukka
- Occupation: Actor
- Years active: 21 December 1957 – 21 April 2011

Ashley Chijioke Nwosu (24 December 1954 – 21 April 2011) was a Nigerian actor. He was born on the 21st of November 1954 in Abia State, Umuigu Oboro in present-day Ikwuano Local Government Area in the southeastern region of Nigeria and he died on 21 April 2011 at a Military Hospital at Yaba, Lagos State, in the western region of Nigeria. He attended Umuigu Central Primary School in Ikwuano, Abia State where he got his First School Leaving Certificate. He proceeded to Oboro Secondary School at Ikwuano, Abia State where he got his West African Senior School Certificate.

He later gained admission into the University of Nigeria, Nsukka at Enugu State where he graduated with a bachelor's degree in Zoology.

== Filmography ==
- A Man for Brenda
- I Need My Husband (1994) as Chief Odobo
- Full Moon (1998) as Pastor
- Aba Riot (1999)
- She Devil (2001) as Richard's Father
- Kids are Angry (2001) as Papa
- Power of Love part 1 & 2 (2002) - as Mr. Gideon
- Aristos (2003) - as Mike
- Emotional Tears (2003) as Chief Ojimba
- Home Sickness (2004) - as Richard
- Burning Heart (2004) as Howard
- Baby Guards (2005)
- Tears of Nancy (2005) - as Ben
- Crying Angel (2005) - as Chike
- Hidden Secrets (2006)
- Keeping Close (2006) - as Odunze
- Young Masters (2006)
- Genevieve (2007)
- Stone Love (2007)
- Save a Soul (2007) as Mr. Smith
- Twist of Fate (2007) as Ambassador
- Temple of Justice (2008)
- Wrong Desire (2008)
- Bless My Soul (2008) - as Mr. Echem
- Distance Between (2008) - as Mr. Taylor
- Nigerian Girls (2009)
- Okoto the Messenger (2011) - as Mr. Chukwuma
