= Isiala Oboro =

Village in Abia State, Nigeria

Isiala Oboro Isiala Isiama Oboro Autonomous Community
- Village
- Location of Isiala Oboro in Nigeria
- Coordinates: 5°24′15″N 7°34′06″E
- Country: Nigeria
- State: Abia State
- L.G.A: Ikwuano
- Clan: Oboro

Government
  - Type: Monarchy
  - Eze: HRH Eze Prof. Sunday Ezeribe

Area
  - Total: 0.9 km^{2} (0.35 sq mi)
- Elevation: 152 m (499 ft)

Population (2015)
  - Total: 682
  - Density: 7,642/km^{2} (19,790/sq mi)
  - Ethnicities: Igbo
  - Religion: Christianity
- Time zone: UTC+1 (WAT)
- 3-digit postal code prefix: 440109
- Area code: 440
- ISO 3166 code: NG.AB.IK
- National language: Igbo
- Website: https://ng.geoview.info/mbiopong,2330326

Isiala Oboro Mkpọpụta(formerly known as Mbiopong) is a village in the Oboro community of Ikwuano Local Government Area of Abia State, Nigeria. It is the headquarters of Ikwuano LGA. Isiama Oboro is the autonomous community of Isiala. The traditional head of Isiama Oboro is HRH Prof. Eze Sunday Ezeribe. He is conferred with the title of Isioha II of Isiama.

== See also ==
• Elemaga
