= Okpuala Ngwa =

Headquarters of Isiala-Ngwa North

Coordinates: 5°23′19″N 7°26′38″E

Okpuala Ngwa is a town in Isiala-Ngwa North. It serves as the administrative headquarters for the local government. It was the first settlement and headquarters of the Ngwa people. The people of Okpuala Ngwa speak the Ngwa dialect of the Ngwa people.

== Climate ==
The rainy season in Okpuala-Ngwa is humid, oppressive, and cloudy, while the dry season is warm, muggy, and largely gloomy. The average annual temperature ranges from 19 °C (67 °F) to 31 °C (87 °F), rarely falling below 16 °C (60 °F) or rising over 32 °C (90 °F).

Because Okpuala-Ngwa experiences such small seasonal temperature variations, talking about hot and cold seasons isn't very helpful.

=== Clouds ===
The average proportion of sky covered by clouds in Okpuala-Ngwa varies significantly seasonally throughout the year.

Around November 24 marks the start of Okpuala-Ngwa's clearer season, which lasts for 2.6 months and ends around February 11.

In Okpuala-Ngwa, December is the clearest month of the year, with a 41% average percentage of clear, mostly clear, or partly overcast skies.

Beginning about February 11 and lasting for 9.4 months, the cloudier period of the year ends around November 24.

In Okpuala-Ngwa, April is the month with the most clouds, with the sky being overcast or mostly cloudy 87% of the time.

=== Precipitation ===
A day that has at least 0.04 inches of liquid or liquid-equivalent precipitation is considered to be wet. In Okpuala-Ngwa, the likelihood of rainy days varies wildly throughout the year.

From March 25 to November 10, the wetter season, which lasts 7.5 months, has a greater than 45% chance of precipitation on any given day. In Okpuala-Ngwa, September has an average of 25.4 days with at least 1.0 millimetre (0.04 inches) of precipitation, making it the month with the most wet days.

Between November 10 and March 25, or 4.5 months, is the dry season. January has an average of 1.7 days with at least 1.0 millimetre (0.04 inches) of precipitation, making it the month with the fewest wet days in Okpuala-Ngwa.
