= Apumiri =

Local government council headquarters located in Ubakala, Nigeria

Coordinates: 5°30′42″N 7°26′58″E

Apumiri, located in Ubakala, is the local government council headquarters of Umuahia South Local Government Area of Abia State in Nigeria.

It used to be the marketsquare of Ubakala people in pre-colonial times. After the emergence of the colonially established agricultural center located at Ibeku area, Apumiri's market in Ubakala gradually waned, probably because of its proximity to the larger Ibeku considered by the British colonialists.
