= Ishiagu =

Town in Ebonyi state

Coordinates: 5°56′55″N 7°34′00″E

Ishiagu is a town in the Ivo Local Government Area in Ebonyi State, Nigeria, located on the plains of the south-eastern savannah belt. It is the location of the Federal College of Agriculture, Ishiagu. An open-pit lead/zinc mine was opened in 1965, and closed 17 years later. Oil spill and oil pipeline vandalism in the area has caused significant environmental damage.

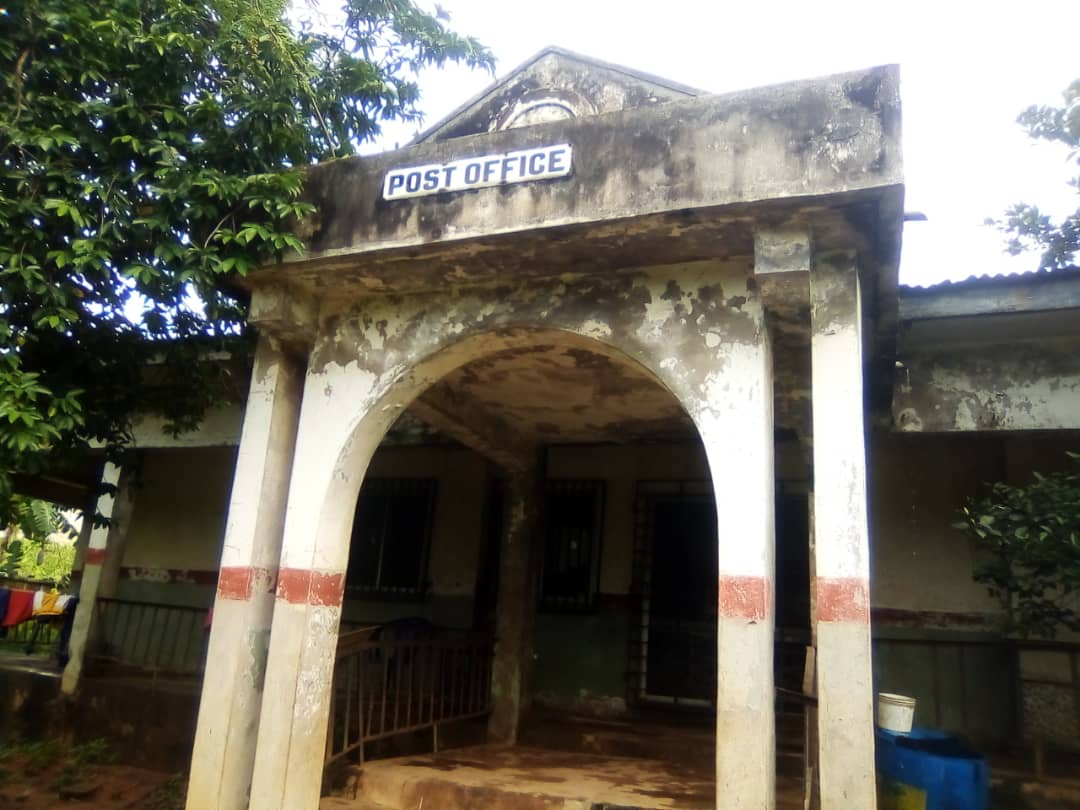
Ishiagu Post office
