= Ariam/Usaka =

Clan in Abia State, Nigeria

Ariam/Usaka Umu Ariam
Total population
- <100,000

Languages
- Ariam Igbo, English, Nigerian Pidgin

Religion
- Christianity

Related ethnic groups
- Oloko, Abam, Ngwa, Nkari, Annang, Ibibio

Ariam/Usaka is one of the four principal clans of Ikwuano Local Government Area, Abia State, Nigeria. Ariam/Usaka belongs to the Isuogu family. Ariam itself is made up of three subgroups namely; Ariam, Ekpiri and Usaka. This clan borders Ibere and Oboro to the north, Oloko to the west, as well as several Ibibio communities in Akwa Ibom State to its eastern and southern borders. Forde and Jones categorized the Isuogu family (Ariam/Usaka and Oloko) in the Ohuhu-Ngwa cluster of the Southern Igbo area.

== Origin ==
Ariam migrated from Ugwuala in Abam and Usaka from Ora Obara also in Abam. The first settler in Ekpiri was called Onyeike Ukwumbe from Ubaha in Nsulu Ngwa (popularly called Umu Osaji) in the Old Aba Province. They drove away the Annang inhabitants and settled at Ariam Ala-Ala. Later, the scarcity of land made them warriors who drove the Annang group further southwest to Nto Ndang and Ita Ikpo. The new settlement was named Ariam Elu-Elu.

== Culture ==
The Ariam people celebrate the Ekpe festival; an event marked by the other three groups in Ikwuano. Local wrestling tournaments are also organized. They speak the Igbo language but have their own dialect.

== Villages ==
Ariam/Usaka is made up of 15 villages namely;

• Amaegbu

• Ariam Ala-Ala

• Ariam Elu-Elu

• Azunchai

• Ekpiri Ala-Ala

• Ekpiri Elu-Elu

• Ekwelu

• Ndieke

• Ndiokoro

• Ndiorie

• Obugwu

• Obeama

• Oboni

• Upa

• Usaka Ukwu

== Boundary disputes with neighboring Akwa Ibom communities ==
Over the years, the Ariam/Usaka community has continuously been involved in bloody boundary skirmishes with her Akwa Ibom neighbors. For instance, in February 2021, as many as 16 people were reportedly killed, with six others missing in Usaka Ukwu, Azunchai, Ekpiri Ala-Ala and Ariam Elu-Elu and among their Nkari and Obot Akara neighbors in Ini and Obot Akara LGAs of Akwa Ibom State respectively. Other communities affected by the boundary clash were Oboni, Upa, Ndiorie, Obugwu and Ekwelu.

== See also ==
• Oloko
