= Augustine Ukattah =

Nigerian teacher and politician

Augustine Ukattah (August 28, 1918 – January 27, 1996) was a Nigerian teacher and politician.

== Early life ==
Augustine Echewodor Ukattah was born at Ahaba-Oloko in the Ikwuano Local Government Area of Abia State, Nigeria, on August 28, 1918. Ukattah was the fourth son of the Ukattah Nkor Abajuo family and Ejighiato Nwamgbede Ukattah, both of Ahaba-Oloko. His father died when he was very young and he had to grow up under his uncle, Chief Mathew Ugoani. He attended Christ the King Primary School in Aba and St. Theresa's School in Okigwe. After a brief spell as a Pupil Teacher, he entered the prestigious St. Charles Teacher Training College in Onitsha, in 1941. He qualified as a Higher Elementary Teacher in 1944 and passed the Senior Teachers' Examination in History in 1948.

== Career ==
After he left St. Charles Teacher Training College in 1944, he was sent to Holy Cross School, Uturu – Isuikwuato, in 1946, as a Certificated Teacher, for his first teaching assignment. From 1946 to 1950, he was the Headmaster of St. Patrick's School Ogudu-Asaa in Isuikwuato. In 1951, following his outstanding record at St. Patrick's School, he was posted to head St. Bernard's School, Okigwe. He was later sent to Umuahia, in 1952, as the headmaster of St. Michael's Township School, known then for outstanding results in both academia and sports. He headed St. Michael's Township School, from 1952 to 1959. Between 1960 and 1962, he became the Catholic Mission Inspector General of Education. In 1963, he became Assistant Superintendent of Schools, a position he held until the end of Nigeria Civil War. He retired from active service in 1973.

While he was the headmaster of St. Michael's Township School, he was also active in politics and became secretary of the National Council of Nigeria and the Cameroons — the popular political party among Eastern Nigerians at the time. He was elected member of the Federal House of Representatives for Bende Division from 1954 to 1959 and then became a Senator in the upper house of the National Assembly representing Umuahia Province. In 1961, Chief Ukattah acted as Senate President of Nigeria, holding brief for Barrister, Dennis Osadebay. He was appointed leader of a high-powered Nigerian delegation to the Republic of Mexico via the United States in 1963 by then Prime Minister of Nigeria, Abubakar Tafawa Balewa, when he, as leader of the delegation, was privileged to have addressed a joint session of the Senate and of the Deputies of the Republic of Mexico. On return, he authored a book titled; "My Trip to Mexico". He also served for many years as a member of the Bende Native Authority, and Bende County Council. He was equally, first chairman of the defunct Ikwuano County Council, now known as Ikwuano Local Government Area of Abia State, and for many years, President of both Ikwuano and Oloko Clan Unions.

== Later life and death ==
In the late fifties, he sponsored the education of his youngest brother Ferdinand I. E. Ukattah in Great Britain, where he qualified as a barrister and solicitor in 1960 and was the first Ikwuano and Umuahia indigene to qualify as a lawyer and later, the Chief Judge of Imo and Abia States, of Nigeria.

In 1976 he received a Knighthood of the Order of St. Gregory, from Pope Paul VI. Also, in 1977, he became a Knight of St. Mulumba and until his death in 1996, he was the Grand Knight of the Order of St. Mulumba in Umuahia Catholic Diocese. In 1991, he was appointed a Justice of the Peace by the State Government.
