= Atiwurcha Sylvanus =

Nigerian politician (born 1968)

Atiwurcha Sylvanus (Albert Sylvanus Atiwurcha) is a Nigerian politician. He has represented Gombi/Hong Federal Constituency in the Federal House of Representatives.

== Early life and education ==
Atiwurcha Sylvanus was born in June 1968. He is a native of Ikwuano in Abia State, Nigeria. He obtained a degree in Pharmarcy from A.B.U. Zaria. He is a Pharmacist and politician.

== Political career ==
Albert Sylvanus was elected to the House of Representatives in 2003, representing Gombi/Hong Federal Constituency under the People’s Democratic Party (PDP).
