= Ndi Oji Abam =

Ndi Oji Abam Ndi Oji Abam Autonomous Community
- City
- Location of Ndi Oji Abam in Nigeria
- Coordinates: 5°29′56.9″N 7°47′17.88″E
- Country: Nigeria
- State: Abia State
- L.G.A: Arochukwu
- Clan: Abam

Government
  - Type: Monarchy (One of the few kingdoms in Nigeria, which practices the monarchical system of government)
  - Traditional Ruler: HRM Eze Orji Ojembe (JP)

Area
  - Total: 132 km^{2} (51 sq mi)

Population
  - Ethnicities: Igbo Ibibio Akpa
  - Religions: Christianity Traditional religions
- 3-digit postal code prefix: 442105
- ISO 3166 code: NG.AB.AR
- Website: http://ng.geoview.info/ndioji,2329240

Ndi Oji Abam is a town in Arochukwu local government area, Abia State, Nigeria. The town has an area of 132 square kilometres (51 mi^{2}; 33,000 acres).
