= Buchi Atuonwu =

- Born: Buchi Atuonwu; 24 June 1964 (age 62); Kaduna, Nigeria
- Origin: Ikwuano, Abia State, Nigeria
- Genres: Gospel; Reggae music
- Occupations: Singer; Songwriter; Reggae Artist; Poet
- Labels: Loveworld Records; BIG TOONZ
- Spouse: Jane Atuonwu

Buchi Atuonwu (born 24 June 1964), better known as Buchi, is a Nigerian songwriter, author, poet, spoken words and reggae gospel artist. He started as a disc jockey in night clubs.

Buchi is part of Christ Embassy's LoveWorld Music and Arts Ministry.

== Early life and education ==
Buchi is a native of Abia state south-east Nigeria, but was born in Kaduna on 24 June 1964.

Education

He attended Methodist College Uzuakoli and Federal Government College, Enugu both in south-east Nigeria. Upon completion of his secondary school, Buchi gained admission to the University of Lagos in 1983 where he obtained a bachelor's degree in English Language and Literary Studies in three years. By 1988, he obtained a second degree and took up an appointment to lecture at the same institution while studying for his Ph.D.

Buchi continued in the University of Lagos as a lecturer until 1994 when he began actively writing literature, poetry and music.

Black Activism

During his stay at the university, Buchi's developed interest in black activism via a reggae club, and it progressively increased through the years. This evolution was prompted by his exposure to ideologies during a presentation by Oliver Thambo and representatives of the African National Congress (ANC) from South Africa during the club's enlightening exhibition centered on the theme of "Apartheid in South Africa". This contributed to his exploration of literature authored by prominent black activists such as Dennis Bruts, Wole Soyinka and Muta Baruka, and it contributed to Buchi's connection with reggae music. This connection was rooted in the perception of reggae as a medium to articulate opposition against oppression. This led him to join one of the campus confraternities, which, during that period, positioned themselves as proponents of anti-oppression initiatives.

== Music ==
1999 was his breakout year. Buchi began his musical career as a Disc Jockey at an 80s popular Night Club called Floating Bukka, which was in a docked vessel at the Marina, Lagos Island. He was invited to join the gig by Ras Kimono.

== Personal life ==
He has lived most of his life in Lagos. He is married to Jane Atuonwu. He has four children all of which have featured on his musical project at various times. He released a song 'Normally' on his 8th Album titled, 'Normally' which featured all his children. Buchi's past has helped to set his present in motion. He was a lecturer in UNILAG during the day and was a DJ at night. He is still pursuing a Doctorate Degree in Semantics and Social Linguistics at Unilag. buchi became a Christian in 1992 he used to be a smoker but the last time he smoked was 30 December 1992 after he gave his life to Christ.

== Albums ==
Buchi has released 8 Studio albums and two books. The audio albums are as follows:

- 1999 - These Days
- 2002 - So Beatutiful
- 2005 - What A Life
- 2008 - Sounds Of Life
- 2011 - Judah
- 2014 - I See
- 2017 - Red, Gold & Green
- 2020 - 11:59

== Books ==
- Cease Fire: The book is about Campus cultism which he was involved in during his university days.
- My Weed and I
