= Ezeigwe =

The Ezeigwe, which means "chief of the sky," is the traditional paramount ruler of Oguta. The word derives from Eze, meaning chief in the Igbo language. He governs through a council of ministers called Oririnzere, chief of which is the Ogana or the Speaker.

The Oguta kingdom was established in a like manner to the Benin Kingdom of Nigeria. Many people in Oguta believe that the Oguta people migrated from the ancient Benin Kingdom. They argue that the administrative set up, titles and common names have similarities to those of the Bini people. Although the people of Oguta do not call their king Oba as the Bini do, both kingdoms have some striking parallels.
