= Nsirimo =

Nsirimo is a village in Umuahia South Local Government, Abia State, Nigeria.

It is made up of five village units namely Umuako, Umumba, Umuaha, Umuezu and Umuerim.

It has a Central market at Orie-Ama. It is very close to Apumiri, the headquarters of Umuahia South Local Government Area. It is also close to Apumiri Market, one of the largest market in Umuahia.

== External link ==
Online platform on Facebook
