= Ngwa dialect =

Language for Ngwa people

Ngwa
- Ásụ̀sụ́ Ṅgwà
- Pronunciation: [ŋɡʷa]
- Native to: Ngwa
- Region: Southeastern Nigeria
- Ethnicity: Ngwa people
- Native speakers: (1.8 million cited 1979)
- Language family: Niger–Congo?: Atlantic–Congo; Volta–Congo; Volta–Niger; Igboid; Nuclear Igboid; Igbo; Ngwa
- Dialects: Abala-Ibeme
- Writing system: Latin (Önwu alphabet); Nwagu Aneke script Igbo Braille

Official status
- Regulated by: Society for Promoting Igbo Language and Culture (SPILC)

Language codes
- ISO 639-3: –
- Glottolog: ngwa1247

The Ngwa dialect is an Igboid language spoken primarily by the Ngwa people of Abia state in south eastern Nigeria.

== Writing system ==
Upper case	A	B	CH	D	E	F	G	GB	GH	GW	H	HN	HW	I	Ị	J	K	KP	KW	L	M	N	Ṅ	NW	NY	O	Ọ	P	R	S	SH	T	U	Ụ	V	W	Y	Z
Lowercase	a	b	ch	d	e	f	g	gb	gh	gw	h	hn	hw	i	ị	j	k	kp	kw	l	m	n	ṅ	nw	ny	o	ọ	p	r	s	sh	t	u	ụ	v	w	y	z
IPA phonemes	a	b	t͡ʃ	d	e	f	g	ɡ͡ɓ~ɓ	ɣ	ɡʷ	ɦ	ɦn	ɦw	i	ɪ̙	d͡ʒ	k	k͡p~ɓ̥	kʷ	l	m	n	ŋ	ŋʷ	ɲ	o	ɔ̙	p	ɹ~ɾ	s	ʃ	t	u	ʊ̙	v	w	j	z

The Ngwa dialect shares a similar alphabet with the Igbo but with additional letters.

The tones are indicated with diacritics:

- the high tone is indicated by the absence of a diacritic:⟨a, e, ẹ, i, ị, o, ọ, u, ụ⟩ ;
- the low tone is indicated with the grave accent : ⟨à, è, ẹ̀, ì, ị̀, ò, ọ̀, ù, ụ̀⟩ ;
- the falling tone is indicated with the circumflex accent : ⟨â, ê, ệ, î, ị̂, ô, ộ, û, ụ̂⟩ ;
- the downstep is indicated with the macron : ⟨ā, ē, ẹ̄, ī, ị̄, ō, ọ̄, ū, ụ̄⟩.
