= National Root Crops Research Institute =

Root crop Research institute in Nigeria

- Founder: Federal Government of Nigeria
- Established: 1955
- Faculty: Root crops
- Location: Abia state, Nigeria
- Website: https://nrcri.gov.ng/

The National Root Crops Research Institute, Umudike, Abia State is an agricultural research institute in Nigeria. Its origins can be traced back to an experimental farm established at Moor Plantation, Ibadan on January 1, 1923 by the Nigerian Department of Agriculture. The School of Agriculture was established in 1955, and the two establishments were combined as the Eastern Nigeria Agricultural Research and Training Station (ARTS) in 1956, with headquarters at Enugu. In 1972, the institution assumed federal status as the Federal Agricultural Research and Training Station (FARTS). In 1976 it was renamed the National Root Crops Research Institute, coming under the Agricultural Research Council of Nigeria. In 1995, the training wing was split off as the Federal College of Agriculture, Ishiagu.

The institute conducts research into genetic improvement of economically important root and tuber crops such as cassava, yam, cocoyam, sweet potato, Irish potato, ginger, rizga, Hausa potato, sugar beets and Turmeric. It also researches subjects such as crop cultivation techniques, storage, processing and utilization of the crops, concentrating on requirements of farmers in the south-east zone of Nigeria. The institute provides training of middle level agricultural workers, awarding National Diplomas and Higher National Diplomas and providing specialized vocational training to farmers.

The institute has received funding from the Generation Challenge Program and the National Agricultural Research Systems to establish a modern laboratory for research into improvements to cassava genetics using molecular markers. The institute collaborates with other regional research centers through the Southern Africa Root Crops Research Network, funded by USAID.

== New crop Research ==
National Root Crops Research Institute Nigeria successful made a research on new varieties of yam root tuber and potatoes which will aid the productivity of farmers.

== Training ==
National Root Crops Research Institute Trained villages about agricultural business and technologies, this is to make and improved the community output and empowerment in agriculture.

=== Support ===
The federal government of Nigeria has pledged to support the National Root Crops Research Institute, in other to foster the production of highly yield roots crops in the nation.
