= Ozu Abam =

Ozu Abam is a town in Arochukwu local government area, Abia State, Nigeria, populated by people from the Abam clan.
