= Ofe Achara =

Igbo soup

- Type: Soup
- Place of origin: Southeast Nigeria (Igboland)
- Region or state: South East
- Serving temperature: Warm
- Main ingredients: Achara Cenchrus purpureus
- Ingredients generally used: Crayfish

Ofe achara is an Igbo soup made mainly from Achara (Elephant grass) and mgbam (egusi balls). Ofe in the language refers to soup.

== Origin ==
The soup is from Abia state which is in the South-Eastern part of Nigeria.

== Overview ==
The beef or smoked fish is boiled with onion and seasoning cubes. Peeled Achara, egusi balls and achi to thicken the soup are added to a pot filled with palm oil. Okazi leaf is added alongside crayfish, salt, grounded pepper and water are added when the oil float on the soup.

It is prepared by finely chopping Achara grass and boiling it until soft. This is followed by adding meat or fish broth, egusi moulds, and other spices to create a unique and flavorful soup. The soup has numerous health benefits and can be paired with fufu, garri, or semolina.

== Other foods ==
Ofe Achara is best served with fufu.

== Health benefits ==
The Achara leaf is rich in fiber and aids digestion and gut health. Egusi, incorporated into the meal, provides healthy fats and protein, while palm oil contains antioxidants and vitamin A. Uziza, on the other hand, helps relieve mild digestive problems, while Ogiri supports gut health through its natural fermentation process.

== See also ==
- Nigeria cuisine
- Arondizuogu
- Oboro (Nigeria)
- Igbo cuisine
