= Abala-Ibeme =

Village in Obingwa, Abia State, Nigeria

- Location in Nigeria
- Country: Nigeria
- State: Abia
- Local Government Area: Obingwa

Area
  - Total: 39 km^{2} (15 sq mi)
- Elevation: 77 m (253 ft)
- Time zone: UTC+1 (West Africa Time)
- Postal code: 453110

Abala-Ibeme or Abala (Mkpọpụta) is a village in Obingwa local government area in Abia State, Nigeria.
