= Eziama Obiato =

Village in Imo State, Nigeria

Eziama_Obiato is a town in Mbaitoli Local Government Area of Imo State, southeastern Nigeria. It was one of the original nine (9) autonomous communities that made up Mbaitoli Local Government Area when it was separated from Mbaitolu/Ikeduru Local Government Area on May 11, 1989.

It is about 22 kilometers to the city of Owerri. The town is strategically located, sharing common boundaries with four other Local Government Areas in Imo State. It is bordered by Akabu Community, Amazano_Umuaka Community, Afara Community, and Umunoha Community. It is noteworthy that the Njaba River separates the community from Awo-Omamma in Oru East LGA. Eziama Obiato is the host community of the popular “Ukwuorji Bus Stop", located along the Owerri–Onitsha Road.

The community is home to a mysterious palm tree with three stems/branches (Osisi-nkwu gbara atọ). This supernatural palm tree has become one of the community’s most fascinating tourist attractions. Remarkably, it is said that only one other palm tree of its kind exists elsewhere in the entire Igbo land. Many indigenes of the town believe that the palm tree is a symbol of unity and progress, with each branch representing one of the three parts (Obi-ato) that make up the town. The community is made up of 10 villages, which are grouped into Ezioha, Umuagha, and Nkwokwu.

Eziama_Obiato is a community rich in culture, tradition, and religious heritage. Historically, the community observed and celebrated a number of traditional festivals and cultural ceremonies, including the New Yam Festival, Igba Ukwa, Emume Ahajioku, Igba Nkalu, and Njaba-elu-oru, among others. However, some of these traditional festivities are no longer actively practiced, largely as a result of changing social and cultural influences.

In more recent times, the community has continued to preserve some of its cultural traditions through festivals such as the Ekeleke and Owu traditional.

Religion, particularly Christianity, occupies an important place in the social and cultural life of the people of Eziama_Obiato. The community has a strong Christian presence, with more than 30 Christian denominations represented.

The coexistence of traditional cultural practices and Christian religious observance reflects the evolving social and cultural identity of Eziama_Obiato and the community's efforts to preserve its heritage while adapting to contemporary influences.

The people of Eziama Obiato hold firmly to the enduring maxim, “A good name is better than silver and gold” (ezi aha ka ego). This traditional value reflects their strong emphasis on integrity, education, hard work, and spirituality. These virtues are deeply respected within the community and often serve as important measures of an individual’s character and standing.

Individuals with criminal tendencies do not feel comfortable living in Eziama Obiato community because the people do not respect or celebrate ill-gotten wealth.
