= Daryll Forde =

British anthropologist (1902–1973)

Cyril Daryll Forde FRAI (16 March 1902 – 3 May 1973) was a British anthropologist and Africanist.

== Education and early career ==
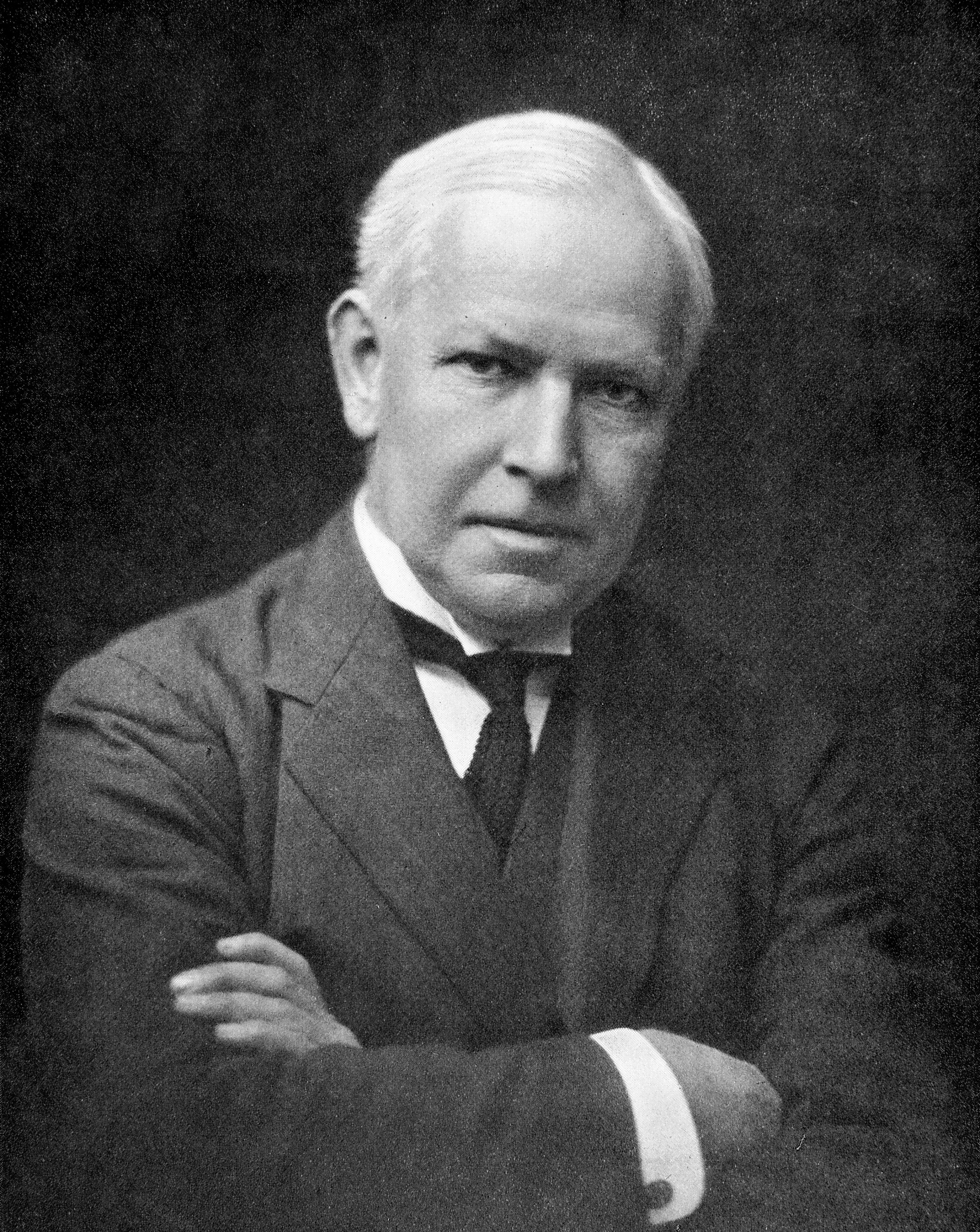
Sir Grafton Elliot Smith (1871–1937) was Forde's mentor and patron at University College London

Forde was born in Tottenham on 16 March 1902, the son of John Percival Daniel Forde, a reverend and schoolmaster, and Caroline Pearce Pittman. He attended the local county school in Tottenham, then went on to read geography at University College London (UCL).

At that time there was no department of anthropology at UCL; the geography department had interests in ethnography and archaeology, but for the most part it was the domain of Grafton Elliot Smith, a professor of anatomy and noted proponent of hyperdiffusionism. Forde studied under Smith and, upon completing his bachelor's degree in 1924, he was appointed a lecturer in the department of anatomy. His earliest work was influenced by Smith's belief that all of human civilisation originated in ancient Egypt. In his first book, Ancient Mariners (1928), Forde traced the origins of shipbuilding and maritime navigation to Egypt, whence he supposed it was carried around the world in ancient voyages:

The history of ancient ships and early maritime adventure thus affords the most definite evidence of the reality of the ancient diffusion of culture and the chief means whereby it was effected. It also reveals the fact that the ships in which the great sea-going exploits were achieved, whether in the Mediterranean and Atlantic, the Red or the Erythraean Sea, or the Pacific, were mainly vessels such as were elaborated in the Ancient East and inspired by Egyptian models. Egypt provided much of the cultural cargo of these Ancient Mariners, as well as their ships and their knowledge of seamanship.

— C. Daryll Forde, Ancient Mariners (1928), p. 86

Smith and Forde also collaborated on the excavation of a Bronze Age tumulus near Dunstable. The main focus of his research in the anatomy department, however, was the megalithic cultures of prehistoric western Europe. In this he was influenced by the culture historical theories of V. Gordon Childe, who would become a lifelong friend and collaborator. Childe tempered Forde's enthusiasm for hyperdiffusionism, but Forde still advanced the idea that European megaliths were a "degenerated" imitation of monuments in the Near East. This theory remained influential in archaeology for many years.

Forde's archaeological work won him the Society of Antiquaries' prestigious Franks Studentship in 1924, and in 1928 he was awarded a doctorate in prehistoric archaeology.

== Fellowship at Berkeley (1928–1930) ==
After receiving his doctorate, Forde won a Commonwealth Fellowship to work with the American anthropologists Alfred Kroeber and Robert Lowie at the University of California, Berkeley. He had been introduced to Lowie during the latter's visit to London in 1924. Both Kroeber and Lowie were students of Franz Boas, making Berkeley an influential early centre of what became known as Boasian anthropology. The intellectual climate there—very different to anthropology in Britain—had a profound effect on Forde's scholarship. He would later refer to it as his "transatlantic noviciate".

Both Kroeber and Lowie also had backgrounds in archaeology, but were committed to the Boasian four field approach and the holistic study of humanity. They therefore encouraged Forde to conduct ethnographic fieldwork with local Native American tribes. He worked with the Yuma of the lower Colorado river valley and the Hopi of northern Arizona, leading to his most well-known work, Habitat, Economy and Society: a Geographical Introduction to Ethnology (1934). At Berkeley, he was trained in ecological anthropology and brought this tradition with him back to the UK.

== Chair at Aberystwyth University (University College of Wales, Aberystwyth) 1930-1945 ==
In 1930, when still only 28 years old, Daryll Forde was appointed Gregynog Professor of Geography and Anthropology at the University College of Wales, Aberystwyth. It was here, aged 31, that he commenced a 5-year excavation programme on the local Iron Age hillfort of Pen Dinas between 1933 and 1937, answering many earlier calls made during the 1920s for the excavation and dating of a local hillfort. Contemporary photographs of the excavation show the young Daryll Forde on site, well-dressed among the workmen and clearly enjoying directing one of the largest hillfort excavations in southern Britain at that time. It was during his early years at Aberystwyth in 1934 that he also published his influential text book 'Habitat, Economy and Society'.

== Later career ==
From 1945 he worked at University College London, and built a school of American-style cultural anthropology there, distinct from the social anthropology of British-trained contemporaries such as Alfred Radcliffe-Brown, Meyer Fortes and E. E. Evans-Pritchard.

From 1935 he worked in Nigeria with the Yakö people. His work in Africa resulted in several volumes of African Worlds: Studies in the Cosmological Ideas and Social Values of African Peoples (1954). From 1945 to 1973 he was the director of the International African Institute.

UCL's department of anthropology has an annual lecture series and a seminar room named in his honour.
