= Amaoba =

Community in Abia State, Nigeria

Amaoba Emeaba
- Village
- Location of Amaoba in Nigeria
- Coordinates: 5.4508°N 7.5416°E
- Country: Nigeria
- State: Abia State
- L.G.A: Ikwuano
- Clan: Oboro

Government
  - Type: Monarchy
  - Eze: HRH Eze Emmanuel Nwankwo O'tuwa (Amaoba Ime), HRH Eze David Chukwuemeka Isinguzo (Abaa Ukwu) & HRH Chijioke Imo (Amaoba Ikputu)
- Elevation: 152 m (499 ft)

Population
  - Ethnicities: Igbo
  - Religion: Christianity
- Time zone: UTC+1 (WAT)
- 3-digit postal code prefix: 440109
- Area code: 440
- ISO 3166 code: NG.AB.IK
- Website: https://www.nigeriapostcode.com/abia-ikwuano-oboro-amaoba-ime.html https://www.nigeriapostcode.com/abia-ikwuano-oboro-amaoba-ikputu.html

Amaoba is an Oboro community in Ikwuano Local Government Area of Abia State, Nigeria. It consists of two autonomous sister villages, Amaoba Ime and Amaoba Ikputu. Abaa Ukwu, Amaoba Ime and Ikputu Oboro are the three autonomous communities of Amaoba. Amaoba is 13 km away from the state's capital, Umuahia.

== History ==
According to elders of the land, a long time ago, there was a man, Odugbo Ajonu, whose family had a conflict with an elder, Mazi Odugbo in Alayi near Uzuakoli and came to settle at a portion of the land now known as Oboroland. He left with his junior brother Mazi Idima, who decided to settle at the present Abam where he met his own luck. Mazi Odugbo Ajonu was born a warrior who warred irrespective of relation; hence his relatives ejected him out from Alayi. When he first entered into the Oboroland, he begot his first son and named him Eme Aba, and he still planned for more wars. (i.e. the present Amaoba, who were at Olori). With the same wife, he begot Mazi Akputu the present 'Ikputu' who was his second son.

When his near and far neighbors could not bear his unexpected war attacks, he was forced to another unoccupied area, where he begot Mazi Ututu (Izuzu Ututu). Ututu was nicknamed 'Oru' by which the present Ndioru was named after.

Mazi Akputu fathered three sons: Ukala (also known as Azukala), Etiti (referred to as Etiti Ulo), and Enwe (recognized as Umu Enwe). Their designated market day is Orie Uku, where they oversee the affairs of Amaoba's general deity, Ibeku.

The present war house (God) at Amaoba Ime named Agbala was captured during a big war between Amaoba and his brothers against the then Umuchichi. When Umuchichi was conquered and captured, Agbala was also captured at Amaoba. In those days, the entire Oboro nation settled at Olori, a place where water was unavailable.

During Mazi Eme Aba's stay at Olori, he begot Mazi Umo, Ulu, and Ohia under one wife and begot Mazi Otugh, Okele, and Ika under the junior wife. Ndaeri and Umuohia are part and parcel of Umu Umo.

'Ikputu' was derived from 'Akpautu' which means one who does not follow the advice of others. Ikputu was of the same mother as Amaoba Ime. Ikputu was the first to be ejected from Olori before Amaoba Ime. It happened that a cow belonging to one Mazi Agbaike of Ikputu was discovered in Anya Ikputu in the same way Mazi Adindu's cow of Amaoba Ime was discovered in Odokiri. Ikputu was removed from near the waters.

Mazi Akputu begot three sons: Ukala (Azukala), Etiti (Etiti Ulo) and Enwe (Umu Enwe). Their market day is Orie Uku They took care of Amaoba's general god named Ikenga.

== Sub-villages ==
The two communities (Amaoba Ime & Amaoba Ikputu) contain 9 sub-villages combined.

-Amaoba Ikputu (3 villages)

- Azukala
- Etiti Ulo
- Umuenwe

-Amaoba Ime (6 villages)

- Umumo
- Ndiulu
- Umuohia
- Umuikaa
- Umuoshotugh
- Umuokele

== See also ==
- Abam
- Ndoro
