= Umuahia South =

- LGA
- Interactive map of Umuahia South
- Country: Nigeria
- State: Abia State
- Capital: Apumiri

Area
  - Total: 140 km^{2} (54 sq mi)

Population (2022)
  - Total: 202,500
  - Density: 1,400/km^{2} (3,700/sq mi)
- Time zone: UTC+1 (WAT)
- Postal code: 440

Umuahia South is a Local Government Area of Abia State, Nigeria. Its headquarters is at Apumiri in Ubakala. Towns include Apumiri, Ezeleke, Ekenobizi.

It has an area of 140 km^{2} and a population of 138,570 at the 2006 census.

The postal code of the area is 440.

== Climate ==
Umuahia has a tropical monsoon climate (Classification: Am) and is zero metres/feet above sea level. The district's average annual temperature is -0.88% lower than Nigeria's averages at 28.58 °C (83.44 °F). Approximately 273.49 millimetres (10.77 inches) of precipitation and 263.52 rainy days (72.2%) are usual for Umuahia each year.

== Locality ==
There are five districts and ten electoral wards in Umuahia South. Towns under Umuahia South Local Government Area include:

- Ahiaukwu
- Amakama
- Ubakala
- Nsirimo
- Ezeleke
- Ogbodiukwu
- Ohiya
- Omaegwu
- Old Umuahia
- Umuihe

== See also ==
- List of villages in Abia State
