= Ndoro, Abia State =

Town in Abia State, Nigeria

Ndoro Ndioru Oru Oboro Autonomous Community
- Town
- Nickname: Oru
- Motto: Oru Di Nma
- Location of Ndoro in Nigeria
- Coordinates: 5°26′13″N 7°33′56″E
- Country: Nigeria
- State: Abia State
- L.G.A: Ikwuano
- Clan: Oboro

Government
  - Type: Monarchy
  - Eze: HRM Eze Ralph Ukachi Ogbonna

Area
  - Total: 0.2 km^{2} (0.077 sq mi)
- Elevation: 133 m (436 ft)

Population (2015)
  - Total: 9,053
  - Density: 56,627/km^{2} (146,660/sq mi)
  - Ethnicities: Igbo
  - Religion: Christianity
- Time zone: UTC+01:00 (WAT)
- 3-digit postal code prefix: 440109
- Area code: 440
- ISO 3166 code: NG.AB.IK
- Website: https://ng.geoview.info/ndoro,2329193

Ndoro (originally pronounced Ndi-oru; Igbo for People of Oru) is a town in Oboro, Ikwuano Local Government Area of Abia State, Nigeria. It is about 16 km southeast from the state capital, Umuahia and is located along the Umuahia-Ikot Ekpene Road.

Oru Oboro is the only autonomous community of Ndoro, hence, the people of Ndoro are called Ndi Oru. The traditional ruler of the Oru Onyerubi Ancient Kingdom as at 2022 is HRM Eze Ralph Ukachi Ogbonna in whom is conferred with the title of Oru 1 of Oru Onyerubi.

== History ==
When Mazi Odugbo Ajonu was ejected by his neighbours at Olori, he settled at a non-occupied area, there he begot Mazi Ututu. Mazi Ututu was nicknamed Oru, hence the present Ndi Oru (translates to Mazi Oru's family). Ndi Oru as well as the other families are well noted for their bravery, like their fore father, Odugbo. They formed an alliance with Amaoba Ime, Ikputu, Ogbuebulle, Abam and other distant families.

Ndi Oru was formerly known as Umu Ututu, hence some aged men and women still call them Umu-Utiti. Mazi Ututu begot five children, namely; Ndi Uku (Ezi Uku), Ji-Ocha (Umujiocha), Nkeke (Umu Nkeke), Okereke Ugo (Umu Ugo) and Okamgba (Ezi Oka). The first Warrant Chief was the Late Mazi Okoronta Ujah.

== Culture ==
Ndoro marks the Ekpe and Iri Ji (New Yam) festivals by January and September respectively annually. The town also organises sporting events and a carnival (which holds on December).

== Religion ==
Traditionally, Oru people recognize the existence of God and the creator (chi-na-eke) who was worshipped through other lesser gods and goddesses which include;

- Nne Mmiri (god mother in water)
- Kamanu (god of thunder)
- Aha Njoku (goddess of yams)
- Ala Isi Ama (goddess of the earth)
- Ebo Omumu (goddess of fertility)
- Ebo Ihu Abuo (goddess of protection)
- Oji Ama (Iroko tree of location).

== Education ==
Oru was a center for evangelism in Igboland and citadel of education in Ikwuano. Missionaries established churches as well as sunday schools. Classes started from 1913 to 1922 and by 1939, the brilliant ones were promoted to teachers. The first person to obtain the cambridge standard six certificate was Ejikeme Nlewedim in 1946.

The Teachers' Training College led to the establishment of Oboro Methodist School in 1965. After the Civil War, the federal government took over the school and renamed it to Oboro Secondary School. In September 1984, the Methodist Church established Wesley Seminary, Ndoro with Chief M.A Atuonwu as the pioneer principal.

== Hamlets ==
There are ten sub-villages in Ndoro namely :

- Ezi Ukwu
- Ezi Uka
- Ezi Uja
- Ezi Mba
- Ezi Nkume
- Agbommiri
- Obuofuo
- Umujiocha
- Amaorji
- Aro Ayama

== Ahia Ndoro ==
Ahia Ndoro is the main market of Ndoro. It is the biggest and most influential market in Ikwuano. As a commercial hub of the area, it attracts traders from the neighboring Akwa Ibom State and is a major food exchange point in Abia State. Farmers from neighboring communities come there to sell their farm produce. The market has been a significant contributor to the generation of revenue for the community. Ahia Ndoro acts as a linkage to other communities of Ikwuano.

== Schools ==
- Wesley Seminary, Ndoro Oboro
- Ndoro Central School
