= Ngwa people =

Igbo group living in Southeastern Nigeria

Ṅgwà

Total population
- 314,840 (1963, census)

Regions with significant populations
- Abia State

Languages
- Ngwa; English

Religion
- Christianity (mostly Adventist, Anglican and Catholic); Omenala

Related ethnic groups
- Other Igbo people; Ibibio; Ndoki

The Ngwa people (natively: Nde Ṅgwà IPA: [ŋɡʷa]) are an Igbo group living in the southern part of Igboland. The Ngwa people are found predominantly in Abia State with a population of 314,840 in 1963. They cover 1,328 square kilometres (513 mi^{2}) and are the largest subgroup of Igbo people.

They are bounded by the Imo River in the west and the Anaang and Ibibio people in the east. The Asa and Ndoki people share a boundary in the south. Ngwaland borders Ubakala and Olokoro people in the north and Isuorgu in the northeast.

Chineke is considered the most powerful god in the pantheon of Ngwa gods. Others include Ohanjoku and Amadioha. In pre-colonial Ngwa, the Okonko society and Ekpe served as law enforcers. Festivals in Ngwaland include Ekpe and Owu masquerade festivals and the Ikoro drama festival.

The Ngwa people speak the Ngwa dialect which is rich in idioms and proverbs. They are predominantly Christians, but also practice tradition religion and customs. The Ngwa people are mainly farmers, producing crops such as yam, cassava, cocoyam and palm oil. Importation of iron for hoes and machete began around the 16th and 19th century.

== History ==
=== Origin and migration ===
The Ngwa people are a part of the Isuama people who lived in the Orlu area. The founders of Ngwaland and other Igbo groups emigrated from Umunoha through Ama-Igbo and arrived at Ezinihitte at an unknown date due to an increase in population in the Owerri area and due to the need of virgin land for cultivating. Some groups moved northwards into the Umuahia, Etiti and Mbano axis while the founders of Ngwaland and the Ohuhu moved southwards towards the Imo River.

On reaching at the west bank of the Imo River, the group became tired, and they decided to eat. Three brothers; Ngwaukwu, Nwoha and Avosi quickly boiled their yam and crossed over the Imo River before their companions; the Imo River grew and held their companions at the bank. The Ngwa people first settled at Okpuala Ngwa where they performed their first ritual. The Ngwa people are said to have displaced the Ibibio and Ibeme people driving them eastward.

After settling in Okpuala Ngwa, the founders of Ngwaland created the eight original villages—Ntigha-Okpuala, Eziala-Nsulu, Amaku-Nvosi, Amauha Ovokwu, Umuokwu Mbutu, Orie-Afo Umuoha, Okpu Ngwa Ovunkwu and Okpuala-Ngwa. After the establishment of villages groups by the Ngwa people, they moved down to the eastern part of Ngwaland and further into the northwestern and southern part. Some Ngwa farmers settled in the northwest of the present Ngwa region before the Atlantic slave trade began but the area saw the establishment of more villages and increase in population from the sixteenth to nineteenth centuries. They further migrated into the Ndoki, Asa and Bonny areas around the 14th century.

=== Pre-colonial, colonial and post-colonial era ===
The Aro people gained access to Ngwaland through members of the Okonko society with originated from the Efik-Ibibio area. Trade routes were established in Bende, Umuahia and Aba. In order to meet the demand for slaves from the Bight of Biafra, Ngwa people condemned by the Long Juju for defaulting the laws of Ngwaland and people kidnapped by the members of the Okonko society in Ngwaland.

The Ngwa people made contacts with the British during the period when slave trading was being banned; this saw the establishment of the first consular post at Obegu in 1895. Ngwaland was made a British colony after the Anglo-Aro War in 1901. The garrison and district headquarter at Ndokiland was moved to Aba-Ngwa in 1902 and 1903 respectively.

In the 21st century, Ngwaland was divided into eight local government areas.

== Geography ==
The Ngwa people are found in southern Igbo land and the largest group of Igbo people with a landmass of 1,328 square kilometres (513 mi^{2}) and an estimated population of 314,840 in 1963. Ngwaland is bounded by the Imo River in the west, and the Anang-Ibibio people in the east. The Asa and Ndoki people share boundaries in the south. Ngwaland borders Ubakala and Olokoro people in the north and Isuorgu in the northeastern part. Ngwaland are divided into four parts; northern, southern, northwestern and eastern Ngwa. Ngwaland lies in a flat agricultural land with the highest elevation of 30 metres (100 feet) in the basin of the Aza river in the south-east with an annual rainfall of 2,000 to 2,500 millimetres (80 to 100 inches) and an average annual temperature of 27 degrees (80 degrees Fahrenheit). Ngwaland has a humid tropical type of climate with the seasons divided between wet and dry seasons, with the rainy season lasting from March to November.

There are three main watercourses in Ngwaland; the Imo River, the Azi River which rises in the Umuahia area and the Oji River which rises at Nsirimo in Ubakala.

In the 21st century, Ngwa people are found in 7 local government area of Abia State, namely: Obingwa, Osisioma Ngwa, Isiala Ngwa North, Isiala Ngwa South, Aba North, Ugwunagbo and Aba South.

== Culture ==
Precolonial Ngwa land were practitioners of African religion and worship their gods as part of their culture. Yam, maize, cassava, cocoyam, vegetables, oranges, palms, fruits make up majority of the food crops. The men in Ngwaland are the only people allowed to speak at the main village meetings where the affairs of the people are discussed while married women hold village meetings where internal affairs were discussed and these meetings also served as savings clubs. Ngwa people practice polygamy. The Ngwa people believe in procreation and reincarnation and believe that childbirth through marriage is the only means of reincarnation. The Ekpe and Okonko secret societies served as moral enforcement societies in pre-colonial Ngwaland, as decisions reached by the lineage council was enforced by them. The Ekpe and Okonko society were introduced to Ngwaland through Aros and originally from their neighbours in Cross River. The Okonko Society was reserved strictly for men. The young unmarried women are sometimes inducted into mgbede to undergo a nutritional course aimed at fattening and preparing them for marriage to suitors.

Ekpe and Owu masquerades are part of the each of year festivals in Ngwaland. Agwu-Ikoro, a part of the Ikoro farming festival is popular among the Mbutu villages in Ngwaland. The Ekpe dance festival is an annual religious festival among the Ngwa people (except for Obioma Ngwa) with influence in the Umuahia and Owerri axes. Originating from the Aros, it is performed on the Eke market day.

In Obingwa, the Ikoro festival—a costume drama where the Ikoro is used for its performance —is celebrated in place of the Ekpe.

=== Language and literature ===
Ngwa dialect which is filled with idioms and proverbs is spoken in Ngwaland. It is used as means of communication in trade, folktales, community and village meeting and entertainment with the Standard Igbo being the preferred language for administrative and educational purposes. The Ngwa dialect is classified it as an Igboid dialect under the New Benue Congo subfamily of the Niger Congo phylum and among the south-eastern group of dialects.

=== Religion ===
Prior to the arrival of the British, the Ngwa people worshipped the deities that were indigenous to their village which Chineke (Note: Standard Igbo: Chukwu) was and still is considered the most powerful in the pantheon of gods. Other gods include Ohanjoku and Amadioha. Through the means of colonization, Christian missionaries converted most Ngwa people from their indigenous religious practice to Christianity particularly, the Seventh-day Adventist, Anglican and Catholic. In the 21st century, majority of Ngwa people are Christians with very few practicing traditional Ngwa religion with Okpuala Ngwa being the capital of such practices.

== Economy ==
Due to the fertile land, the economy of Ngwa people in pre-colonial era was solely based on farming. Written information about the economy before 1900 is scare. The Ngwa people were majorly involved in international trade. The Ngwa people started importing iron for hoes and machete around the sixteenth and nineteenth century. The nineteenth century saw the involvement of Ngwa people in the production of palm oil and from the 1870s palm kernel for export.

The Slave trade was later conducted by members of Okonko society in Ngwaland. With the emergence of the British, the slave trade was slowly replaced by palm oil production and trading.

During the second World War, the prices of palm oil and kernel were beginning to recover; which gave rise to the construction of the Eastern Railway which runs through Ngwaland. From 1919 to 1920, there was an expansion of palm oil production and a labour-saving processing technique. The railway created sizeable food markets for the sale of cassava; either as garri or as akpu. Palm wine was another source of income for the Ngwa people.

Since the Nigerian Civil War, cassava has become a more important cash crop in the Ngwa villages.

"Isusu" a form of banking institution aiding in raising money for business or marriage in pre-colonial Ngwa. This form of banking system is still practiced.
