= Ekpe =

Nigerian secret society

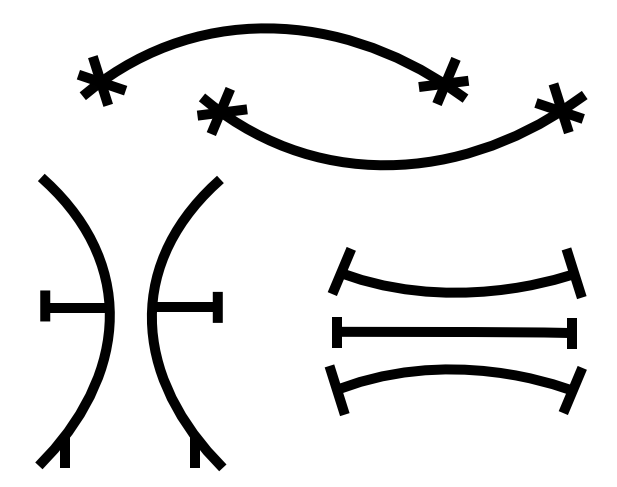
Nsibidi symbols, used by the Ekpe society

Ekpe, also known as Mgbe/Egbo (Ekoi language: leopard; derived from the Efik term for the same), is a West African secret society in Nigeria and Cameroon flourishing chiefly among the Ejagham. It is also found among a number of other ethnic groups, including the Efik and Bahumono of the Cross River State, the Ibibio, the Uruan and the Oron of Akwa Ibom State, Arochukwu and some other parts of Abia State, as well as in the diaspora, such as in Cuba and Brazil. The society is still active at the beginning of the 21st century, now playing more of a ceremonial role.

There are two distinct but related societies. The primary society is located in the Cross River, Akwa Ibom and Arochukwu areas of Nigeria, and the secondary society consists of members from the Southern and Eastern Igbo groups of the same country.

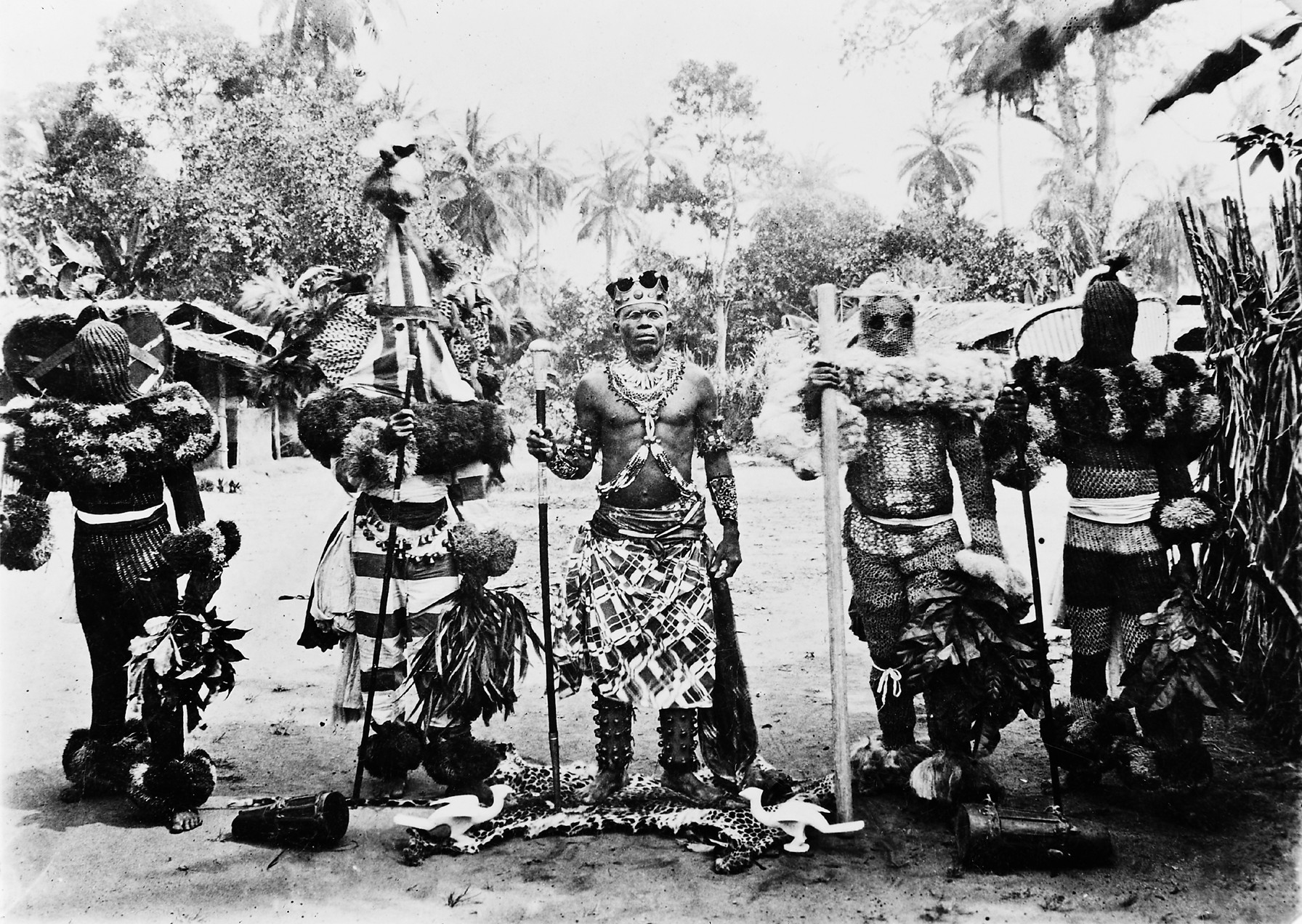
Ekpe costumes from South Nigeria

== Ekpe ==
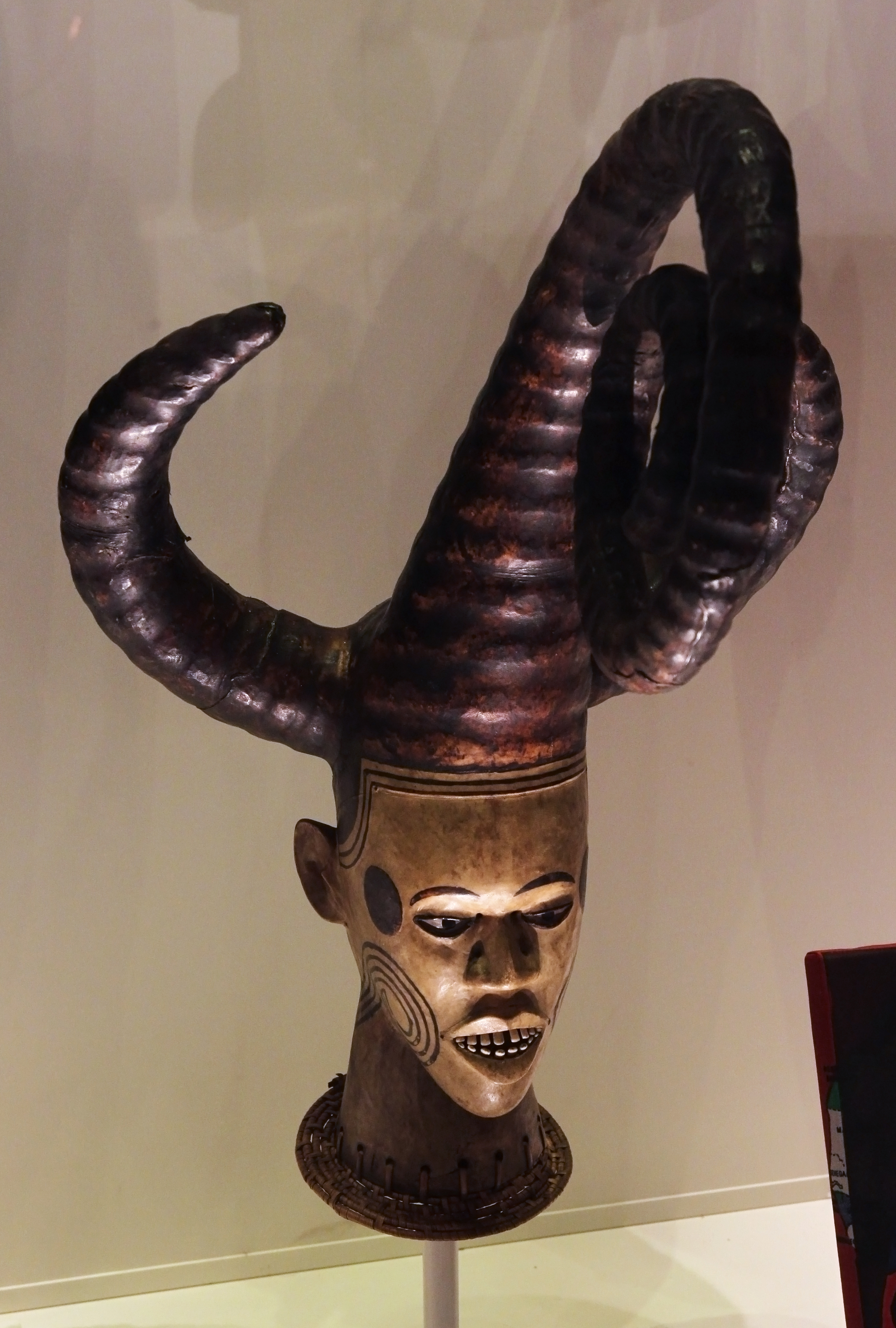
Ekpe Ekoi skin-covered headdress

Ekpe is a mysterious spirit who is supposed to live in the jungle and to preside at the ceremonies of the society. Members of the Ekpe society are said to act as messengers of the ancestors (ikan). The economics of the society is based on paying tribute to the village ancestors. Only males can join, boys being initiated about the age of puberty. Members are bound by oath of secrecy, and fees on entrance are payable. The Ekpe-men are ranked in seven or nine grades, for promotion to each of which fresh initiation ceremonies, fees and oaths are necessary.

The society combines a kind of freemasonry with political and law enforcing aims. For instance any member wronged in an Ekpe district, that is one dominated by the society, has only to address an Ekpe-man or beat the Ekpe drum in the Ekpe-house, or blow Ekpe as it is called, i.e., sound the Ekpe horn, before the hut of the wrong-doer, and the whole machinery of the society is put in force to see justice done. Ekpe members always wear masks when performing their police duties, and although individuals may nonetheless be recognized, fear of retribution from the ikan stops people from accusing those members who may overstep their limits. Formerly the society earned a bad reputation due to what the British viewed as the barbarous customs that were intermingled with its rites.

== The Amama ==
Social importance is attached to the highest ranks of Ekpe-men, called the Amama. At least in the past, very large sums were paid to attain these upper levels. The trade-off is that the Amama often control the majority of the community wealth. The Amama often appropriate hundreds of acres of palm trees for their own use and, with the profits they earn, ensure that their sons achieve comparable rank, which has the effect of limiting access to economic gain for other members of the community. The Ekpe society requires that its initiates sponsor feasts for the town, which foster the appearance of the redistribution of wealth by providing the poor with food and drink.

== Ekpe in the diaspora ==
=== Abakuá ===
Abakuá is an Afro-Cuban men's initiatory fraternity, or secret society, which originated from the Ekpe society in the Cross River region of southeastern Nigeria and southwestern Cameroon.

== See also ==
- Abakuá
- Abwoi religion
- Leopard Society
