= Eze =

Igbo word meaning 'King'

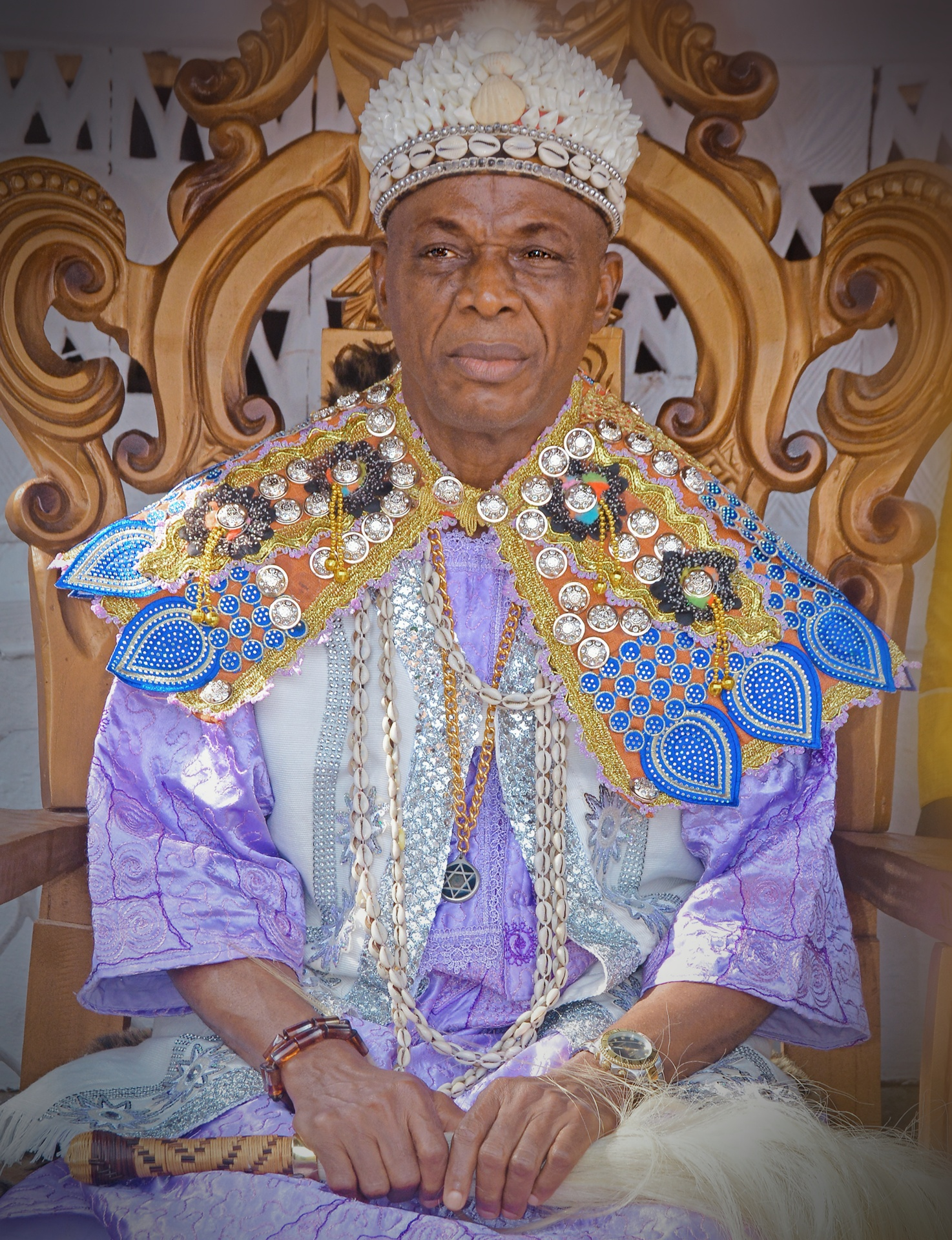
Photo of His Royal Majesty, Eze Chukwuemeka Eri; the Traditional Ruler of Enugwu Aguleri in his royal regalia.

Eze // (pronounced [ézè]) is an Igbo word which means king. Such titles as Igwe, Ezeike and Obi plus others are used by Igbo people of West Africa as royal titles. Igwe is derived from the Igbo word Igwekala or Eluigwekala: "the sky or heaven above the sky is higher or bigger than land;" implying that the Eze is a higher servant of the people. Obi usually refers to the centre building for receiving visitors within an Igbo leader's or man's homestead. When used as a title of respect for the Eze, Obi implies: "the one who sits in the throne house or heart of the Kingdom."

In Igbo tradition and culture, the Eze is normally an elective monarch advised by a council of chiefs or elders whom he appoints based on their good standing within the community. A popular saying in Igbo is "Igbo enwe eze", which translates to "the Igbo have no king." This popular saying does not, however, capture the complexity of Igbo societies as it has been explored in many centuries of anthropological, sociological and political research. In many ways, it is a comment on a cultural disregard for authority and nationhood as seen in the build-up and aftermath of the Biafran Civil War.

The Igbo people had and still have ruling bodies of royal and political leaders in which an individual can be recognized by the entire society as primus inter pares, i.e., first among equals. This status is usually hereditary among the male lineage, since Igbo culture is patrilineal. Women in Igbo cultures were known to develop parallel social hierarchies through which they both competed and collaborated with their counterpart male kingship and governing hierarchies. However, there was one woman Eze in colonial Nigeria, Ahebi Ugbabe.

== Kingship in Igboland ==
Scholars generally believe that Igbo kingship institutions developed from three sources. The first is indigenous and ancient priesthood, which traditionally combined clerical and political duties of leaders in the village-based republics. Ezes were recognized in Arochukwu, Awka, Nri-Igbo, Owere, Northern Nsukka and Ngwa: the most populous Igbo sub-group. In Ngwa, Josaiah Ndubuisi Wachuku was Eze from ancestral, royal lineage. Enugu-Ezike, Ovoko, and Iheakpu-Awka are home to the Igbo-Eze communities. The King is variously referred to as Eze or Ezedike, depending on lineage. In Oguta, the term Ezeigwe is used.

Secondly, the neighboring Benin Empire imposed certain conventions by colonizing certain parts of Nigeria. According to an opposite view, the Eze of Nri influenced the constitution of the Benin Oba's status. Differing points of view are focused particularly on the communities of Asaba, Onitsha, and Oguta. According to some scholars who argue against what is known as the Afigbo and Omenka Thesis on Origin, Igbo kings of these places trace the historical roots of their investiture immediately to the Oba of Benin.

The third source of Igbo kingship is believed to be 19th and 20th century colonial rule by the British. Under a policy of indirect rule, the colonial administration created "warrant chiefs," selecting recognised individuals to serve as administrators, rulers, judges and tax collectors. Native to their communities, warrant chiefs were usually selected from among those men who were most cooperative with the colonial administration. For this and a number of other reasons, Igbo populations often resented and sometimes overtly resisted the authority of warrant chiefs. An example of such resistance is the Igbo Women's War of 1929.

After Nigeria gained its constitutional independence from Britain on Saturday 1 October 1960, many of those warrant chiefs tried to maintain their power by seeking to recast their political roles. Those with political influence and new-found wealth bought honorary Eze- sounding titles. They clamored to be among traditional rulers retained by government of independent Nigeria.
