= Igbo architecture =

Architecture of Igbo people

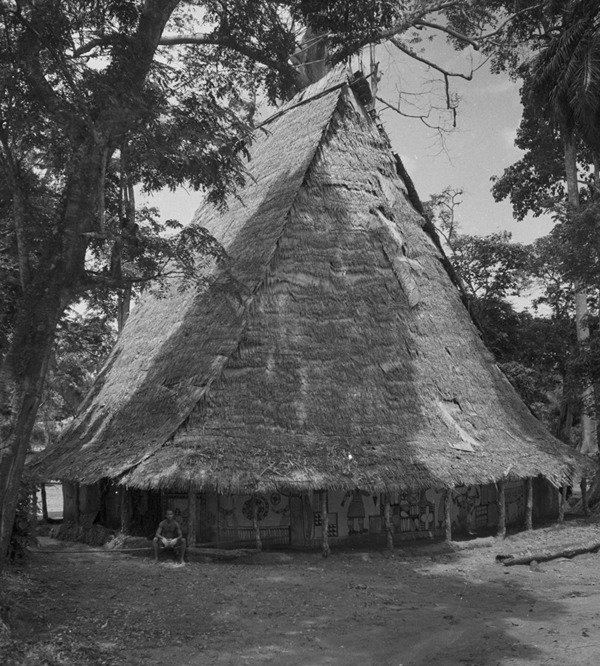
Ekpe (leopard society) meeting house

Igbo Architecture are architectural style developed by the Igbo people. The traditional style is distinct in its usage of mud/laterite soil, rocks, thatch, palm, reeds, etc. Igbo Architecture varies from region to region within Igboland, with different ways of spatial organization and ways of building. Igbo architecture is also unique in its usage of symbolism, such as in its usage of Uli (design), Nsibidi, layout of buildings/compounds, trees which some at times planted with the unbiblical cord after a child is born, and areas for shrine worship.

== Traditional Igbo Architecture ==
A traditional Igbo Architecture consists of Compounds, Wall/fence and Moats, Thatched Buildings, Verandas, Courtyards, Decorative motifs etc.

Traditional Igbo architecture is distinctive by several usual attributes and principled designs which is reflective of the cultural, environmental, and practical needs of the Igbo people. As a result, there are various Igbo architectural styles ranging from the architectural styles of the Western Igbo speakers to the northern Igbo architectural style, etc.

== Image gallery ==
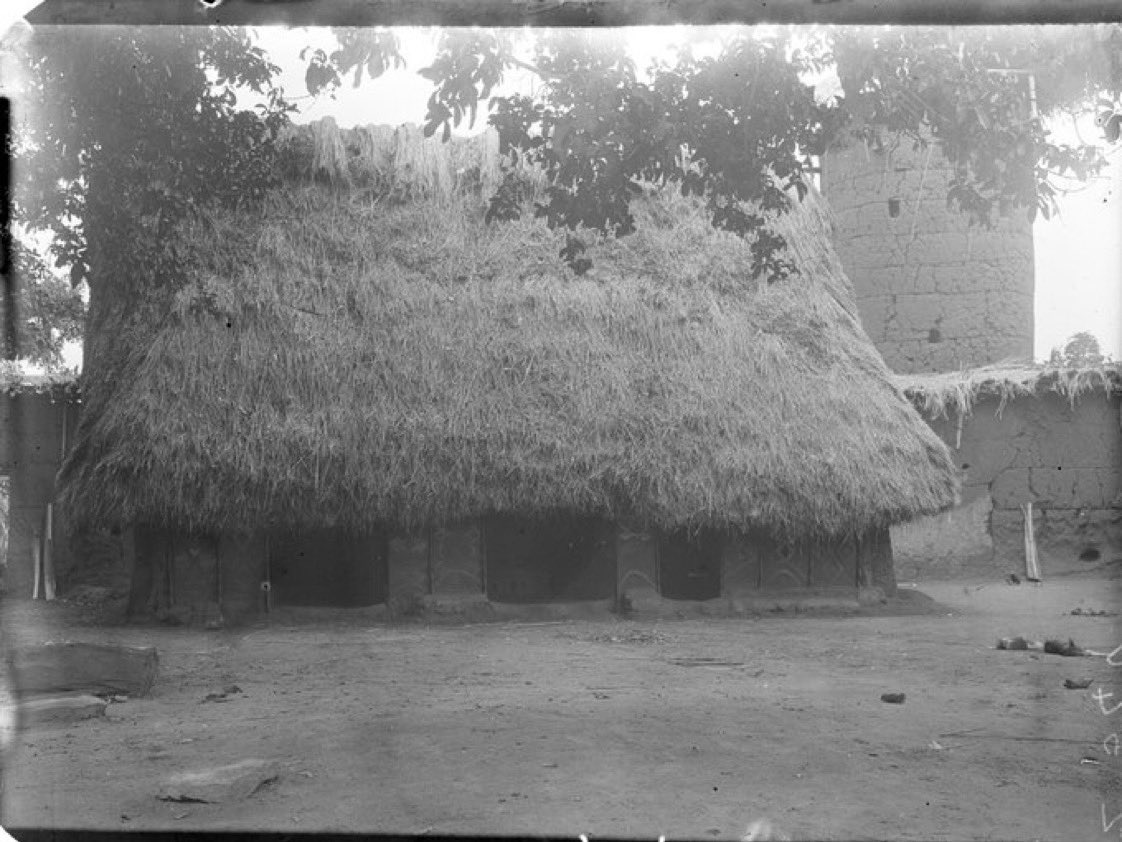
Igbo Pre-Colonial Architecture, A House & Tower Behind

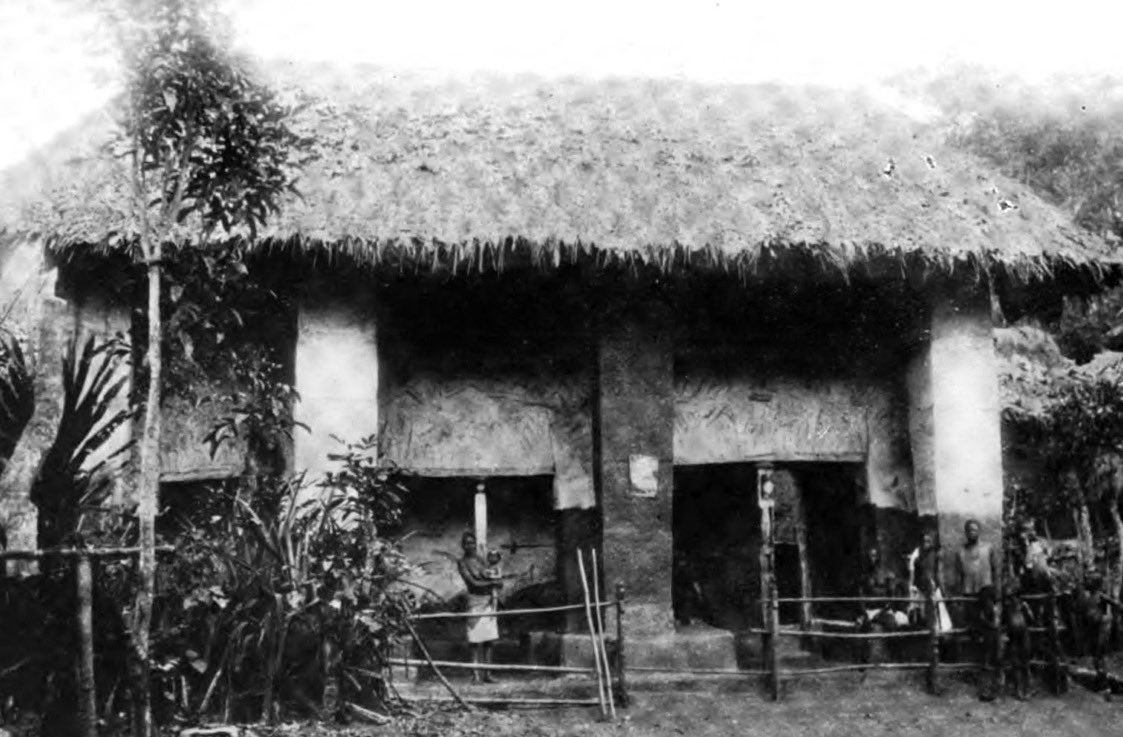
Traditional Igbo Thatched Architecture

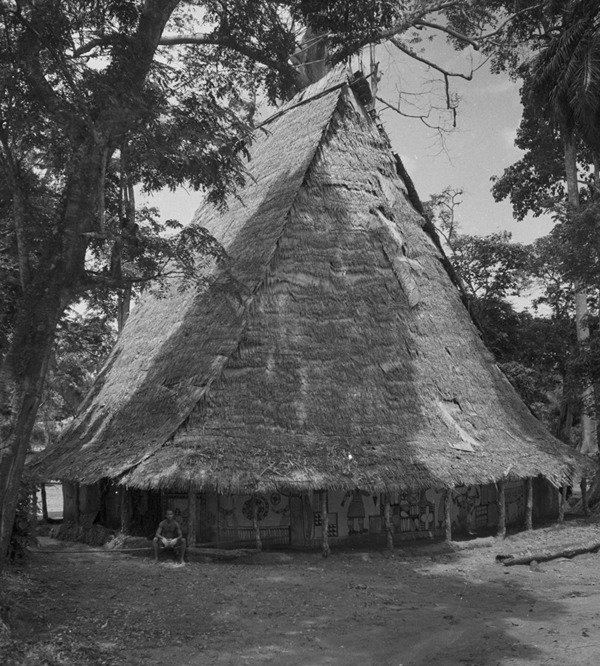
Ekpe (leopard society) meeting house

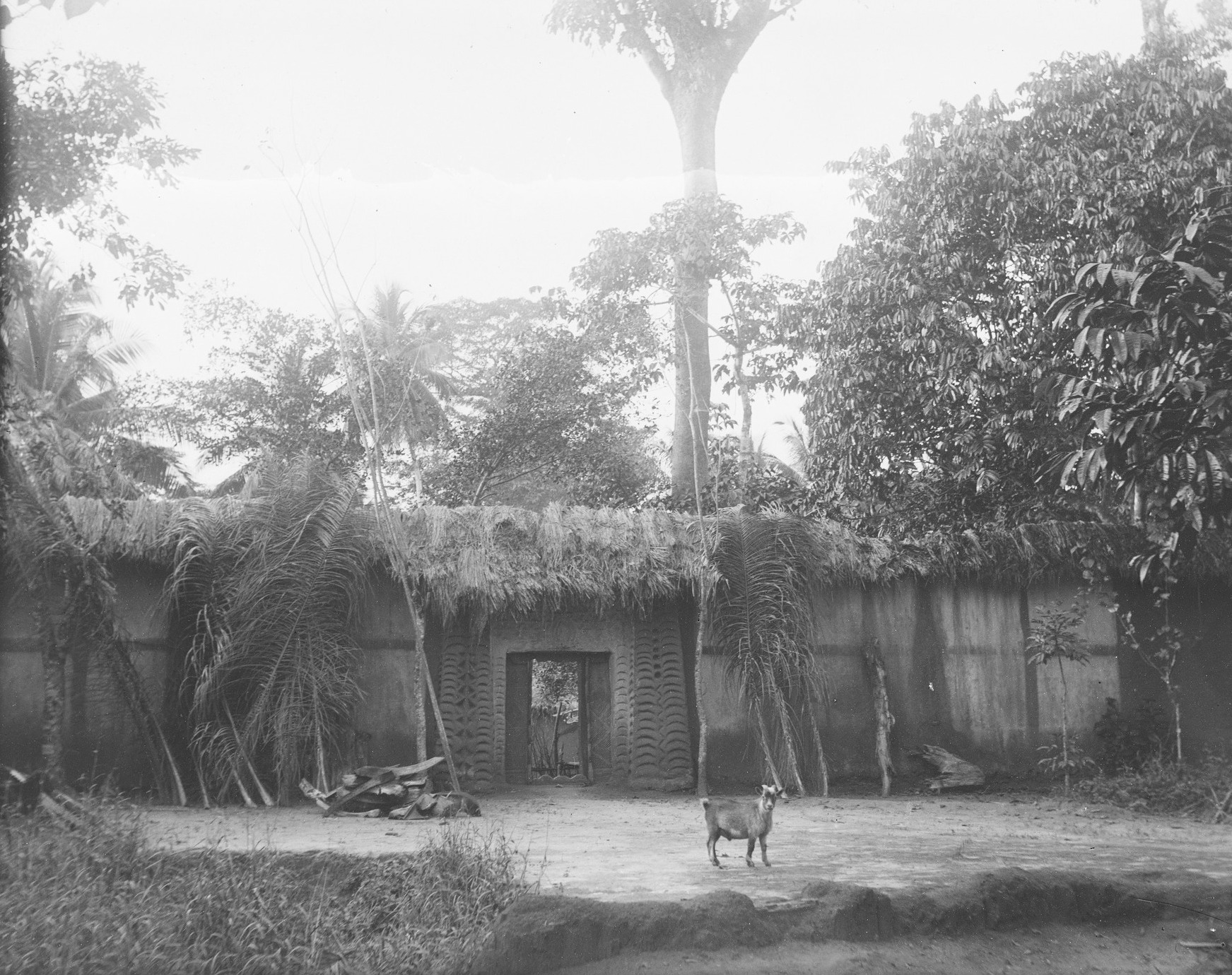
An Igbo compound entrance, in or near Önïcha. Photographed by Herbert Wimberley, c. 1903–18. Cambridge University

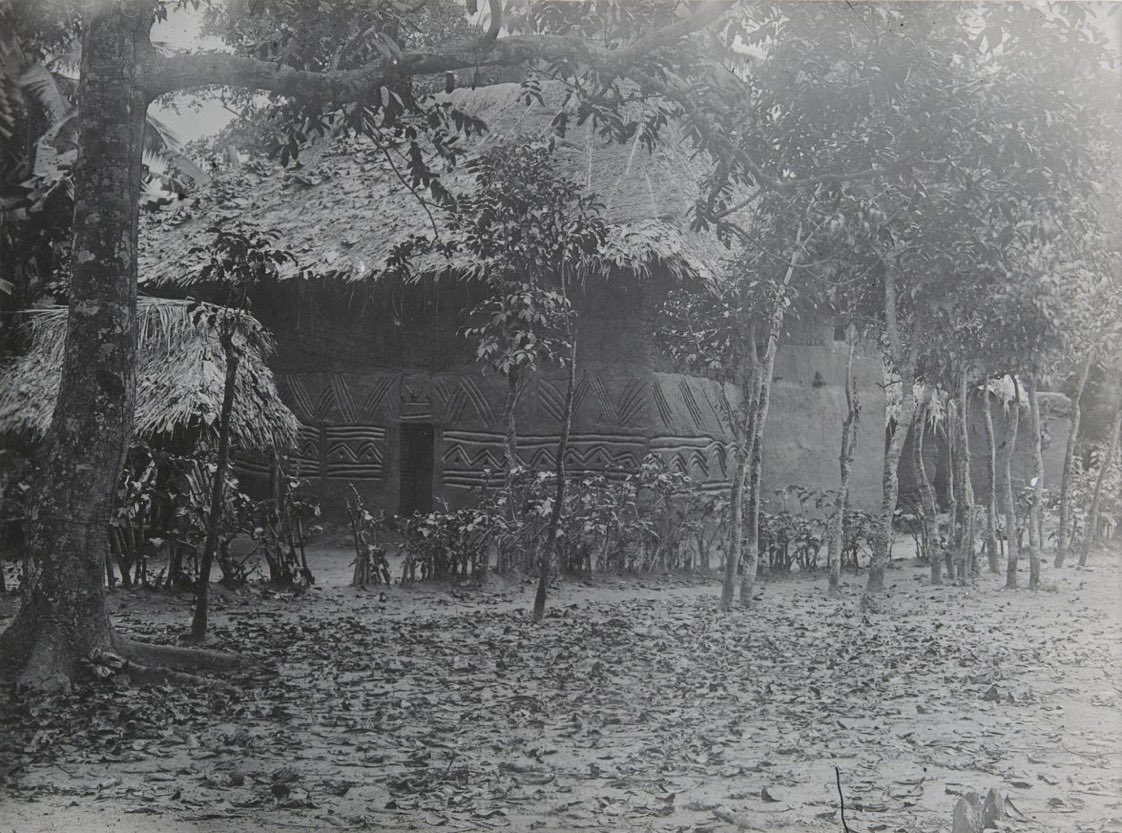
Pre-Colonial Igbo compound and Building

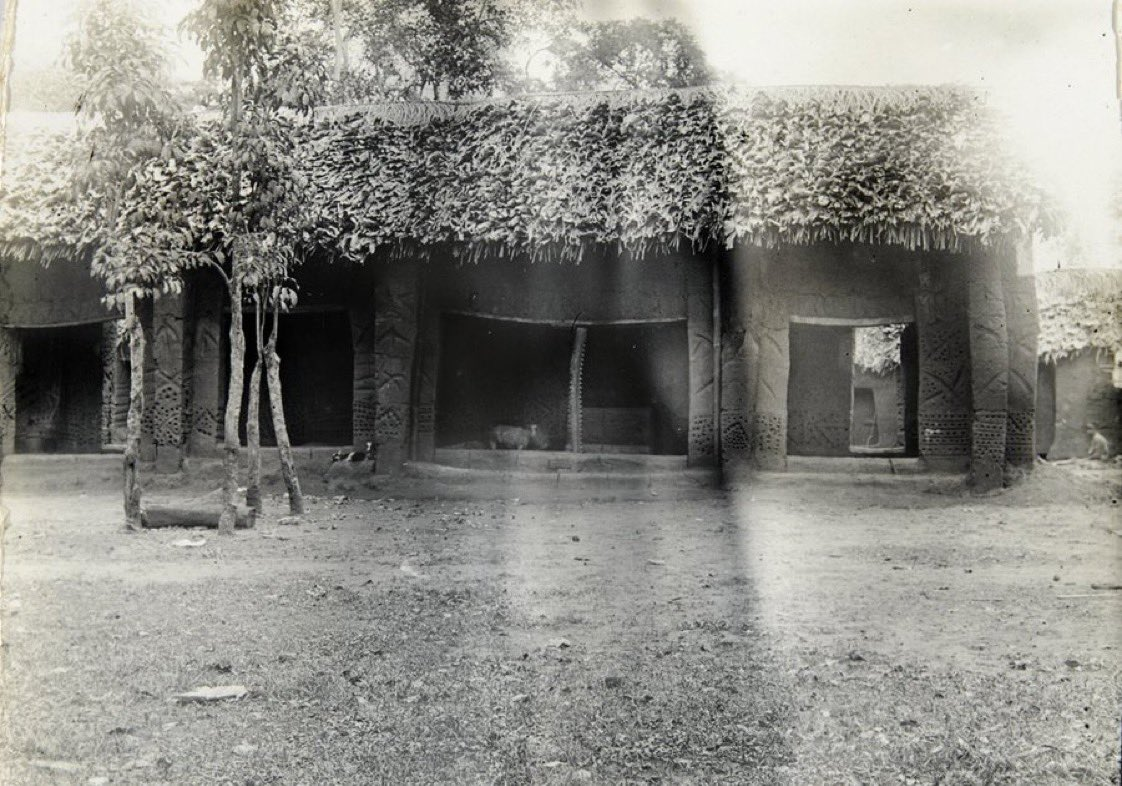
Igbo Thatched Architecture Exterior

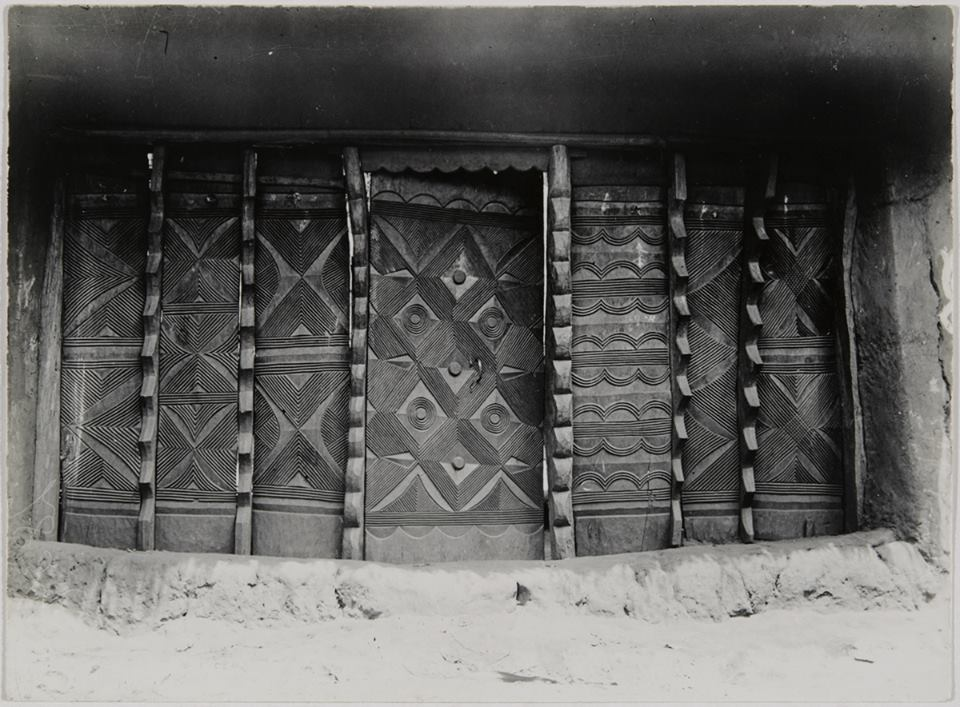
An entrance to a compound in Agukwu Nri (Anambra). Photographed by Northcote Thomas

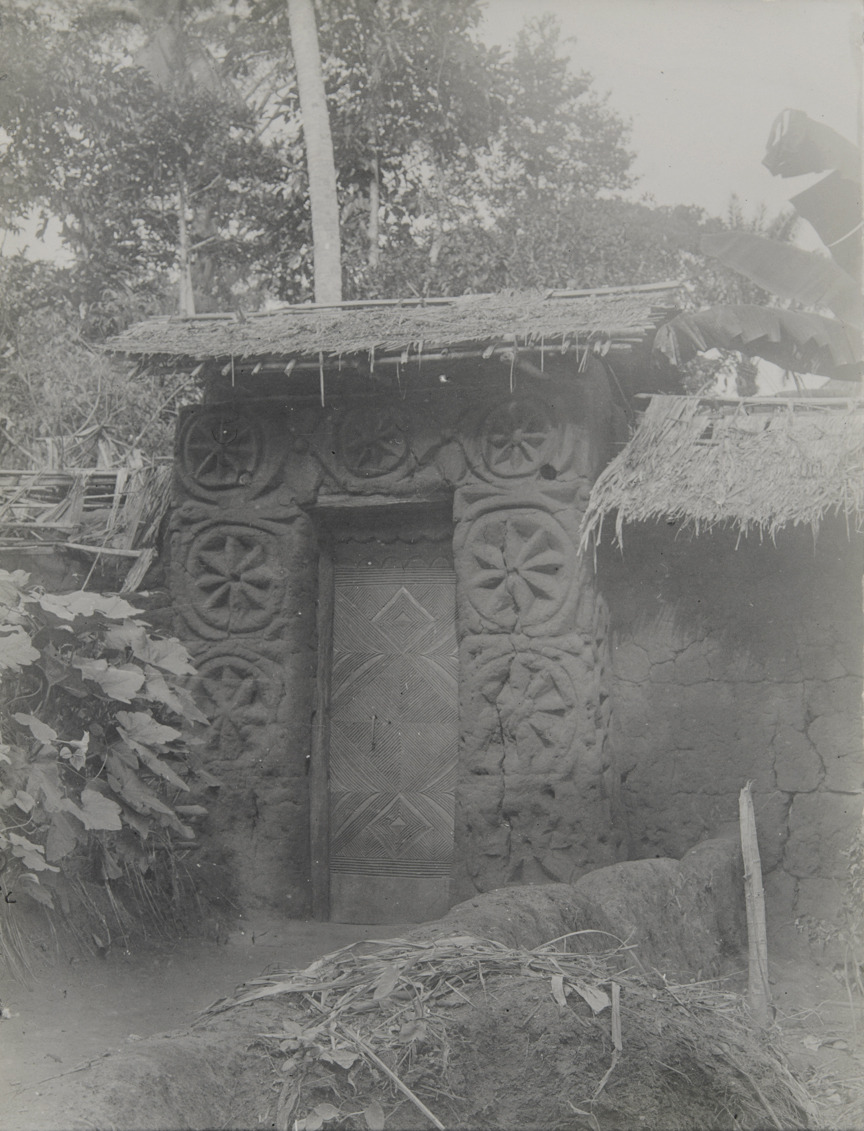
An Igbo compound entrance, in or near Önïcha. Photographed by Herbert Wimberley

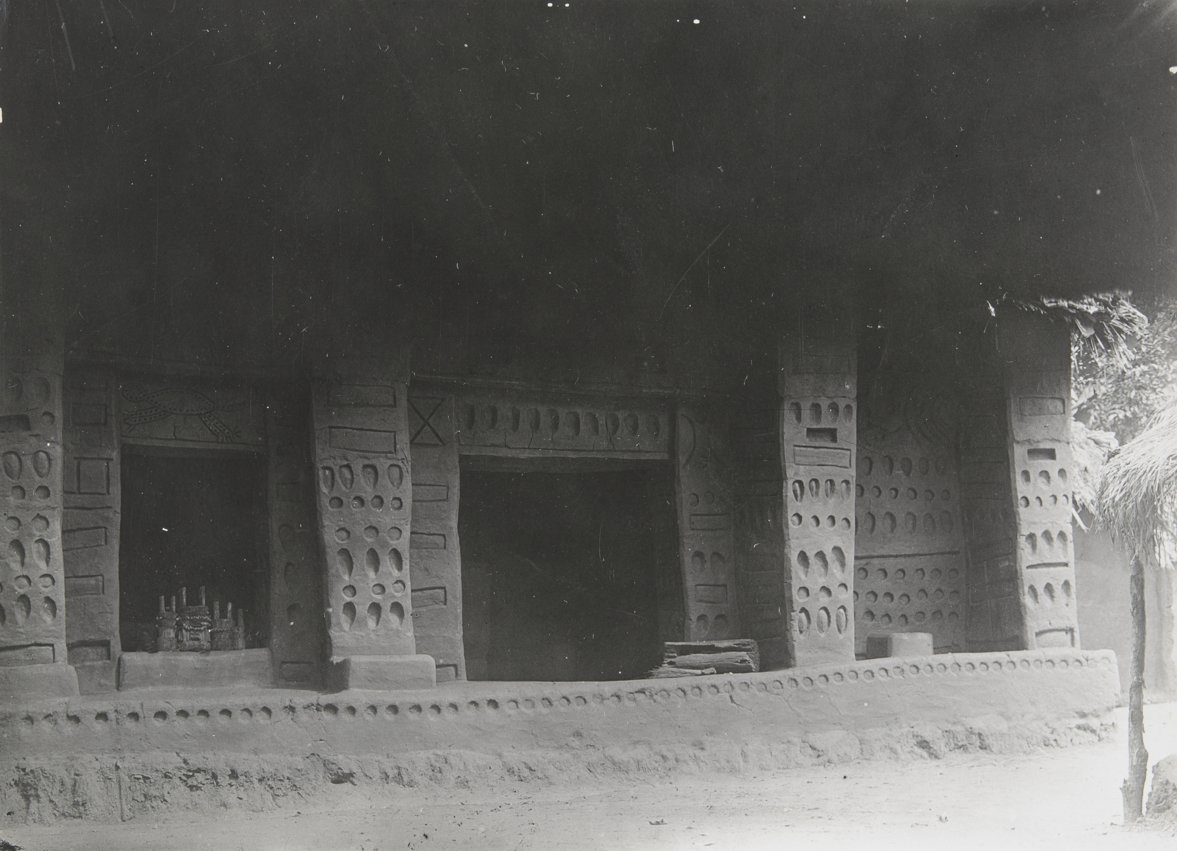
A decorated wall, possibly of a house

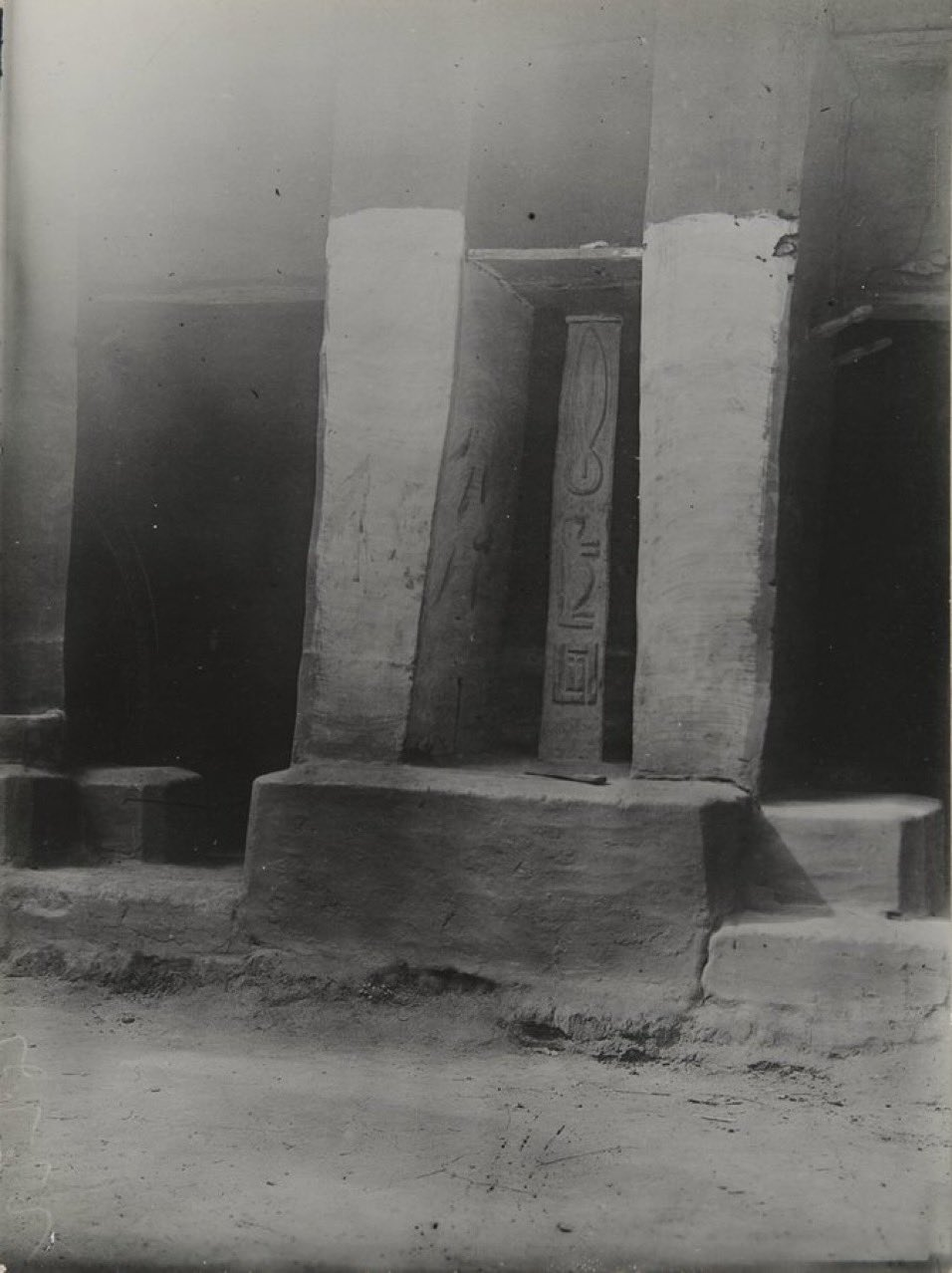
Igbo external Architectural design

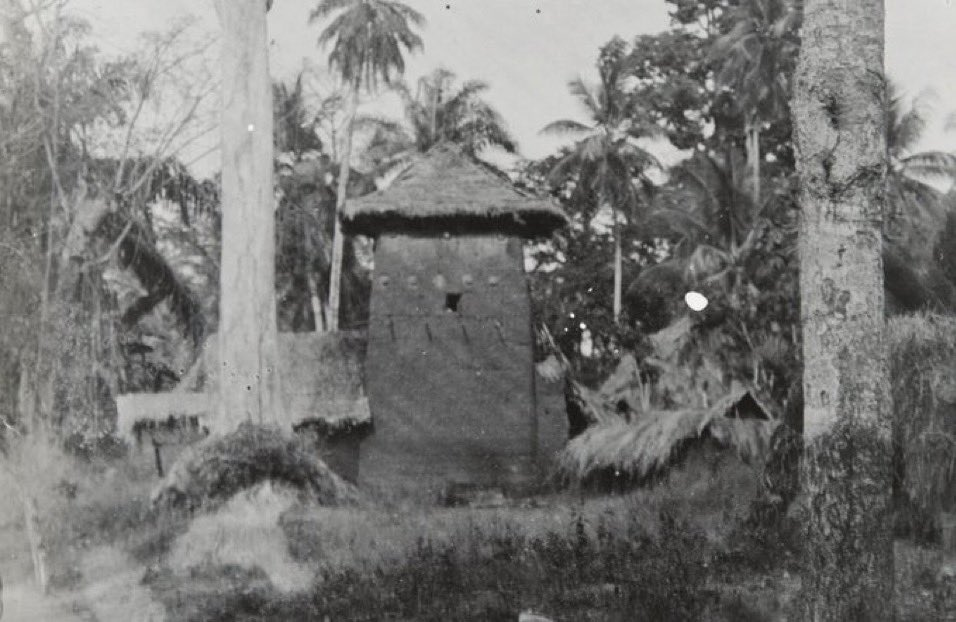
Okoli ijeoma ada war tower

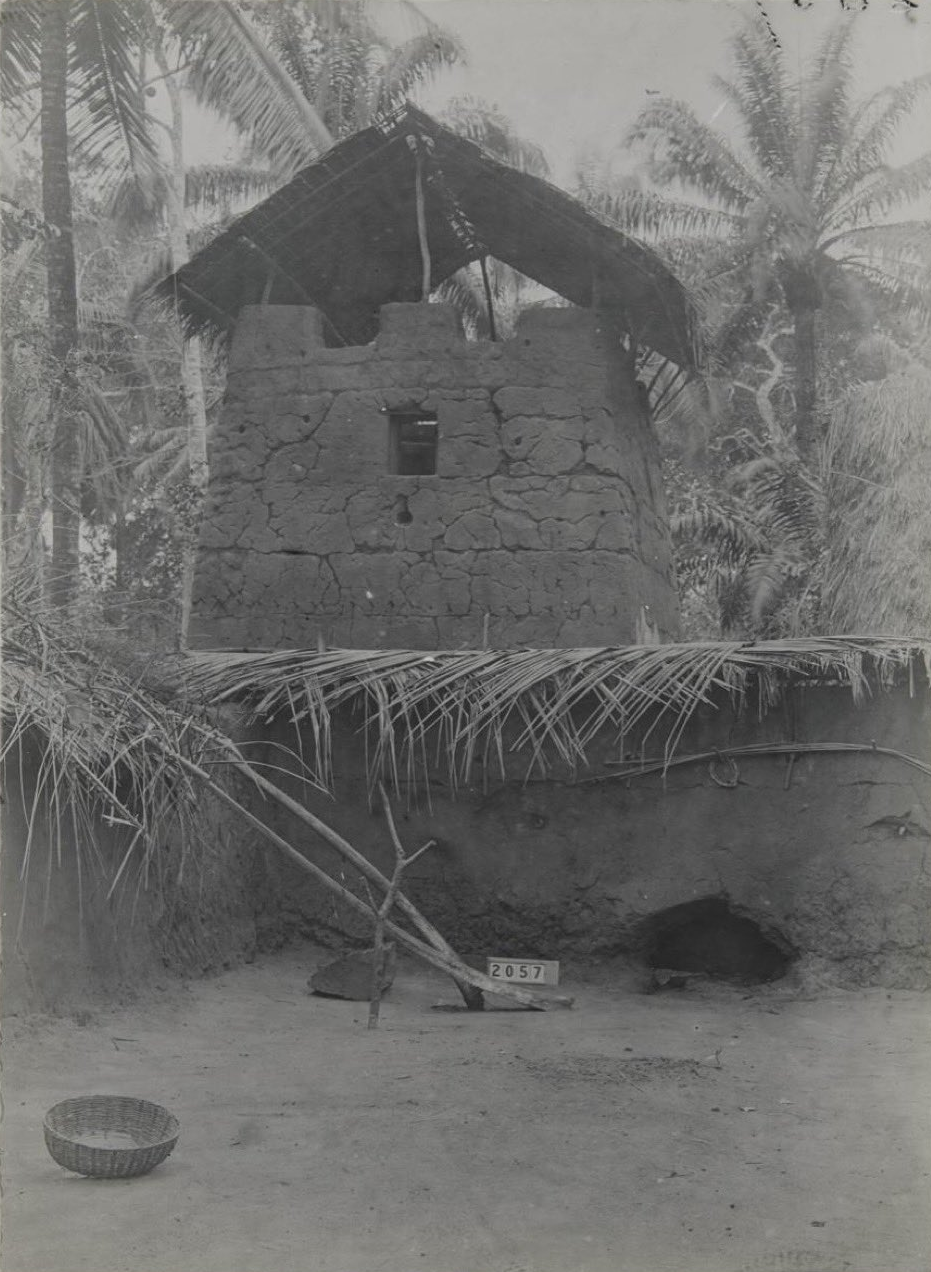
Awka watch tower

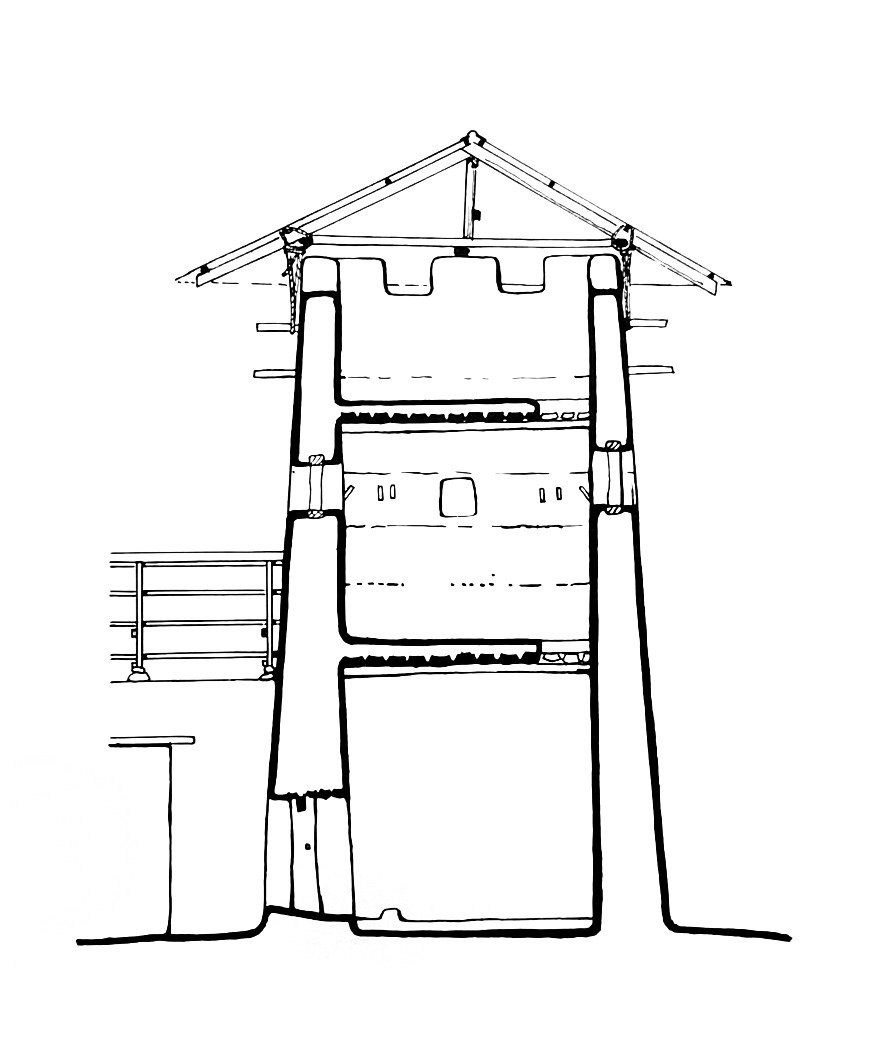
Architectural design of igbo War-towers, multi-storey buildings

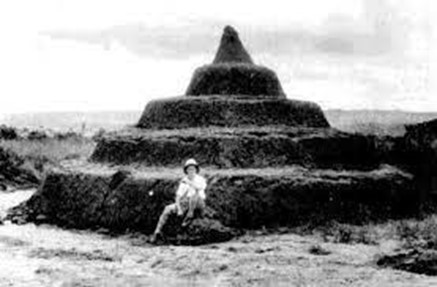
Nsude Pyramid

== Compounds (Ǹgwùlù/Ǹgwùrù) ==
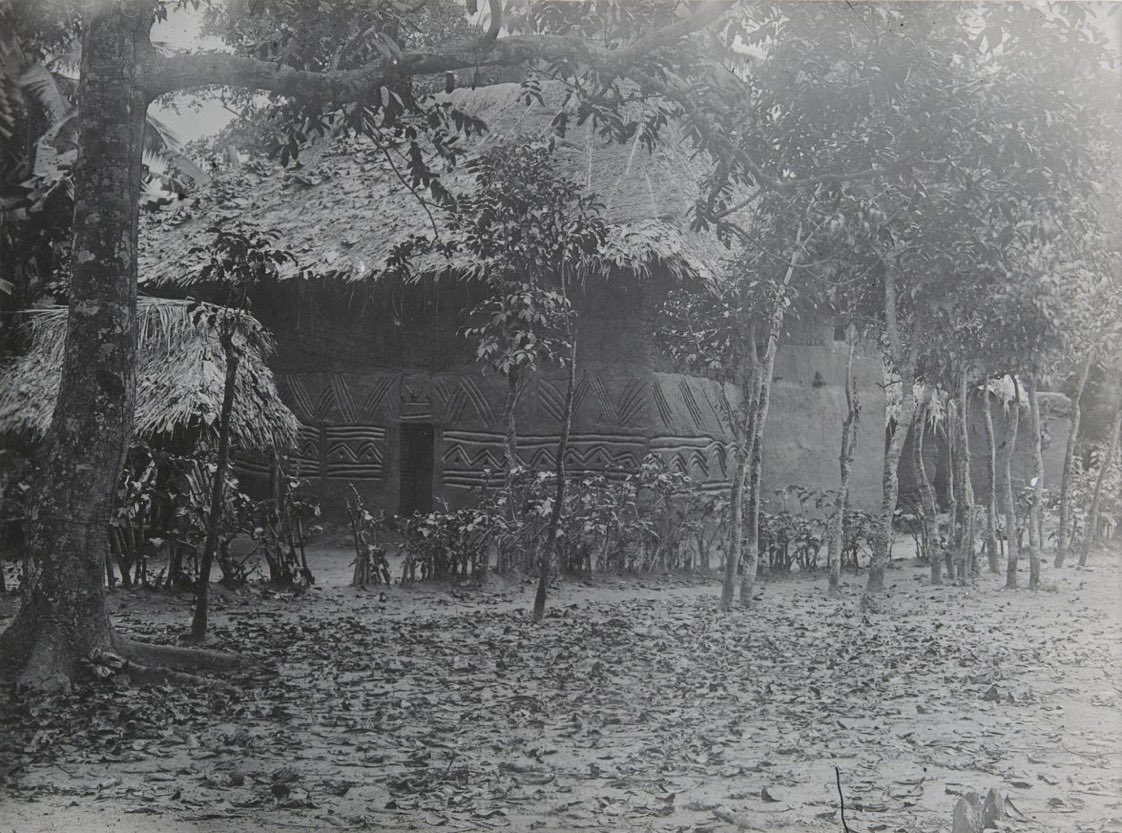
Pre-Colonial Igbo compound and Building

Igbo compound spatial organizations are organized in ways that reflect the cultural, social, and architectural traditions of the Igbo people. The compounds are often arranged in a way that allows for communal living which fosters family bonds and support. It also comprises sections of housing units or quarters reserved for members of the family i.e. a wife or wives, In-laws, and other members of the extended family. Spatial organization in Igbo compounds varies since its arrangements are dictated by the social status and professions of the owner. Wealthy compound owners often marry multiple wives with multiple children evidenced by how many quarters are in a compound. Another way spatial organization in Igbo compound varies is by the material items for building homes within the compound which cannot always be found in every region. Several identifiers of Igbo compounds include gardens (some with water features like ponds), barns, central courtyards, religious alters or shrine. Compounds in Igbo communities are also one of the ways in which Igbo ethnic subgroups and clans form.

The aggregation of these compounds constitutes family groups known as kindred or umunna (meaning “the children of our father, the progenitor of that lineage, family group, or kindred”). Multiple umunnas form the village or quarter. The quarters aggregate to form the town, clan, or village group.

Entrance

The entrance to a compound In traditional Igbo architecture serves as the entrance between the outside and the inside of the structures but it also holds cultural symbolic significance. The design of the entrance is at times carefully considered to reflect the status of the family, community residing within the compound.

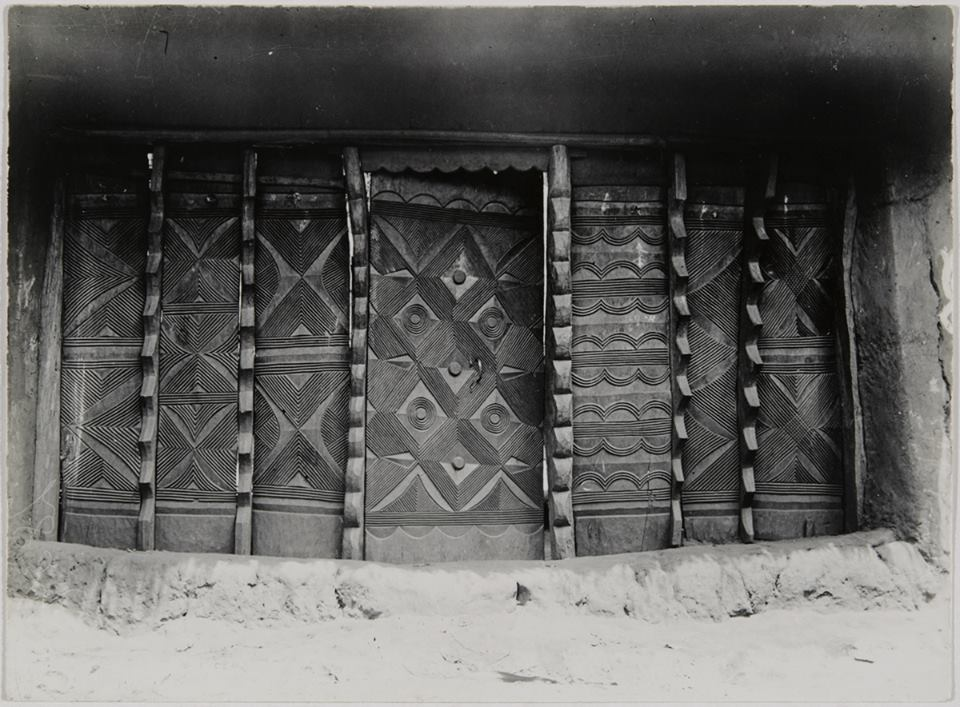
An entrance to a compound in Agukwu Nri (Anambra)

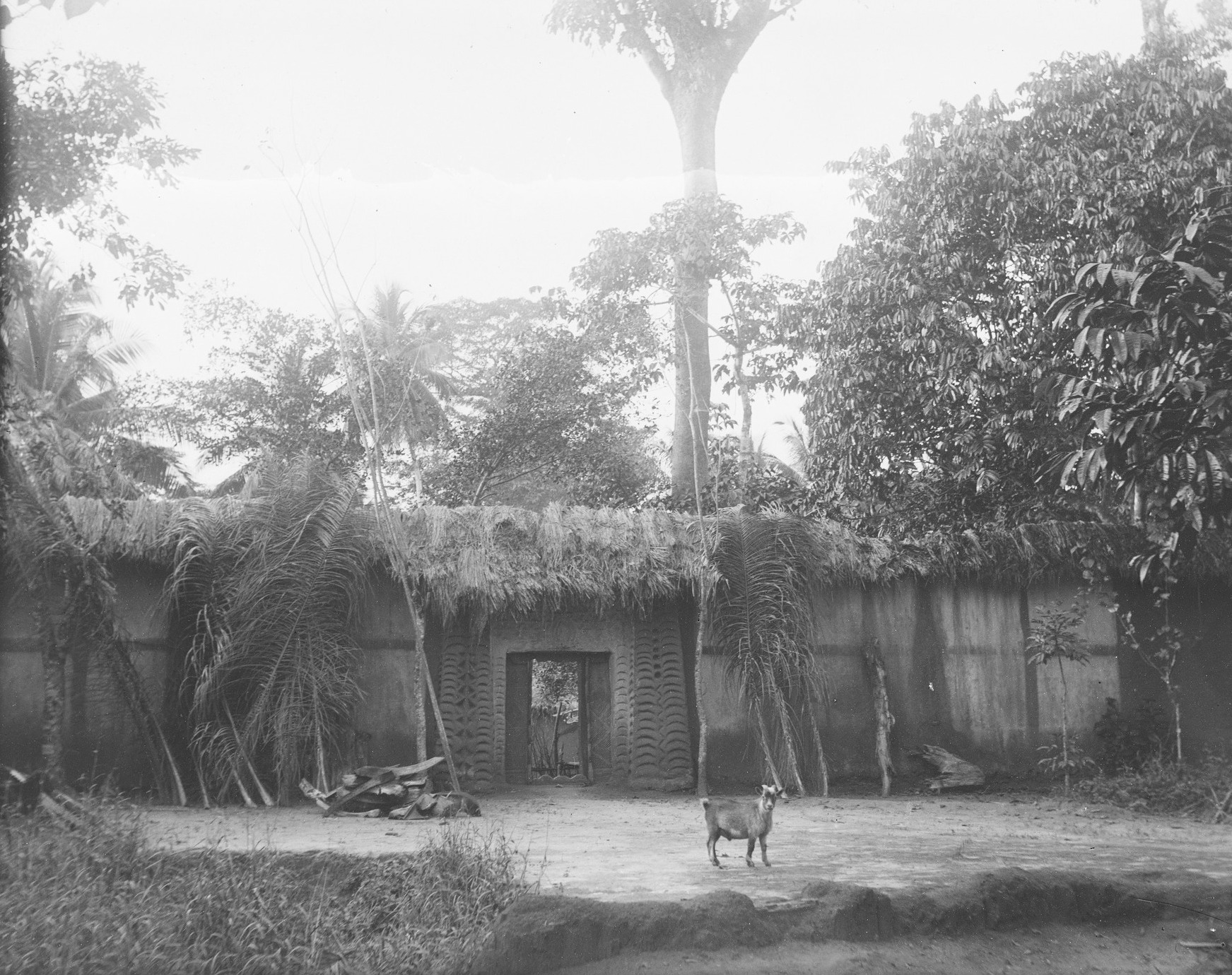
An Igbo compound entrance, in or near Önïtsha. Photographed by Herbert Wimberley

General characteristics of Igbo compound entrances include carved doors or gateways igbo compound entrances are typically marked by gateways that serve as the main points of entry and exit. These gateways can vary in size or complexity, from simple wooden gates to more elaborately decorated entrances. In certain places in Igboland compounds with grand gateways are surrounded by a high wall often for protective reasons and are made of earth locally known as aja ngwuru or egwe Such compound walls often have wooden panels which are colored and carved and a large gate known as mgbo ezi. Carved gates or doorways are usually made for titled people. Decorative Elements is used in many Igbo compound entrances they feature intricate and decorative carvings or motifs. These decorations have symbolic significance and may represent ancestral spirits, animals, historical events, or other cultural symbols. Some entrances have statues or guarding figures placed on either side of the gateway, serving as guardian protectors of the compound. These figures can be both decorative and symbolic, representing ancestral deities or used to signify a specific event important to the people who live within the compound. Traditional Igbo compounds often have thatched roofs, and the entrance may be covered by a thatched roof or awning. This provides shelter from rain and sun and other element while protecting the entrance. The entrances to many traditional Igbo compounds have low doorways, which require people to stoop or bow when entering or leaving. This physical gesture is a sign of respect and humility. The Igbo compounds are typically organized around a central courtyard, and the entrance often leads directly into this open space. The courtyard serves as a communal area for various activities and gatherings. The entrance area is often considered a symbolic threshold between the external world and the private sacred space of the compound. Rituals and ceremonies may take place at the entrance to mark important life events or transitions. The entrance area holds spiritual significance, as it is sometimes associated with ritual offerings, and prayers to honor ancestors to protect the household. The entrances are constructed using locally sourced materials, such as wood, mud, thatch, and woven palm fronds. These materials are both functional and culturally significant.

== Wall/Fences and Moats (aja Ǹgwùlù/Ǹgwùrù) ==
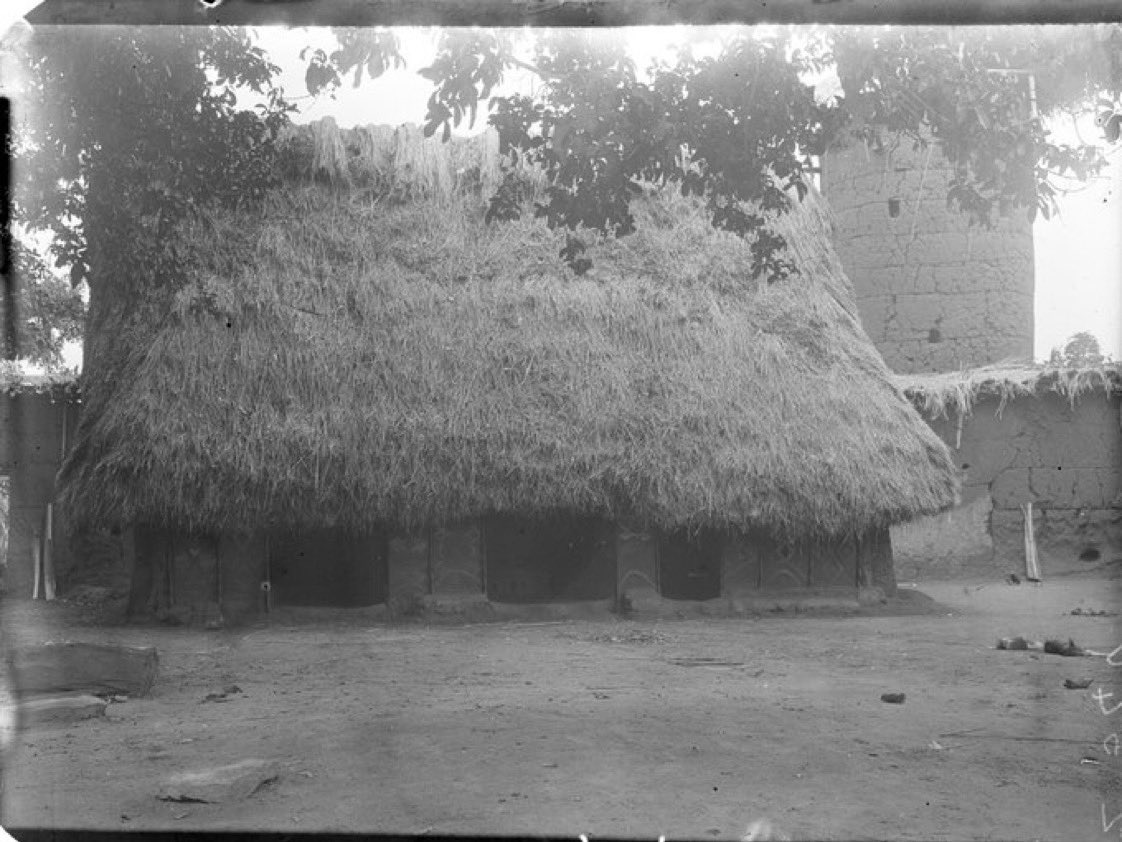
Pre-colonial Igbo house with Tower behind.

The usage of fences (aja ǹgwùlù) in Igbo architecture is often for security fortification and demarcative reasons. Some fences in Igbo architecture include living fences that are made of plants or hedges these plants provide shade and even shelter from the sun. This can be very important in the hot and humid climate which encompasses most of the region. These living fences can also be economical since they can be made of certain plants that can yield crops or items that can be sold. Fences in Igbo architecture vary but can also include moats, ditches/trenches (Olulu) with walls sometimes attached to defensive towers known as Obuna Enu.

Each master of a family has a large square piece of ground, surrounded with a moat or fence, or enclosed with a wall made of red earth tempered; which, when dry, is as hard as brick.

Walls surrounding Igbo compounds are typically made of mud, clay, bamboo, palm fronds, and sometimes stones. These walls provide security and privacy for the residents these walls also provide controlled access to the properties of the compound. Decorative motifs such as carvings and the usage of uli may be incorporated into the walls.

== Thatched Buildings (ụlọ àkanya/Ílò/aju) ==
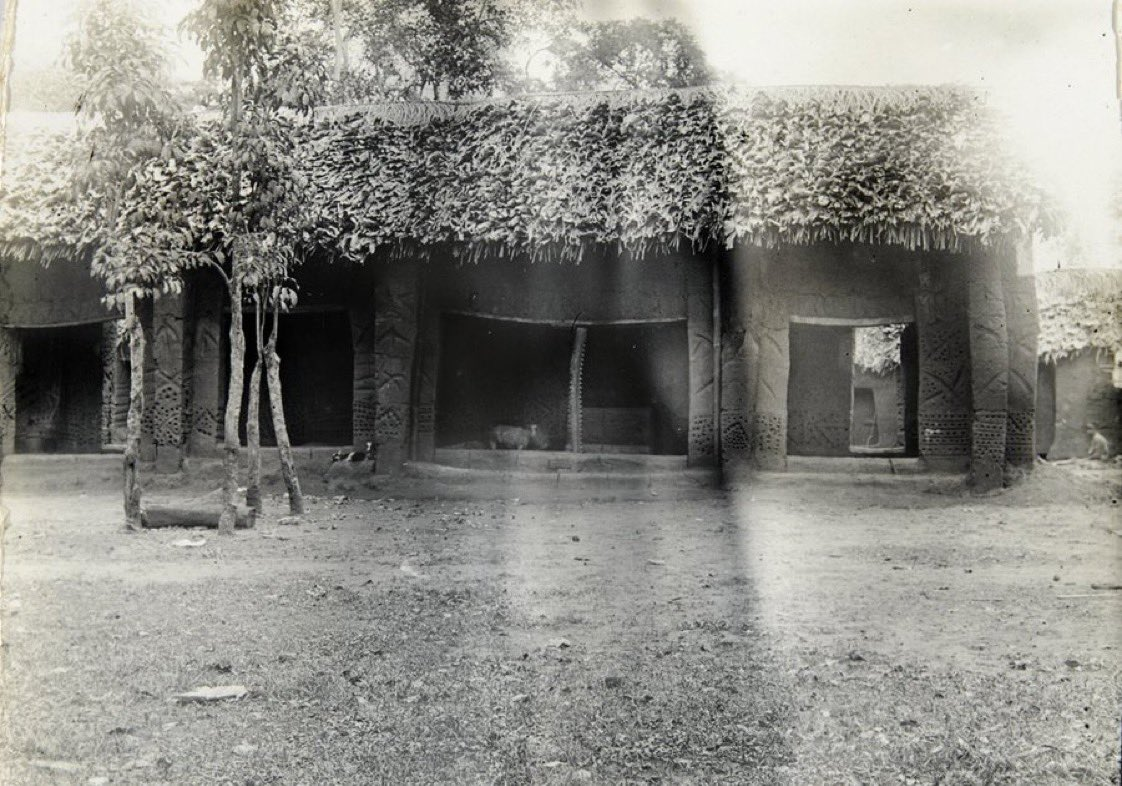
Igbo Thatched Architecture Exterior

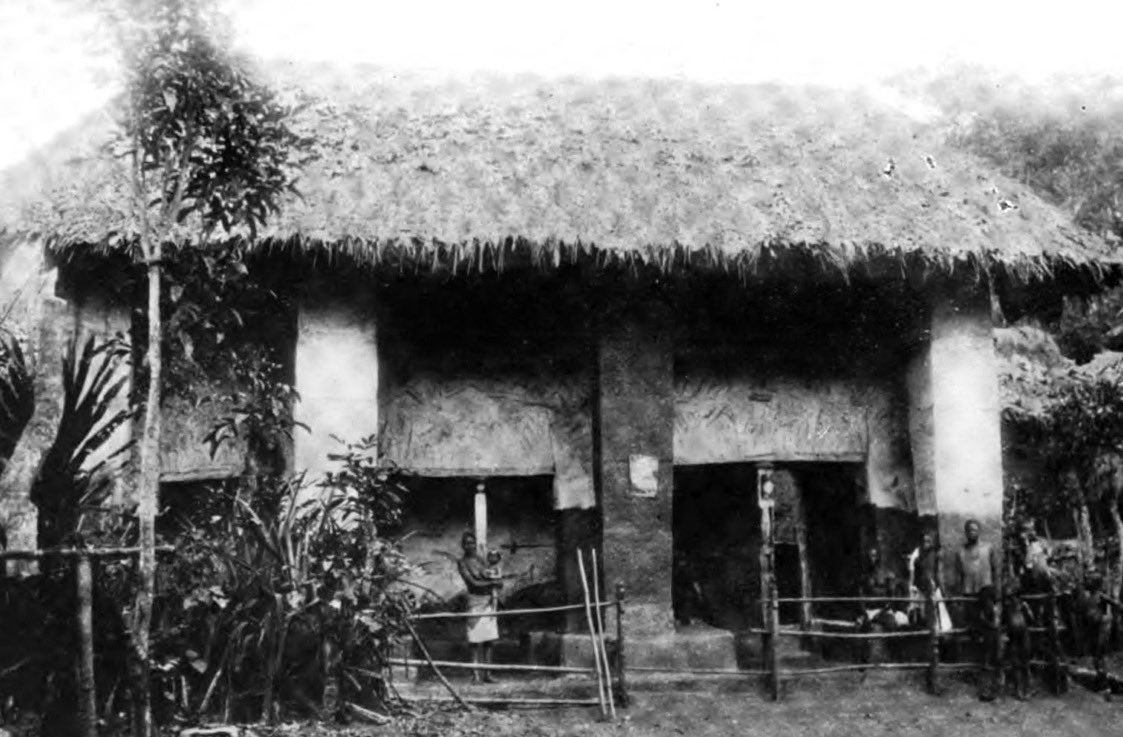
A traditional igbo building palm Thatching

Thatch is utilized in Igbo architecture and it is the main traditional roofing method. Materials used in thatching include grass, palm leaves, or reeds, which are layered and woven onto the roof frame to create the thatched roof and bamboo. The thatching is done in a way that allows for proper drainage and ventilation. Thatching requires skills and the know-how to ensure that the roof is water-resistant and can withstand the elements. Thatchers may use a variety of techniques, including bundling, weaving, and tying the thatching materials in place. Thatching is a common feature in traditional Igbo architecture it is utilized on fences, gateways, and buildings.

Thatched buildings in Igbo architecture are designed with materials that are common within the region such as mud and clay which are fundamental building materials in Igbo architecture. They are used for constructing the foundations of buildings walls floors and occasionally roofs. Mud and clay are readily available since they are a common material and they also provide insulation against heat. Mud and clay are also mixed with sand and silt giving the building materials strength while also adding a resistance to water damage. Wood used for support structure this includes beams and columns. Wood especially hardwood in Igbo architecture are often carved such as columns or doors to create decorative elements and can be sourced locally from forests. Rocks (stones/Pebbles) are used for the foundations and, in certain cases they were used for building walls. Stones were also used in paving compounds and floors in buildings. Pebbles (aja iyi) in certain cases were also imperative in Igbo architecture.

== Nsude pyramid shrines ==
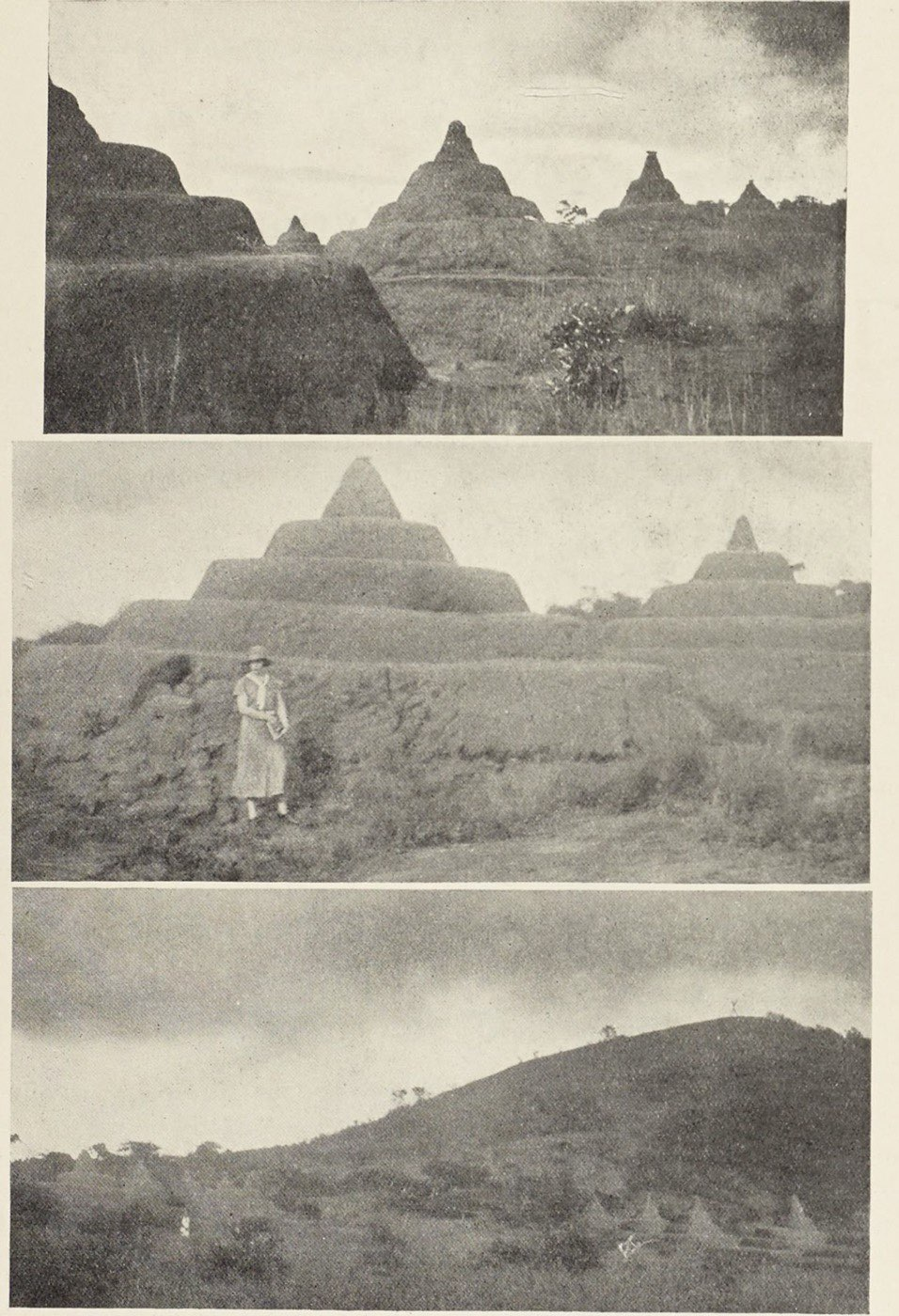
Multiple Nsude Pyramids.

The Nsude pyramid shrines are pyramidal shrines located in Nsude, a village in southeastern Nigeria.

These are structures that were constructed by the Igbo and are made of earth and clay. The anthropologist and colonial administrator G.I. Jones took photos of the pyramids when he saw them in 1935. Over time, the Nsude Pyramids experienced erosion and degradation due to their earthen construction and exposure to the elements. Today, only remnants remain.

Ten pyramidal structures were built of clay/mud. The first base section was 60 ft (18 m) in circumference and 3 ft (0.91 m) in height. The next stack was 45 ft (14 m) in circumference.

Originally, there were 10 pyramids in total, arranged in a circular pattern with a central open space. The largest pyramid was located at the center, surrounded by smaller ones. The arrangement of the pyramids is thought to have had symbolic and ritualistic significance.

== Mbari ==
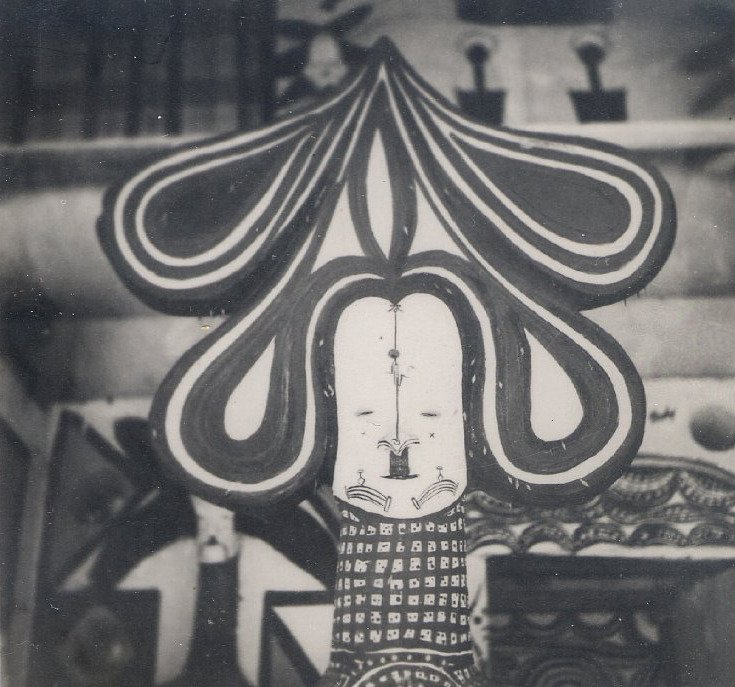
Mbari figure near Owere. British Museum, c. 1930s

Mbari is a visual art form practiced by the Igbo people in southeast Nigeria consisting of a sacred two-story house constructed as a propitiatory rite. Mbari houses of the Owerri-Igbo, which are large opened-sided square planned shelters contain many life-sized, painted figures (sculpted in mud to appease the Alusi (deity) and Ala, the earth goddess, with other deities of thunder and water). Mbari houses are made as a gift to Ala, as a way to acknowledge Ala's charitable and overarching presence. Some Mbari houses are dedicated strictly and solely to Ala. Sometimes, however, other gods are represented along with Ala in the structure. Other sculptures which could be included are of officials, craftsmen, foreigners (mainly Europeans), animals, legendary creatures and ancestors. Mbari houses take years to build and building them is regarded as sacred. Along with being representations of abundance and harmony, they are most usually created during times of peace and stability. A ceremony is performed within the structure for a gathering of town leaders. After the ritual is complete, going in or even looking at the Mbari house is considered taboo. Mbari are public shrine galleries where complex characters of Igbo mythology, folklore, and society are fleshed out in termite earth.
