= Igbere =

- City
- Location in Nigeria
- Coordinates: 5.708654°N 7.652571°E
- Country: Nigeria
- Time zone: UTC+1 (WAT)

Igbere is a suburban town in Bende local government area of Abia State of the South-Eastern geopolitical region Nigeria. Also popularly known and referred to as the Igbere Ebiri, the town is the core "part of Old-Bende Division of the former Eastern Nigeria". The people of Igbere, relating to, or characteristic of Igbere or its inhabitants and heritage are called Igberian.

== Igbere Autonomous Communities ==
Igbere consists of 13 autonomous communities, namely Amakpo, Amankalu, Amaiyi, Amaoji, Amaofufe, Amaukwu, Agbo, Eziama, Ibinanta, Ibina-ukwu, Okafia, Ohumola and Umusi. These autonomous communities make up the great Igbere clan. Each community is governed by a king and the entire clan is governed traditionally by the Igbere Clan Council of Kings (Ndi Eze).

== Geographical Location ==
Igbere is located 106 kilometres (66 miles) from Aba, the Commercial Hub of Abia State, approximately 171 kilometres (106 miles) from the Port Harcourt Airport, 106 kilometres (66 miles) from Owerri, 42 kilometres (26 miles) from Umuahia, the Capital City of Abia State, 19 kilometres (12 miles) from Uzuakoli, 6.4 kilometres (4 miles) to Abriba and 29 kilometres (18 miles) to Ohafia.

== Ethnic Igbo ==
Igbere is one of the major clans of the Igbo ethnic group in present-day Nigeria. The Igbere people speak a certain dialect of the Igbo language also referred to as Igbere. Igbere town has a land border with the following towns: Alayi, Item, Umuhu and Ozuitem (all in Bende local government area) and Abiriba in Ohafia local government area) of Abia State. These towns share similar traditions, though there are minor dialectic difference in language.

Just like many Igbo communities in Igboland, each king has a council of chiefs who form part of the king's cabinet and help in running and administering the community. The decision of the king in most sensitive matters is still subject to the decision of councils. Such councils may be derived from the Igbere Age-Grade system. one of the core traditions of Igbere people.

== Culture ==
=== Igbere age grade system ===
"The Age Grade system in Igbere Clan is the vehicle of development. It is through the developmental effort of the Age Grades that Ulo Nkuma, Heath Centres, Culverts, Schools, Civic Centres, Bridges and Roads were built," Chief Solo U. Akuma (SAN) wrote in his address titled "Re-inventing Our Grades" (2008).

The age grade system as practised in Igbere from time immemorial is a convenient way for the development and security of Igbere territory. "Before now, age grades formed major part of vigilante that were used to guard Igbere land both day and night to insure the safety of lives and properties of the people. More so, the age grade is a socio-cultural organization whose role includes upholding the cultures and values of the community that were handed down from one generation to another."

The age grade system as practiced by the Igbere people is as old as the clan itself. However, based on records available, the list of Age Grades that existed within the last 100 years.

=== Ezumezu Festival ===
The Ezumezu Festival affords the can the opportunity and privilege to remove or retire the oldest age grade who served the clan meritoriously from communal service; this is called traditional retirement ceremony.

On the other hand, to recognise a new Age Grade is called Outing/Naming of a New Age Grade. The occasion is also used to raise funds for the development of the clan.

=== Traditional retirement ===
The Igbere kingdom defence system is run by certain age groups, as are other functions. Taxes used for executing projects are collected along such age-grade groups as well as other social works.

In the community, there are general work such as the clearing of farm roads, building of public toilets, sweeping the civic centers, going to harvest a collectively (such as palm-plantation) and so many work that involved the use of farm tools such as cutlass and hoes. All these are collectively done by all age-grades.

But once a person retires, it means the person has come of age and would need to be exempted from all such works and also to lay down the working tools which is symbolized by a ‘CUTLASS AND A HOE’ literally referred to as ‘Laying down the Cutlass’ ( Igbotomma) which is also popularly known as Traditional Retirement.

- "Traditional Retirement is equivalent to thanksgiving. Each retiree puts a canopy, cook food, hires musician or DJ for music and celebrate with friends and relatives. And in return, people give gifts, money etc to the Retiree to support them in their new age because they are now expected to work less and not go to distant farm lands."
- After the retirement, the retiree ceases to do the general work, and exempted from taxes, levies and so many activities of the kingdom.

== Notable people ==
- Abai Ikwechegh (1923–2020), jurist.
- Chief Solo Akuma, MON (a Senior Advocate of Nigeria and former Attorney General of Abia State, 2005-2007)
- Orji Uzor Kalu (current Senator representing Abia North Senatorial Zone in the Nigerian Senate and a former governor of Abia State - 1999 to 2007)
- Victor Ifegwu-Mbonu (President/Founder, Double Edged Impact Network and The Emerge Club Africa)
- Chimaobi Desmond Anyaso (Nigerian businessman, investor, philanthropist and political figure)
