= Senator Pollock (disambiguation) =

William P. Pollock (1870–1922) was a U.S. Senator from South Carolina from 1918 to 1919.

Senator Pollock may also refer to:

- Henry W. Pollock (1878–1954), New York State Senate
- Howard Wallace Pollock (1920–2011), Alaska State Senate
- James Pollock (Northern Ireland politician) (1893–1982), Northern Irish Senate
