= District officer =

British colonial administrator

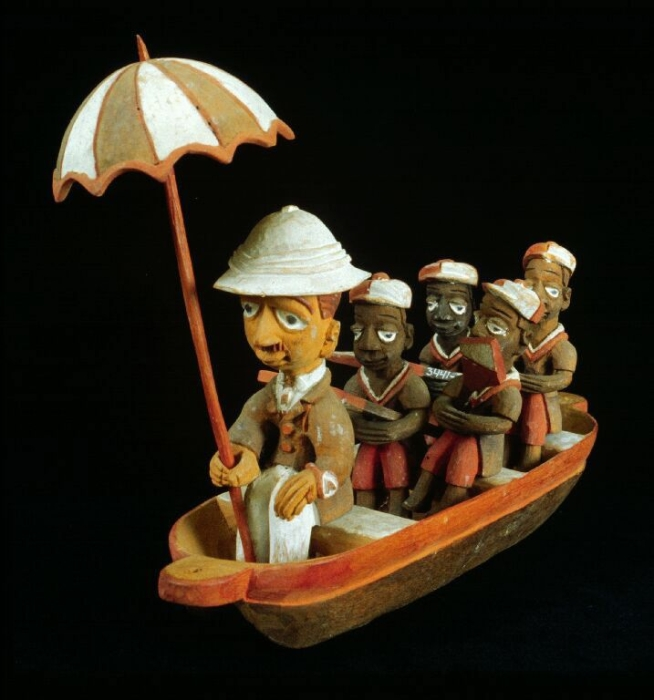
A Nigerian sculpture showing a District Officer on "tour" of his district, c. 1930

The District Officer (abbreviated to D.O.) was a commissioned officer of one of the colonial governments of the British Empire, from the mid-1930s also a member of the Colonial Service of the United Kingdom, who was responsible for a District of one of the overseas territories of the Empire.

== Role ==
The district officer was an administrator and often also a magistrate and was the link between the professional and technical services of the colonial government and the people of his district. He was at the heart of colonial administration throughout most of the British Empire, although not in British India, where the same functions were carried out by members of the Indian Civil Service, nor in the self-governing Dominions.

District Officers wore uniforms, according to the climate, but their formal tunic with gold braid was usually reserved for ceremonial occasions.

Until the 1930s, each overseas possession had its own administrative service, and prospective District Officers needed to apply to one or more of them. Once in post, an officer wishing to transfer to another colony or British protectorate had to make a new application to its government. However, in the 1930s a unified Colonial Service was created, with a number of sub-services, and each of its officers was a member of the civil service of a particular territory and also of one of the sub-services of the Colonial Service managed by the Colonial Office, based in Whitehall.

== Career progression ==
Before being appointed, a candidate was first a District Officer Cadet, undergoing a rigorous training, and was then promoted to Assistant District Officer, usually after two years of successful probation and after passing examinations. On being appointed as a District Officer, he took on the administration of a District, usually in the territory of the Empire where he was.

Because of the number of districts, many District Officers remained in the same role until leaving the Colonial Service. If they were promoted, they became first District Commissioners, then Provincial Commissioners. Some rose to the pinnacle of being colonial Governors, although men were also appointed as Governors whose previous careers had been in other services. In particular, the Governors of Hong Kong, Gibraltar, Malta, and Bermuda were almost invariably senior British Army or Royal Navy officers.

== Notable District Officers ==
- Sir Reginald Fleming Johnston (1874–1938) a District of Weihaiwei, later a tutor to the former Emperor Puyi
- Sir Colin Allan (1921–1993), a New Zealander who was a District Officer in the Solomon Islands and later Governor of the Seychelles
- Reginald Applin (1869–1957), a District Officer of the North Borneo Chartered Company, later a Conservative member of parliament
- William R. Bell (1876–1927), Australian-born District Officer of Malaita in the British Solomon Islands
- Ian Blelloch (1901–1982), a District Officer in Malaya
- Sir Jack Boles (1925–2013), a District Officer and District Commissioner in North Borneo, later Director-General of the National Trust
- Anastasios Christodoulou (1932–2002), a District Officer in Tanganyika, later Secretary General of the Association of Commonwealth Universities
- Oscar Cook (1888–1952), a District Officer in North Borneo, later a writer
- Sir Douglas Hall, 14th Baronet (1909–2004), a District Officer in Africa, later Governor of British Somaliland
- Edwin Richard Hallifax (1874–1950), a District Officer in Hong Kong, later acting Colonial Secretary
- Mark Herdman (1932–2015), a District Officer in Kenya, later Governor of the British Virgin Islands
- Tom Iremonger (1916–1998), a District Officer in the Western Pacific, later a Conservative member of parliament
- Gwilliam Iwan Jones (1904–1995), a District Officer in Bende, Nigeria
- Sir Donald Luddington (1920–2009), a District Officer in Hong Kong, later High Commissioner for the Western Pacific and Governor of the Solomon Islands
- Sir Foley Newns (1909–1998), a District Officer in Nigeria, later Cabinet Secretary
- Sir James Pollock (1883–1982), a District Officer in Ramallah, later District Commissioner for Jerusalem and Northern Ireland Senator
- Victor Purcell (1896–1965), a District Officer on Christmas Island, later an academic
- Tunku Abdul Rahman (1903–1990), a District Officer of Kedah, later Prime Minister of Malaya and of Malaysia
- Jerome Udoji (1912–2010), a District Officer in Nigeria, becoming the first African to be appointed in the Colonial Service, later Nigerian Minister of Finance
- Sir Donald Tsang, a District Officer in Hong Kong, later the Chief Executive of Hong Kong
- Harry Graham Willis (1875–1943), a District Officer, later Provincial Commissioner, in Rhodesia
- Keith Wookey (1912–1963), a District Officer and later Resident in North Borneo

== See also ==
- Sanders of the River (a film of 1935 about a District Commissioner in Nigeria)
- The Scarlet Spear (a film of 1954 about a District Officer in Africa)
- Pacific Destiny (a film of 1956 about a District Officer Cadet in Oceania)
