= Foley Newns =

Sir Alfred Foley Francis Polden Newns KCMG CVO (30 January 1909 – 21 June 1998) was a member of the Colonial Service from 1932 to 1971. His name appears as one of five "Architects of Departmental Systems".

== Education ==
Foley was born in London into a missionary family. His father, the Rev Alfred Newns, was an Anglican clergyman who spent much of his life working in Montserrat and Antigua. Newns attended Mercers' School (Holborn), Christ's Hospital, and St Catharine's College, Cambridge.

== Colonial Administrator ==
While studying at Cambridge he decided to apply to the Colonial Administrative Service (CAS). The job of colonial administrator was an attractive prospect for young men who sought both adventure and public service in the far flung outposts of Empire. In Newns's words, "It was looked upon as a plum job much in demand".

=== Nigeria ===
After a year's course on "Tropical African Services" at Cambridge, Newns was appointed to Nigeria in 1932. He was posted to South Eastern Nigeria and worked as an Assistant District Officer. His first post as District Officer was at Bende, Nigeria. He spent 17 years working in district administration and served under some of the greatest Colonial Governors of his era, including Sir Donald Cameron, Sir Bernard Bourdillon, and Sir Arthur Richards. In 1949, he moved to the Secretariat in Lagos.

Newns spent over a third of his life in Africa, the continent which became his spiritual home. He abhorred all forms of racial prejudice, and counted numerous African leaders and academics among his very closest friends. These included Simeon Adebo, and Sir Milton Margai, the first Prime Minister of independent Sierra Leone. Newns was devastated by the assassination in 1966 of his friend Sir Abubakar Tafawa Balewa, Prime Minister of Nigeria, with whom he had worked closely during the constitutional preparations for Nigerian independence. He believed Tafawa Balewa's death to be not only a great tragedy for the people of Nigeria but also a huge blow to peaceful political change across the newly independent African continent.

Newns was closely involved in the transformation of Nigeria from a British colony into an independent state. He was responsible for introducing the system of cabinet government in Nigeria and Sierra Leone, and his methods were later copied throughout British Africa in the final years of colonial rule.

=== Sierra Leone and the Bahamas ===
Newns was Acting Governor of Sierra Leone until it was granted independence in 1961, when he stayed on for two more years to advise the new African administration, before moving to the Bahamas, where he served as Secretary of the Cabinet from 1963 to 1971.

=== Knighthoods ===
For his service, Newns was made:

- a companion 3d class of the Order of St Michael and St George in June 1957;
- a knight commander of the Royal Victorian Order in December 1961; and
- a knight commander of the Order of St Michael and St George in January 1963.

== Death ==
In retirement, Newns lived in Cambridge, where he died on 21 June 1998.

== Publications ==
- Newns, AFFP. 1935 (Intelligence report on the Akasaa Clan)
- Newns, AFFP. 1935 (Intelligence report on the Epie-Atissa Group)
- Newns, AFFP. 1947 (Reorganisation report on the Kalabari Clan)
- Newns, AFFP. 1949 (Report on the Corney subsidies in the Eastern Provinces)
