= Ugwueke =

- Town
- Location in Nigeria
- Coordinates: 5°44′N 7°36′E
- Country: Nigeria
- State: Abia State
- LGA: Bende Local Government Area
- Town/Village: Ugwueke Community
- Time zone: UTC+1 (West Africa Time)

Ugwueke is a village located in Bende Local Government Area in Abia State, Nigeria.

== Demographics ==
It is occupied by mostly farmers and traders. Some people from other cities visit Ugwueke for business and also to visit the Royal Cross Methodist Hospital.

== Constituencies and neighbouring areas ==
Ugwueke has the following villages surrounding it Igbere, Item, Akoli, Ozuitem, Umuhu, Isuikwuato, Alayi, and Ezeukwu. It has a road that leads from Alayi to Isieke which is the last community in Ugwueke.
