= List of people from Abia State =

The following people were all born in, residents of, or otherwise closely associated with Abia State.

== Sports ==
- Felix Anyansi-Agwu - Former Chairman of Enyimba FC and NFF Vice President.
- Samuel Chukwueze - Nigeria National Team football player.
- Michael Emenalo - Nigerian sports director and former professional footballer.
- Kenneth Josiah Omeruo - Nigerian professional footballer.

== Arts ==
- 2Shotz - AfroRap Artiste and music producer.
- Ejike Asiegbu - Nollywood veteran.
- Bright Chimezie - Highlife Musician.
- Chelsea Eze - Award-winning Nollywood actress.
- Chinedu Ikedieze - Nollywood actor.
- OC Ukeje - Lagos based Award-winning Nollywood Actor.

== Politics ==
- Ikechukwu Emetu - Nigerian engineer and politician.
- Okezie Victor Ikpeazu - Nigerian politician.
- Orji Uzor Kalu - Nigerian politician and businessman.
- Alex Otti - Nigerian economist, banker, investor, philanthropist, and politician.
- Theodore Orji - Nigerian politician.
- Chimaobi Desmond Anyaso – Nigerian businessman, investor, philanthropist and political figure
