= Amaozara =

- Village
- Location in Nigeria
- Coordinates: 5°43′48″N 7°37′10″E
- Country: Nigeria
- State: Abia State
- Local Government Area: Bende
- Time zone: UTC+1 (WAT)

Amaozara is a village located in Bende Local Government Area in Abia State, Nigeria. It is made up of four compounds: Ezi Ukwu, Ezi Egwu, Ezi Okoro and Ezi Uhu.

== Geography ==
Most of the inhabitants are farmers, traders, civil servants and bricklayers. The village has spring water and stream water. The geography of the land is very diverse, with hills, lakes, forests, and ponds.

== Culture and Economy ==
Most of the indigenous people are Christians and few are traditional worshippers. The village has a primary school. The village has its own calendar and market days (Eke, Orie, Afor, Nkwo).

== External link ==
- Amaozara at GEOnet Names Server
