= Keith Wookey =

British colonial official

- Born: Walter Keith Caple Wookey; 1 January 1912; Lincolnshire, UK
- Died: November 1963 (aged 51); United Kingdom
- Other name: W.K.C. Wookey
- Occupations: Assistant District Officer, District Officer, Resident and Senior Official of British Colonial Government of North Borneo
- Years active: 1936 to 1963
- Children: 4

Walter Keith Caple Wookey (1912 - 1963), also known as Keith Wookey, was a District Officer and later Resident in the post-war British Colonial Government of North Borneo. At some point Wookey was the most senior official stationed in Sandakan as Resident (known as Resident Commissioner in full) and was also appointed by the Queen to the Executive Council, North Borneo.

== Biography ==
=== Early life ===
Walter Keith Caple Wookey was born in Sleaford, Lincolnshire and soon after moved to Barbados Lodge, Bath, Somerset, schooled at Lewisham, Bristol, UK and went on to further his studies at Oxford. His mother, Elizabeth Walker, died in 1921 at the birth of Keith’s sister Betty. Soon, both Keith & Betty were taken to their grandparents, Francis & Alice Wookey who raised them at Stones Cross House, Somerset. On 28 June 1935 Keith joined the Royal Navy Volunteer Reserve becoming a probationary second Lieutenant 9 (UK Navy List 1935).

=== Pre-war ===
On 17 April 1936 Keith came to North Borneo as a cadet (trainee government official), joining the British North Borneo Chartered Company administrators. He arrived in Sandakan with Mr J.H. Macartney by S.S. Kajang on 18 April 1936. At the beginning of his career as a trainee government official, Keith was placed within the Secretariat, although he was also supervised most of the time by the Under Secretary. From then on, Keith transferred from various branches of Government taking short posts while doing his study of the Laws of the State and of the Malay language.

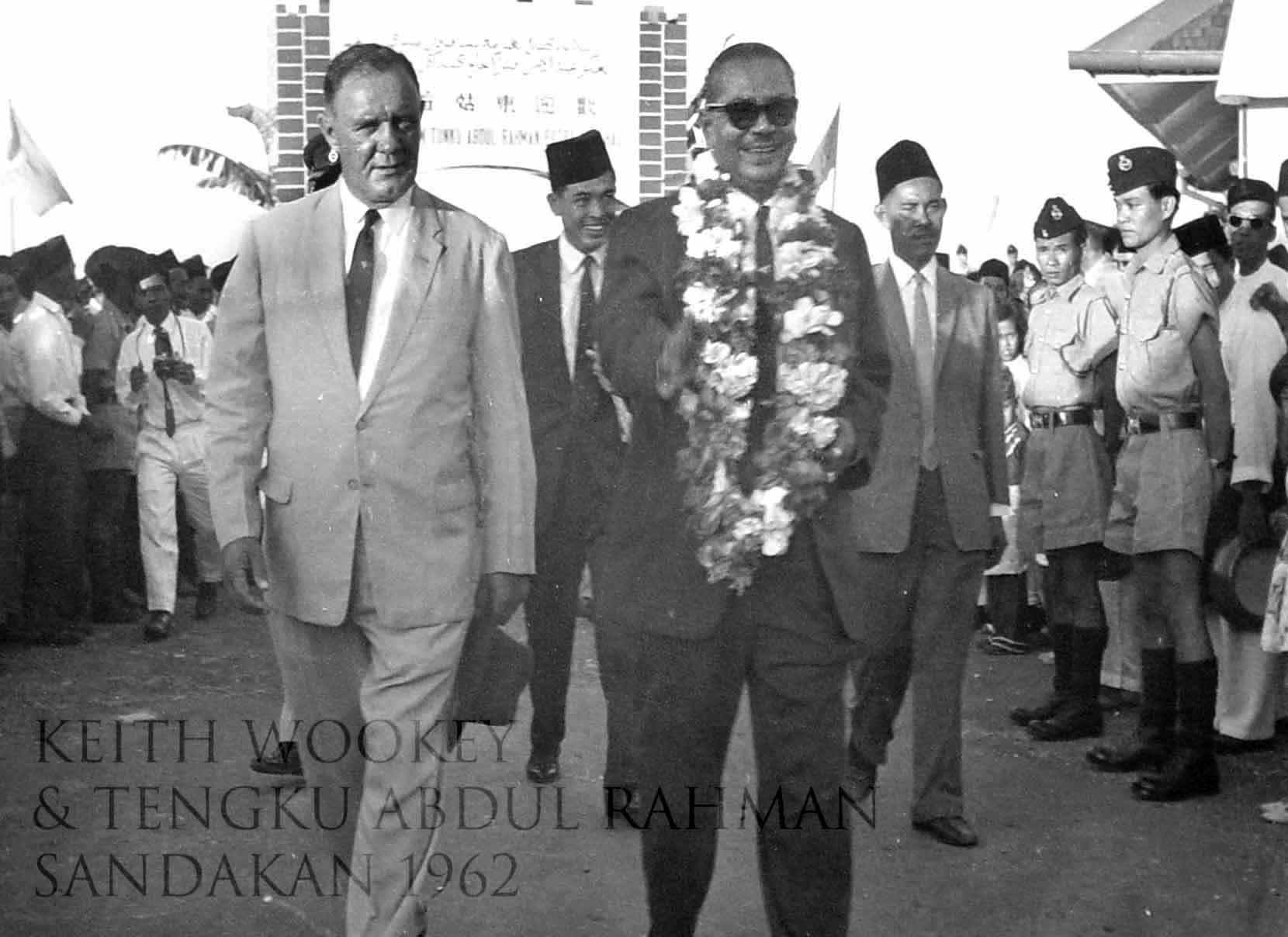
Hon Keith Wookey with Tunku Abdul Rahman, Sandakan 1962

In 1938, two years after his arrival in Sandakan, Keith became Assistant District officer at Mempakul, Kuala Penyu (today as the westernmost part of Sabah, Malaysia; known as Kampung Mempakul and its township known today as Menumbok) and then was posted to Kota Belud after a year. During his stay in Kota Belud, Keith met his first wife, Tampusis, a Kadazan-Dusun lass; they had two daughters, Agnes (born 1939) and Susan (born 1941). During this time, Keith lived in various Kampongs for weeks at a time, and claims he became proficient in various dialects, notably the local Kadazandusun language. Not long after Susan’s birth in 1941, Keith’s family moved to Lahad Datu where he was appointed as an Assistant District Officer.

=== Life during the War ===
In January 1942, while Keith was posted in Lahad Datu, the rule of the British North Borneo Chartered Company was abruptly ended and North Borneo was taken over by Japanese Imperial forces after their landing in Jesselton (presently known as Kota Kinabalu). Despite the impossibility of resisting the Japanese naval and military forces, the chartered company ordered its posted officials to stay in their assigned places and aid in protecting the locals by giving advice in the face of the invasion.

Keith, during this time, was badly beaten and taken away from his family, while Tampusis was forced to remarry in order to protect herself from the Japanese Imperial Army. The Japanese shipped Keith first to Sandakan at Berhala Island with Harry Keith and other fellow officers. Later on, he was moved to Kuching, spending his next three years in Batu Lintang camp which was under the command of Lieutenant-Colonel Tatsuji Suga.

"The behaviour of the population during this period was, with very few exceptions, exemplary, and many paid for their loyalty with their lives. The British Military Administration, which contained a few former Chartered Company senior officers, found the Colony in a state of appalling devastation."

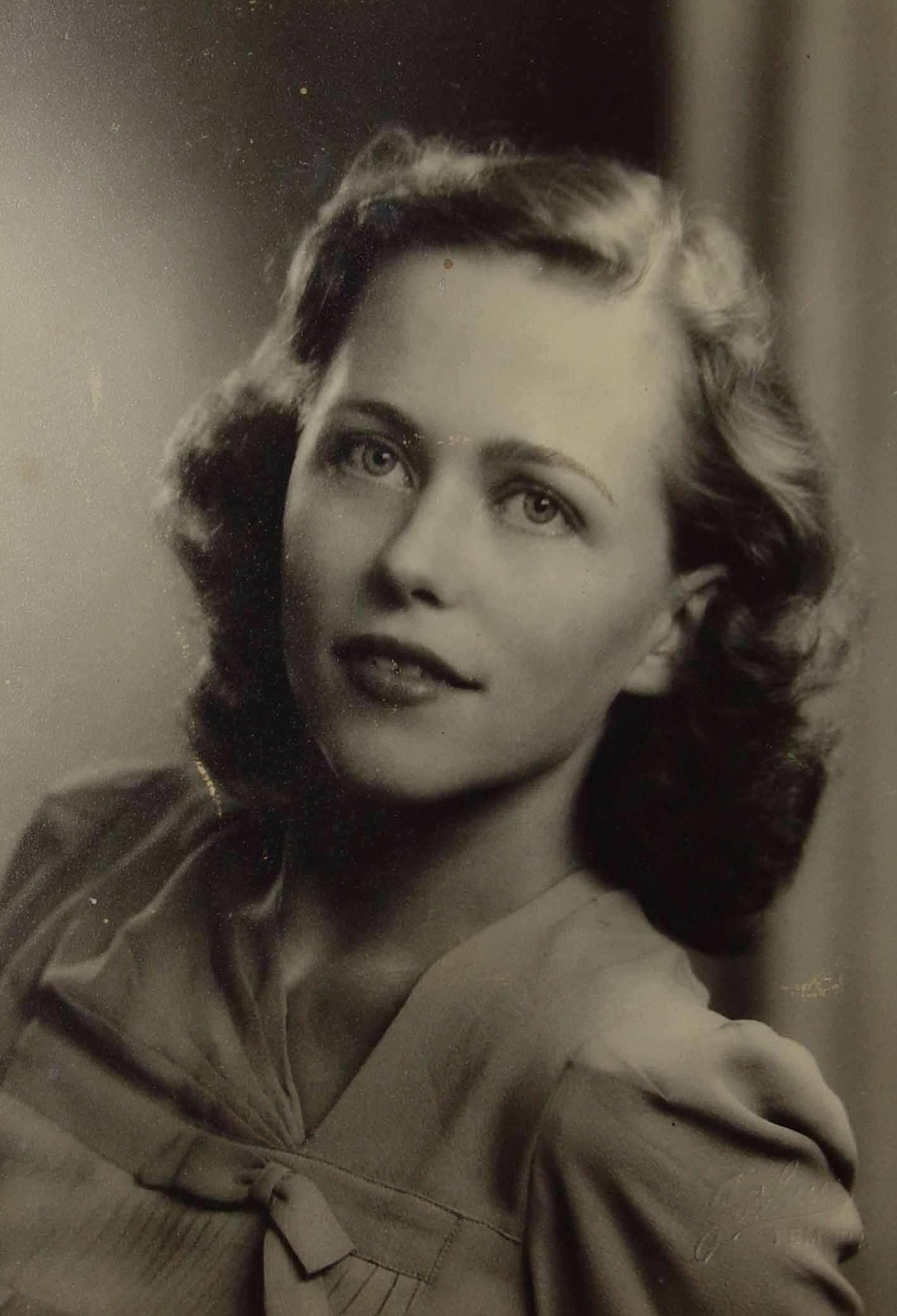
Eleanor Farrell, Sydney New South Wales 1947

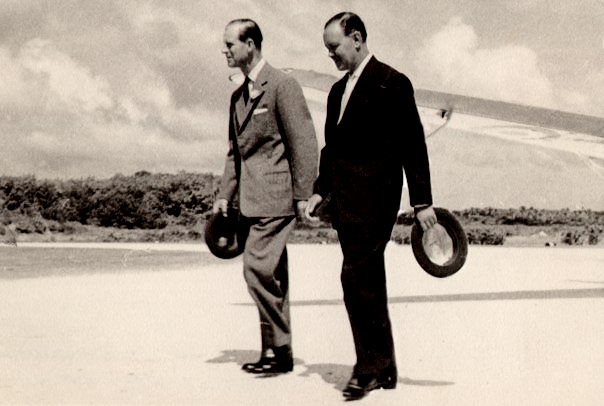
Prince Philip and The Hon Keith Wookey, Sandakan, North Borneo 1959

For more than three years, North Borneo remained under the control of the Japanese Imperial Army until the units of the Ninth Australian Division landed in Labuan on 10 June 1945. In Keith’s personal journal entry dated 20 August 1945, he states that this was the first time he was given a piece of paper to write on since the Japanese invasion.

=== Post War ===
In September 1945, Keith and his friend Dr. Marcus Clarke, then a surgeon captured by the Japanese and stationed in Batu Lintang as well, were released from internment. Shortly thereafter, Keith, in October 1945 Keith, together with Dr Marcus Clarke, traveled to Sydney, Australia for recuperation in 1946. Keith left Sydney on the Aquitania on 10/12/45 arriving Southampton late January 1945.

Upon his return to Jessellton, North Borneo in April 1947, Keith played a key role in the rebuilding and the development of North Borneo in the aftermath of the Second World War. During this time, North Borneo changed status from a protectorate of England and administration by the Chartered Company to a Crown Colony, (British North Borneo) overseen by the government of Britain in London.

Keith Wookey, on leave returned to Sydney April 1947. During a short stay in Australia, he met Eleanor Farrell, whom he then married in September 1947. Upon his return to North Borneo with his new wife Eleanor on 22 January 1948. Keith was then posted to Tenom as a District Officer. Two years later, Keith, because of his close relations with the natives was seconded to the Secretariat. Eleanor, his wife also moved to Jesselton and in May 1950, their first son Michael was born.

There, during the early 1950s, Keith was seconded to the Secretariat as it was found his close relations to the natives and, importantly a good knowledge of the local language. Keith worked closely with the Governor and soon became close friends with Governor Roland Turnbull. In December 1955, his second son Robin was born. After five-years of service working with the Governor in the Secretariat, Keith was appointed as a permanent member of the Executive Legislature of the Colony of North Borneo. In 1956 Keith was moved to Sandakan, North Borneo and subsequently was appointed as Resident of Sandakan in 1958 .

Wookey was appointed by the Queen as an Official Member of the Executive Council of the Colony of North Borneo. He, with may others in the service were concerned the succession by the crown was being rushed for the colony of North Borneo to join the Malaysian federation as it was perceived that the State was not ready, and as a result was unfaily accused of obstruction by Tunku Abdul Rahman, Malaysia's first Prime Minister.

In November 9, 1963, Keith passed away of a heart attack shortly after North Borneo (now known as Sabah) was granted self-governance on 31 August 1963, preparing to join Malaya, Sarawak and Singapore in forming the Federation of Malaysia.
