= Alayi =

- Town
- Location in Nigeria
- Coordinates: 5°44′N 7°36′E
- Country: Nigeria
- State: Abia State
- LGA: Bende Local Government Area
- Town/Village: Alayi Community
- Time zone: UTC+1 (W.A.T)

Alayi Igboji-Akuru Community is a suburban town in the Bende local government area of Abia State, Nigeria. The Community consisted of four main clans of Amankalu, Akoliufu, Ugwueke and Ezeukwu. Alayi is one of the communities that make up Umunnato (Item-Okpi, Alayi Igboji-Akuru, and Igbere-Ebiri) all in Bende LGA. It is about 100 kilometres (60 mi) from Aba, a commercial city of Eastern Nigeria, approximately 100 km (60 mi) from Owerri Airport, 32 km (20 mi) from Umuahia, the capital city of Abia State, 13 km (8 mi) from Uzuakoli, 11 km (7 mi) to Abiriba and 24 km (15 mi) to Ohafia. Alayi is divided into two sections, Amankalu and Akoliufu

== Demographics ==
Many of its people are from Bende local government area of Abia State. But people of other ethnic origins, as well as some foreign nationals from Ghana, Togo and other countries also live and work in Alayi.

== Constituencies and neighbouring areas ==
Alayi is divided into two major constituencies, Amankalu and Akoliufu, with 5 autonomous communities in each of them. The autonomous communities in Akoliufu are: Amaeke, Amaoku/Amaukwu, Agboakoli, Umenyere and Etitialayi. The autonomous communities in Amankalu are: Isiaku, Etiti Ama Elu, Amaokwe-elu, Amaigwu and Okpufu/Amautazi. Alayi is bordered by Item, Igbere, Umuhu, Akoli, Ozuitem, Isuikwuato, Ezeukwu and Ugwueke.

== Mode of governance ==
Alayi is governed by Igboji of Alayi (Igbojiakuru) with the help of other traditional rulers and their Council of Chiefs. There is also the youth movement called "Uke Ọza Ama" which helps to keep the youths under control and also sees to the cleanliness of the village. This group disciplines any child that gets beyond the control of his/her parents, thereby helping other children to behave well.

== History of government and leaders ==
Historically, Alayi like many other Igbo communities, did not have a king. But the supreme leadership role of all the Alayi clans was maintained by Ọha Anọ, headed by Umuokpo Amakwu Akoliufu.

In the 20th century, upon arrival of the European missionaries and Western colonialism, the warrant chieftaincy role was given to Mazi Okereke Aka which later translated to pseudo-kingship. The ruler of Alayi is given the title of Igboji. All ten villages that make up Alayi have "Onu-mkpu" (a centre) at Eke Akoli in Amaeke Alayi, symbolizing the origin of each village. The immediate past rulers of Alayi since the first warrant chief include Eze (His Royal Majesty) Ukeje Aka, the father of Eze Okereke Aka (a.k.a. Okereke Nne-Ote) the uncle of Eze Onwukwe Onwukwe. (During the late 1960s when Eze Okereke Aka became ill and was incapacitated, he appointed Chief Okereke Elendu (a.k.a. Okom Ikpo) to head his council, and he was succeeded by Chief Edward Okorie (a.k.a. Okorie Emeri) after he died. Chief Edward Okorie headed the council until Okereke Nne-Ote died and thereafter. Chief Edward Okorie is the father of Chief Chekwas Okorie.

Upon the death of Eze Okereke Nne-Ote, his son Chief Nwosu Okereke was appointed to take over the position of Igboji. However, he declined the offer, and it passed to his cousin Eze Onwukwe S. Onwukwe who reigned until his death in 2008. Eze Onwukwe Onwukwe was buried in December 2008.

Since the death of Eze Onwukwe S Onwukwe, there was no successor to the Igboji of Alayi title because all the ten villages are now autonomous, each with their traditional ruler.

There weas a controversy regarding the status of Amaeke and Igboji in general. This has been settled as the traditional ruler of Amaeke has assumed the title of Ignoji of Amaeke.

=== Traditional rulers ===
Title	Traditional Ruler	Autonomous Community	Sub Section	Palace
Igboji of Amaeke	Eze Ukeje Philip	Amaeke	Amaeke	Amaeke Alayi
Akoliukwu of Agboakoli	Eze Linus U. Okoronkwo	Agboakoli	Akoliufu	Agboakoli Alayi
Mgbidiukwu of Amakwu	Eze Christopher Ukaoma	Amakwu	Akoliufu	Amakwu Alayi
Ohaukwu of Amaukwu	Eze Emmanuel I. Chukwu	Amaukwu	Akoliufu	Amaukwu Amaoku Alayi
Enyere Ukwu of Umuenyere	Eze (Pst) Ignatius Iheke Uche	Umuenyere	Akoliufu	Amaozara, Umuenyere Alayi
Udoha of Etiti Alayi	Eze Maurice Eke Okorie	Etiti	Akoliufu	Umenyere Alayi
Aku Ukwu of Isiaku	Eze (Barr.) Uche Elekwa	Isiaku	Amankalu	Isiaku Amankalu Alayi
Udo of Isiama	Eze J.K. Abah	Isiama	Amankalu	Isiama Amankalu Alayi
Anorie of Umunkalu	Eze Ejere Igwe Aka (deceased)	Umunkalu	Amankalu	Amachi Amankalu Alayi
Nkalukwu of Amankalu	Eze David M. Ufere	Amankalu	Amankalu	Amaururu Amankalu Alayi
Igwu of Amaigwu	Late Eze Steven Ogbu Iheke	Amaigwu	Amankalu	Amaigwu Amankalu Alayi

== Culture ==
Many Alayi people are traders and industrialists in Aba and Lagos, as well as the used clothing importation business in countries like Republic of Benin, Togo, Ivory Coast and Ghana. In recent times, Alayi has produced many professionals including academics, lawyers, doctors, and accountants. The most common religion is Christianity.

Alayi has a very rich culture, which is reflected not only in their language and food but also in dances, group formations, and festivals. The people have norms, customs and practices that have endured over time through which conflicts are controlled and resolved. The New Yam Festival is the most popular. It is celebrated in August with many dances including Ọkọnkọ, Ekpo, Ọbọnị and Akpanikọ. These dances are exclusively for men. There are also many other seasonal dances like Ikoro, Ajọnkwụ (Amaeke), Edere (Umuenyere) Lụghụlụghụ (Amaọkụ/Amaukwụ) Ịgwansi (Amakwụ), Enyom (Elugwu and Obuchie Amankalu), Aka Ọkụkụ (Ezi Alayi), Omume Anyụ (Amaigwu, Amankalu), Oborri (Umuezike Amankalu).

Ụmụagbala Amautazi and Umuachom Amankalu Alayi are also clans in Alayi which observes a unique culture known as Ekete. This is performed by playing a particular drum by men, performing magical acts (spiritism) and dancing. During this festival women and children are regarded as observers. This festival is observed during the New Yam Festival (precisely two days after eating the new yam, Afọ market day. These clans have what is known as (Ikwu) which are Ndiokereke, Ndịọtai, and. The ikwu in general is called Ụmụ Anya. Their old men in Umuagbala worship an idol god known as (Ọgbaegbu) discovered by their forefathers. Allegiance to this deity is deteriorating through the influence of Christianity.
