= Anastasios Christodoulou =

Greek Cypriot university administrator

Anastasios Christodoulou in 1996.

Anastasios Christodoulou CBE (Greek: Αναστάσιος Χριστοδούλου; 1 May 1932 – 20 May 2002), often known as Chris Christodoulou, was a British-based Greek Cypriot university administrator. He was the Secretary General of the Association of Commonwealth Universities and the Foundation Secretary of the Open University.

== Early years ==
Christodoulou was born in Cyprus in 1932, the oldest of three sons of Yianni Christodoulos, a cobbler, and his wife, Maria, née Haji. He came to London when he was three to join his father who was working as a kitchen porter in Soho. He hardly knew his mother, who died giving birth to twin sons, who lived. These twin brothers later went to live in Barbados with foster parents. Christodoulou had been born on Easter Day and was named 'Anastasios' by his parents, meaning 'Resurrection'. He lived with his father above a Soho restaurant and early on displayed a precocious intelligence. He went to a local primary school aged five, not knowing a word of English, but by half-term was interpreting for much of the local Greek Cypriot community. Aged 11 he won a place at St Marylebone Grammar School.

== The Open University ==
After graduating in 1955 from Queen's College, Oxford in Philosophy, Politics and Economics, he joined the overseas Colonial Service and served as District Officer and later District Commissioner and Magistrate in Tanganyika. In 1963 he moved to the University of Leeds, where he was Assistant Registrar and later Deputy Secretary. In 1968, he became Foundation Secretary of the Open University, having been appointed by Walter Perry, the University's Vice-Chancellor. They began work on 1 January 1969. While in recent years the OU has been described as one of the great educational initiatives of the twentieth century, its early days were difficult. Labour politicians Harold Wilson and Jennie Lee had been determined that it should be a 'proper' university, there were many who believed that the University would fail, and would award worthless degrees. Christodoulou also had to overcome various disputes between course teams, the BBC, and regional organisers. When Edward Heath's Conservative Party came to power in 1970 Margaret Thatcher was appointed Secretary of State for Education and Science. She proved to be deeply sceptical about the academic standards of the OU, believing that students could get degrees just by ticking boxes, because some courses included multiple-choice questions. Christodoulou and Walter Perry travelled back to London with Thatcher after she had visited the Open University, and managed to persuade her that it was genuine and useful. In 1971 Christodoulou was responsible for managing 43,000 initial applications, from which 24,000 students began degree courses. He was appointed Commander of the Order of the British Empire (CBE) in the 1978 Queen's Birthday Honours. In May 1981, he was awarded an honorary degree from the Open University as Doctor of the University.

== Later career ==
Christodoulou was the Secretary General of the Association of Commonwealth Universities from 1980 to 1996. He increased the membership of the association, and raised £2 million in a 75th anniversary appeal with the Canadian academic Thomas Symons. A great supporter of the Commonwealth, Christodoulou was also acting Chairman of the Governors of the Commonwealth Institute, Secretary of the Commonwealth Scholarship and Fellowship Plan, and a Governor of the Commonwealth of Learning in Vancouver. In 1996 he received an honorary doctorate from Brunel University. He was a Trustee of Richmond, The American International University in London, and in 1997 received an honorary doctorate in International relations from that university. He also received honorary doctorates from the University of Ottawa and the University of Auckland. In 1995 he received the National University of Lesotho's fiftieth anniversary award for distinguished service to African education.

Christodoulou retained his links with Cyprus. With Loucas Haji-Ioannou, the father of Stelios Haji-Ioannou, the founder of EasyJet, he attempted to set up a new Cyprus university, but, to his disappointment, Haji-Ioannou pulled out. Shortly before his death Christodoulou returned to the village where he had been born but was unhappy to discover that it had been occupied by Turkish troops. During his last years he was affected by eyesight problems and was treated for cancer.

On 10 December 1955, he married Joan Patricia Edmunds, a librarian and the daughter of John Samuel Edmunds, an engineer. They had two sons and two daughters.

Anastasios Christodoulou died from cancer at the General Hospital, Milton Keynes, on 20 May 2002.

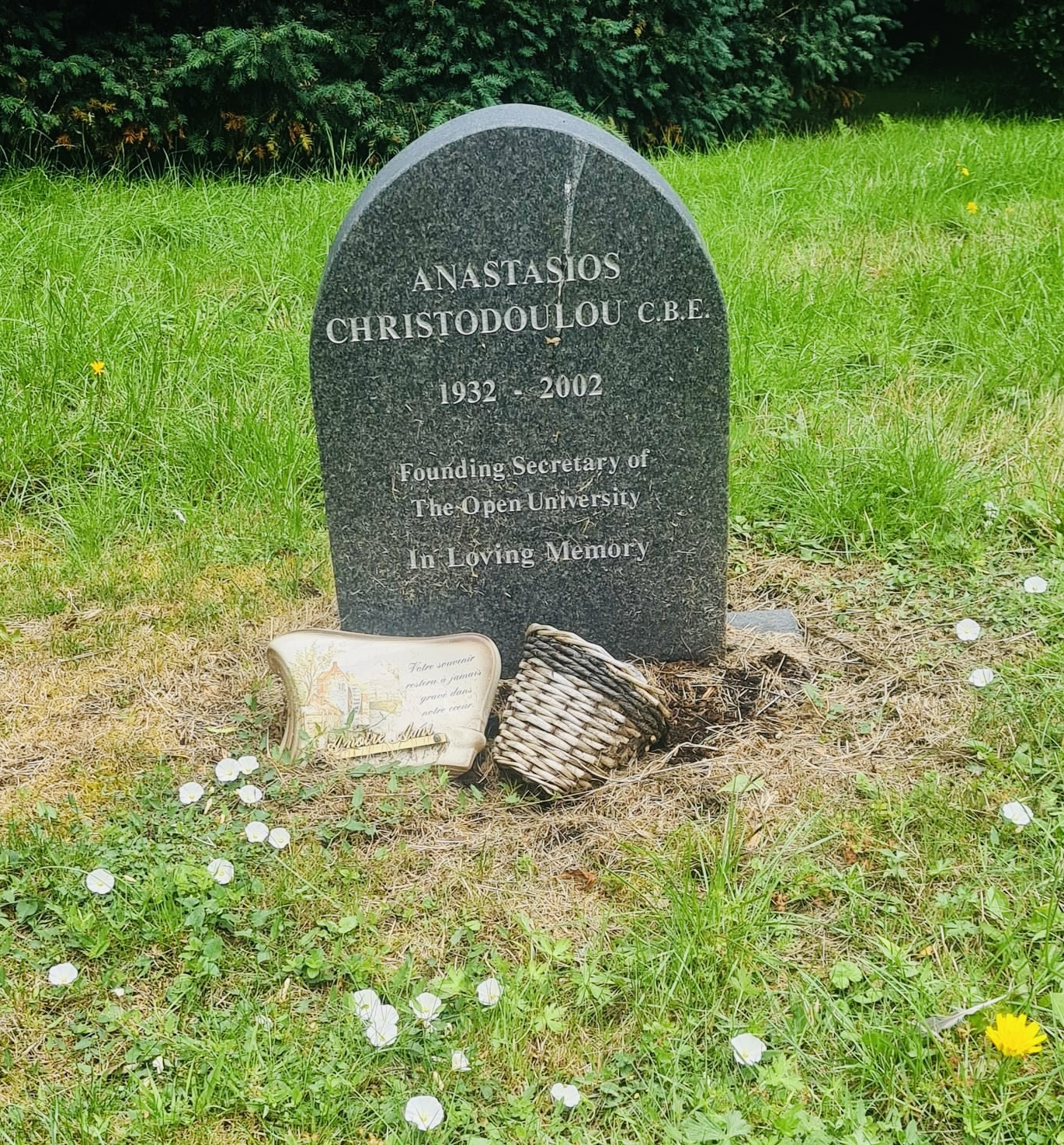
The grave of Anastasios Christodoulou in 2023

He was buried in the churchyard of the now deconsecrated Church of St Michael of the Open University located in the grounds of the university in Walton, Milton Keynes.

== Publications ==
- 'The Commonwealth of Universities: The Story of the Association of Commonwealth Universities, 1963–1988' by Hugh W. Springer, Alastair Niven, Anastasios Christodoulou, Association of Commonwealth Universities Staff Published by Association of Commonwealth Universities, ISBN 0-85143-109-7
