= Nkpa =

Nigerian settlement

Nkpa is a small town in Bende Local Government Area of Abia state in Nigeria. It became an autonomous community in 1983. It is made up of several small villages.

== Geography ==
The town is accessible through Uzuakoli and Umuahia. It is connected to Lohum and Lodu by a ring road, but as of 2016 roads in the area are in poor condition, with some upgrades planned.

== Economy ==
Nkpa's economy is mainly agriculture based. The area has many oil palm plantations and root crops such as cassava are commonly grown. Nkpa has a micro finance bank to support her thriving economy.
