= Nsude pyramid shrines =

Archaeological site in Nigeria

The Nsude pyramid shrines are an archaeological site located in Nsude, a village in Southeastern Nigeria in modern-day Enugu.

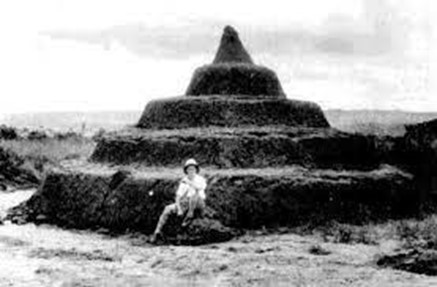
A Nsude pyramid taken by G.I Jones 1935

These pyramid-shaped shrines were constructed by the Igbo people. In the 1930s an anthropologist and colonial administrator in the area, G.I. Jones, photographed them.

== Eyewitness accounts ==
Archaeologist Kenneth Murray published an article on these pyramids in "The Nigerian Field", the journal of the Nigerian Field Society. In it he discussed finding ten solid mud pyramids about 2.01 kilometres (1.25 miles) from Nsude but in open ground and not visible from Nsude. These were circular and estimated to be twenty-seven feet in diameter, 5.5–5.8 metres (18–19 ft) high and in two rows twenty yards apart and seventy yards long. In each row, they were about 3.7 metres (12 ft) apart. He talked to local people about them and was told that "tutelary or protective fetish or juju of the village of Nsude is called Uto and is said to possess the special merit of killing thieves."

George Basden wrote two ethnographic studies of the Igbo. In one of them he wrote about a visit to ten pyramids near Nsude. Two years before Basden's visit Uto's priest was told by the local Dibia, a mystic or witchdoctor, that Uto wanted 10 large Nkpura (pyramids) built in his honor as a sign of his greatness. Basden says that there were meant to be 10 of these because "there are ten quarters or extended families in the village and each was required to erect one Nkpuru." The local laterite soil was unsuitable so they were built on soft soil nearby.

== Materials ==
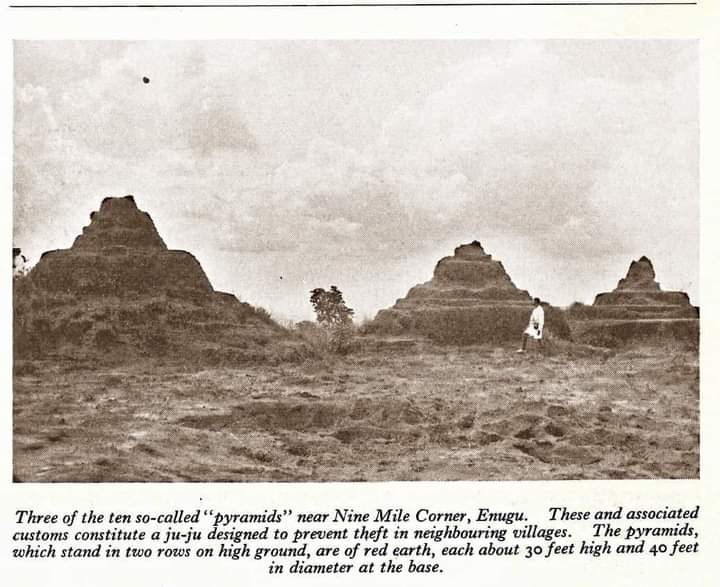
Three Nsude Pyramids

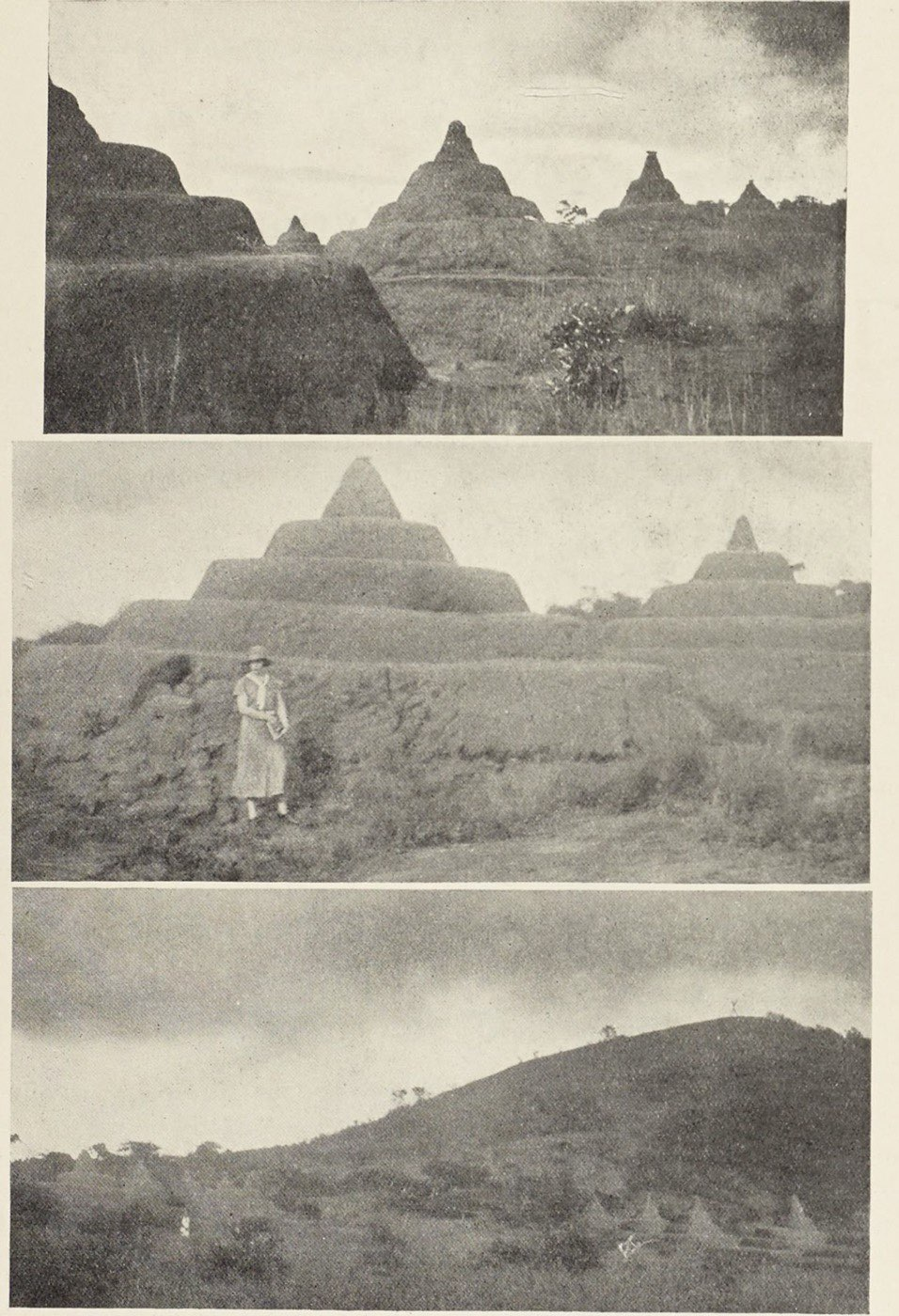
Multiple Nsude Pyramids

The Nsude pyramids were constructed using earth and clay, and they consist of a series of stepped terraces that form a pyramid-like shape. The first base section was 60 ft (18 m) in circumference and 3 ft (0.91 m) in height. The next stack was 45 ft (14 m) in circumference.Circular stacks continued until the structure reached its summit. The pyramids are generally understood to have served a ceremonial and religious function, forming part of a shrine dedicated to the deity Uto (or Ala/Uto), where ritual observances and offerings were conducted.They were thought to have been used as platforms for religious rituals and ceremonies.

=== Cultural significance ===
The pyramids are thought to have held spiritual and cultural importance to the Igbo people. They are likely linked to religious practices and rituals of the time. The stepped terraces of the pyramids could have been used for various ritualistic activities, including offerings, sacrifices, and ceremonies related to agricultural or ancestral veneration.The purpose of these pyramids is believed to have been primarily ceremonial and religious. They were thought to have been used as platforms for religious rituals and ceremonies. Over time, the Nsude pyramids experienced erosion and degradation due to their earthen construction and exposure to the elements. Today, only remnants of the pyramids remain.
