= Gwilliam Iwan Jones =

British photographer and anthropologist

Gwilym Iwan Jones (3 May 1904 – 25 January 1995) was a Welsh photographer and anthropologist. His photographs of life in Nigeria in the 1930s, taken whilst serving as a colonial District Officer, led to an interest in ethnology and a second career as an academic at the University of Cambridge.

== Life ==
Jones was born in Cape Colony and grew up in Chile and England, studying at St. John's School, Leatherhead before winning a scholarship to Jesus College, Oxford. He then worked for the Colonial Service in Nigeria (1926–1946), serving as District Officer for Bende and the surrounding area. He became interested in the culture of the peoples of southeastern Nigeria, using a Rolleiflex camera to build up an extensive record of life in the area at the time. Amongst other topics, his photographs show masks being used in performance, and shrines. He married Ursula Whittall in 1939 and his interest in ethnology led him to return to England as Lecturer in Anthropology at the University of Cambridge, a post he held in conjunction with a Fellowship of Jesus College, Cambridge. He was a noted scholar on African issues, returning on various occasions to Nigeria for research. He retired in 1971, but continued to write and remained active within Jesus College.

== Publications ==
- The Ibo and Ibibio Speaking Peoples of S.E. Nigeria (with Daryll Forde) (1950)
- The Trading States of the Oil Rivers (1963) (ISBN 978-0-598-05424-1)
- The Art of Southeastern Nigeria (1984) (ISBN 978-0521259279)
- Annual Reports of Bende Division, South Eastern Nigeria, 1905–1912 (1986)
- Ibo Art (1989)
- From Slaves to Palm Oil (1989) (ISBN 978-0-902993-26-6)
