= James Pollock (Northern Ireland politician) =

British colonial administrator and politician

Captain Sir James Huey Hamill Pollock, CMG OBE KStJ (1893–14 March 1982), also known as Shamus Pollock, was a British colonial administrator and unionist politician in Northern Ireland.

Pollock studied at the Royal School, Armagh and the University of Leeds. During the First World War he served as a Lieutenant, Captain, and Major in the 7th Royal Irish Rifles. He then joined the Colonial Service, spending many years in British Palestine, including service as District Officer in Ramallah and District Commissioner for Jerusalem.

He retired in 1953 and was immediately elected an Ulster Unionist Party member of the Senate of Northern Ireland, serving until 1956.
