= Bende, Nigeria =

Bende Ndi Bende
- Local government area
- Motto: Bara Alagi Uru
- Interactive map of Bende
- Location in Nigeria
- Coordinates: 5°34′N 7°38′E
- Country: Nigeria
- State: Abia State

Government
  - Bende Town Union (BTU): Chief Engr Kalu Offor (BTU) Abuja Branch

Population (2006)
  - Total: 192,621
- Time zone: UTC+1 (WAT)

Bende is a local government area in Abia State, Nigeria with headquarters located in Bende Community also known as Amaeke. Bende Local Government Area (L.G.A) of Abia state lies on 70 30I of the Greenwich Meridian and latitude 50 30I North of the Equator. It is composed of thirteen (13) communities, namely: Alayi, Bende, Ezeukwu, Igbere, Item, Itumbuzo, Nkpa, Ntalakwu, Ozuitem, Ugwueke, Umu-imenyi, Umuhu-Ezechi, and Uzuakoli.

The population of Bende L.G.A. according to the 2016 population census was 192,621 persons. Bende L.G.A has agriculture climatic conditions typically of the tropics. Bende is bounded in the north by Cross River State, Afikpo and Ohaozara, and in the South by Arochukwu and Ohafia, while in the East and West by Ikwuano L.G.A. and Umuahia L.G.A respectively. Agriculture is widely the occupation of the people and it is a major rice producing area in Abia state.

== Climate ==
In Bende, the dry season is hot, muggy, and usually cloudy whereas the wet season is warm, oppressive, and overcast. The average annual temperature ranges between 67 °F and 87 °F, rarely falling below 60 °F or rising over 90 °F.

=== Cloud ===
Over the course of the year at Bende, there are noticeable seasonal variations in the average percentage of sky that is covered by clouds.

Around November 24 marks the start of Bende's clearer season, which lasts for 2.6 months and ends around February 11.

December is the clearest month of the year in Bende, with the sky remaining clear, mostly clear, or partly cloudy 41% of the time on average.

Beginning about February 11 and lasting for 9.4 months, the cloudier period of the year ends around November 24.

May is the cloudiest month of the year in Bende, with the sky being overcast or mostly cloudy 86% of the time on average.

=== Precipitation ===
A day that has at least 0.04 inches of liquid or liquid-equivalent precipitation is considered to be wet. In Bende, the likelihood of rainy days varies wildly throughout the year.

From March 27 to November 8 is the wetter season, which has a 7.4-month duration with a greater than 45% chance of precipitation on any one day. In Bende, September has an average of 25.4 days with at least 1.0 millimetre (0.04 inches) of precipitation, making it the month with the most wet days.

Between November 8 and March 27, or 4.6 months, is the dry season. In Bende, January has an average of 1.4 days with at least 1.0 millimetre (0.04 inches) of precipitation, making it the month with the fewest wet days.

We categorize rainy days into those that only involve rain, those that only involve snow, and those that combine the two. With an average of 25.4 days, September is the month in Bende with the most rainy days. According to this classification, rain alone has an annual peak probability of 86% on September 11 and is the most frequent type of precipitation throughout the year.

== Localities ==
- Agbamuzu
- Agbo-mmiri
- Alayi
- Ama-ogwu
- Amaediaba
- Amaoba
- Amorji-Imenyi
- Amaozara
- Bende (town)
- Etiti
- Ezeukwu
- Iluoma Nzeakoli
- Igbere
- Item
- Isiegbu
- Lodu Imenyi
- Ndi-ekeugo
- Ndiokorukwu
- Nditoti
- Nkpa
- Obuohia
- Ogo Ubi
- Okporoenyi
- Okputong
- Onuinyang
- Ovum Ugwu Nkpa
- Ukpom
- Umuokoro,
- Umuorie,
- Ugwueke

== Notable people ==
- Arunma Oteh, the former Director-General of Nigeria's Security Exchange Commission. She was also the chair of the Royal African Society in July 2021, appointed to succeed Zeinab Badawi.
- Benjamin Kalu, politician and Deputy Speaker of the 10th House of Representatives, representing Bende federal constituency
- Orji Uzor Kalu, a Nigerian politician and a two time governor of Abia State, Nigeria.
- Kalu Uche, Former Nigerian Footballer.
- Ikechukwu Uche, Former nigerian footballer.
- Uche Kalu, former nigerian footballer.
- Jerry Eze, Nigerian pastor.
- Chimaobi Desmond Anyaso – Nigerian businessman, investor, philanthropist and political figure

== See also ==
- List of villages in Abia State
