= Chimaobi Desmond Anyaso =

Nigerian businessman, investor, philanthropist and political figure (born 1980)

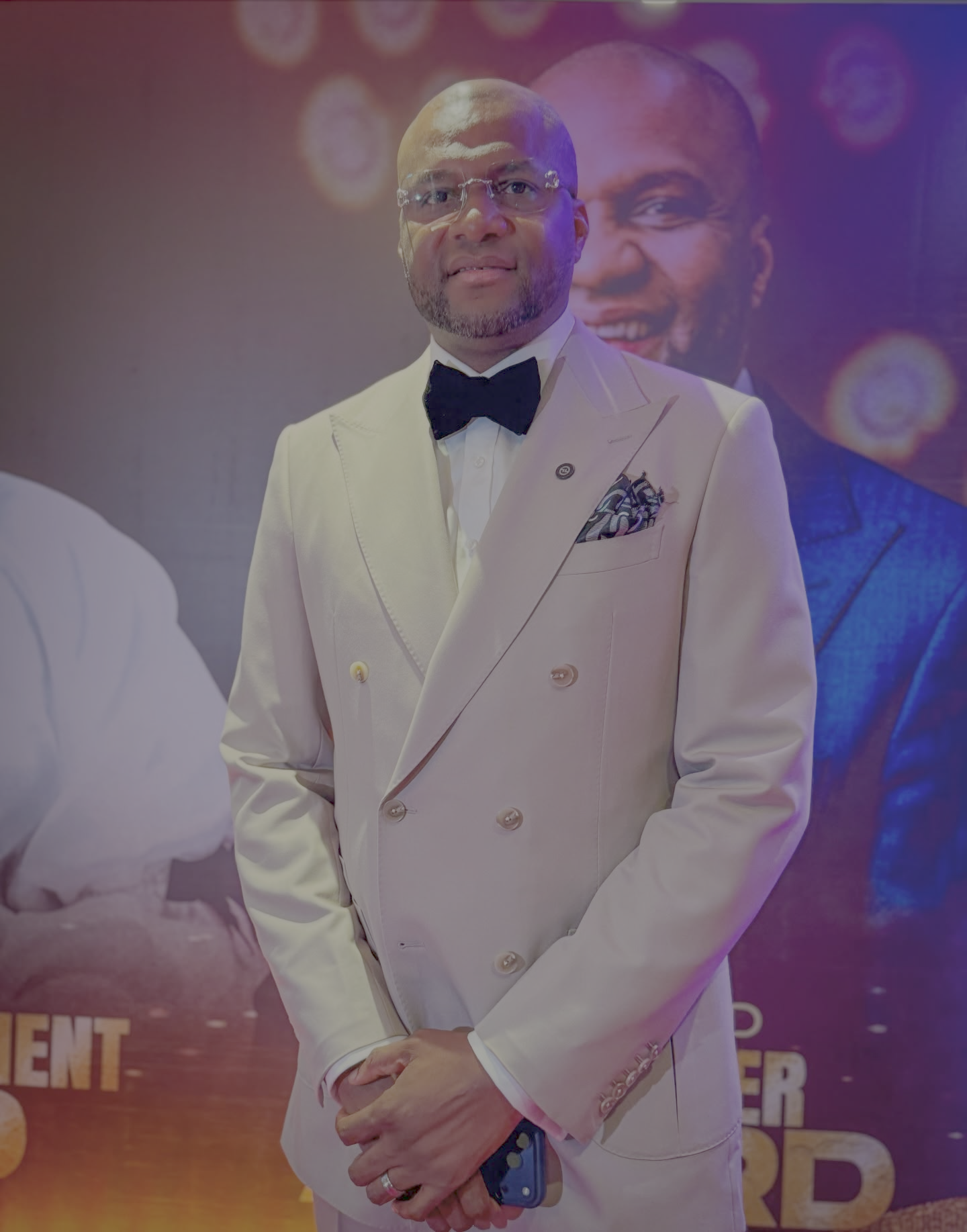
- Dr. Chimaobi Desmond Anyaso
- Born: 16 September 1980; Aba, Abia State, Nigeria
- Occupations: Businessman, investor, philanthropist, politician
- Known for: Founder, Caades Group
- Spouse: Adanna

Chimaobi Desmond Anyaso (born 16 September 1980) is a Nigerian businessman, investor, philanthropist and political figure. He is the founder and chairman of the Caades Group, a diversified conglomerate with interests in oil and gas, real estate, hospitality, financial services and healthcare.

Anyaso is known for his contributions to entrepreneurship, youth development, and philanthropy in Nigeria, particularly through initiatives focused on education and healthcare. He has also been active in Nigerian politics, including participation in elections and political advocacy in Abia State.

== Early Life and Background ==
Chimaobi Desmond Anyaso was born on 16 September 1980 in Aba, Abia State, Nigeria. He hails from Igbere in Bende Local Government Area of Abia State.

He was raised in a family of traders and grew up in a relatively comfortable household. His parents were both involved in business, which influenced his early interest in entrepreneurship.

As a child, Anyaso demonstrated business instincts early, engaging in petty trading during school holidays despite having his basic needs met. This early exposure shaped his long-term orientation toward enterprise and financial independence.

== Education ==
Anyaso received his primary and secondary education in Abia State.

He later attended Ebonyi State University, where he obtained a Bachelor of Arts degree in English and Literature between 2000 and 2004.

He furthered his education at the University of Lagos, where he earned a Master of Business Administration (MBA) and a Master’s degree in Management. In addition, he obtained an Executive Management Certification from the Peter J. Tobin College of Business, St. John’s University, Manhattan, New York.

== Early Career ==
Following his graduation, Anyaso began his career working with several companies, including Elmline Nigeria Ltd., South Globe Ltd., Traqui Ltd., and Geo Bureau de Change. He later joined Aquitane Oil and Gas Limited, where he rose through the ranks to become General Manager in 2006. His tenure at the company played a significant role in shaping his expertise in the oil and gas sector.

== Business Career ==
=== Caades Group ===
In 2006, Anyaso founded Caades Oil and Gas Limited, marking the beginning of his entrepreneurial journey. The company later evolved into the Caades Group, a diversified conglomerate operating across multiple sectors including oil and gas, real estate, hospitality, financial services and healthcare. As chairman and Group Managing Director, he oversees the strategic direction and operations of the group.

=== Ceecon Energy ===
Following the establishment of Caades, Anyaso was instrumental in the formation of Ceecon Energy Oil and Gas Limited, where he served as Managing Director between 2009 and 2012. Under his leadership, the company reportedly achieved transactions exceeding $1 billion and developed significant infrastructure, including petroleum storage facilities.

=== Other Business Interests ===
Anyaso has founded and led several companies across different sectors, including:

- SC & C Bureau de Change Ltd, licensed by the Central Bank of Nigeria in 2009
- Chimbaland Properties & Investment Company Ltd, a real estate development firm
- Gunvor Oil and Gas Limited, established in 2016
- Corniche Hotel, a hospitality business
- St. Edwards Specialist Hospital and Cardiac Center

His business interests span energy, real estate, healthcare, and financial services, employing over a thousand Nigerians directly and indirectly.

== Philanthropy and Social Impact ==
Anyaso is the founder of the Chima Anyaso Foundation, which focuses on youth empowerment, education, and healthcare.

He also established the Ahuoma Anyaso Education Foundation, which operates a tuition-free nursery and primary school in his hometown.

Through these initiatives:

- Over 5,000 pupils have received free education
- Thousands of individuals have benefited from free medical outreach programs
- Financial support and empowerment programs have been extended to small businesses and vulnerable groups

His philanthropic activities are concentrated primarily in Abia State and surrounding regions.

== Political Career ==
Anyaso has been active in Nigerian politics, particularly in Abia State.

He contested for a seat in the House of Representatives representing Bende Federal Constituency in 2019 under the Peoples Democratic Party (PDP).

In the 2023 general elections, he served as the deputy governorship candidate of the Young Progressives Party (YPP) in Abia State.

In 2025, he resigned from the YPP, citing strategic political considerations and continued commitment to public service. He has also been involved in political advocacy, including support for governance initiatives and mobilization efforts within Abia State.

== Public Engagement and Advocacy ==
Anyaso has been involved in various advocacy initiatives focused on governance, youth participation, and development.

He is the founder of the “Otti Again 2027 Movement,” aimed at supporting continuity in governance in Abia State.

He has also participated in public discourse on leadership, emphasizing responsibility, service, and impact in governance.

== Awards and Recognition ==
Anyaso has received several awards and recognitions for his contributions to business and society, including:

- African Achievers Award for Community Development
- Democracy Youth Icon of the Year (2017)
- Recognition as one of Nigeria’s Top 20 Business Professionals by Vanguard and Champion Newspapers
- Entrepreneur of the Year (2023)
- Real Estate Icon of the Year (2024)

He has also been recognized by various organizations for his contributions to entrepreneurship and community development.

== Personal life ==
Anyaso is married to Adanna, and they have children.

He is a Christian and is known for his interest in sports, particularly tennis and football, as well as traveling and music.

He is a member of Ikoyi Club and has held leadership roles in social organizations, including:

- Chairman, Board of Trustees of Miles Club
- President of Umu Aba Connect Association
