= List of museums in Nigeria =

This is a list of museums in Nigeria.

- Benin City National Museum
- Old Residency Museum
- Museum of Fawaaz Rocks
- Slave Trade Museum Calabar
- Esiẹ Museum
- Gidan Makama Museum Kano
- Jos Museum
- Kaduna Museum
- Kanta Museum
- National Gallery of Modern Art, Lagos
- Nigerian National Museum
- Oron Museum
- Owo Museum
- Tafawa Balewa Tomb
- Uli Beier Museum
- National Museum of Colonial History, Aba
- War Museum, Umuahia
- Niger-Delta Museum
- National Museum of Unity, Enugu
- CRIMMD Museum Nigerian Photo History, Idimu, Lagos
- National Museum of Unity, Ibadan
- Yemisi Shyllon Museum of Art, Pan-Atlantic University, Lagos
- National Museum Idi-Aba Abeokuta

== See also ==
- Tourism in Nigeria
- Culture of Nigeria
- List of museums
