= Aba Commercial Smart City =

Proposed commercial and industrial smart city in Aba, Nigeria.

- Proposed smart city development
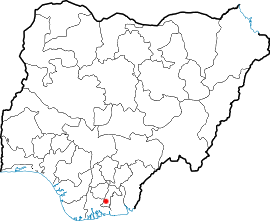
- Location of Aba in Nigeria
- Country: Nigeria
- State: Abia State
- City: Aba
- Local Government Area: Osisioma Ngwa
- Developers: Abia State Government and private investors
- Project announced: 2026

Government
  - Type: Public–private partnership

Area
  - Total: 140 ha (350 acres)
- Website: abasmartcity.com

Aba Commercial Smart City is a proposed mixed-use commercial and industrial development project located in Aba, in Abia State, Nigeria. The initiative is intended to establish a technology-enabled hub for trade, logistics, and manufacturing, with the aim of modernizing commercial infrastructure and reinforcing Aba’s role as a regional economic center in southeastern Nigeria. The project is planned as a public–private partnership involving the Abia State Government and private investors.:

== Economic History ==
Aba has historically been recognized as an important commercial and manufacturing center in Nigeria. The city hosts several major markets and clusters of small-scale industries engaged in the production of footwear, garments, leather goods, and other manufactured products. Aba is also home to Ariaria International Market, one of the largest market in West Africa.

== Development ==
In response to increasing urbanization and infrastructure challenges, proposals were introduced to develop a modern commercial district that integrates digital technology, industrial facilities, and organized trading spaces. The Aba Commercial Smart City project is conceived as part of broader efforts to upgrade infrastructure and improve the efficiency of commerce in the region.

The Aba Commercial Smart City project is planned as a large-scale urban development within the Aba metropolitan area, including land in Osisioma Ngwa. The development is expected to cover approximately 140 hectares of land.

The initiative was publicly introduced through agreements between the Abia State Government, private investors, and representatives of market associations. A memorandum of understanding (MoU) was signed in February 2026 to facilitate collaboration on the planning and implementation of the project.

== Design and Components ==
Plans for the Aba Commercial Smart City include the development of multiple infrastructure components intended to support commercial and industrial activities. Proposed facilities include:

- modern trading complexes and marketplaces
- manufacturing and industrial production facilities
- logistics and warehousing infrastructure
- residential and hospitality developments
- healthcare and public service facilities
- digital infrastructure supporting e-commerce and smart-city services

The project incorporates elements commonly associated with “smart city” initiatives, including the planned use of digital technologies to support urban management, commercial operations, and service delivery.

== Economic Significance ==
The Aba Commercial Smart City has been presented as part of broader economic development efforts aimed at strengthening industrial production and trade in southeastern Nigeria. Proponents of the project state that it could contribute to the expansion and formalization of existing manufacturing clusters in Aba, particularly those involved in footwear, textiles, and leather goods. The development is projected by promoters to create employment opportunities in sectors such as construction, manufacturing, logistics, and digital commerce.

== Governance and Partnerships ==
The project is structured as a public–private partnership involving the Abia State Government and private sector investors. Market associations and local business stakeholders have also participated in consultations related to the planning of the development.

== Leadership and Advisory Team ==
The Aba Commercial Smart City project is associated with a leadership and advisory group comprising individuals from government, engineering, business, and development sectors. The team has been referenced in relation to strategic planning, stakeholder engagement, and project development activities.

Members of the leadership and advisory team include

- Alex Chioma Otti (OFR) – Governor of Abia State
- Osita Offor – Nigerian businessman and investor
- Mike M. Okiro (CFR) – Former Inspector General of the Nigeria Police Force
- Raymond Nkemdirim (OFR) – Business executive
- Chinedu Osita Nebo (CON) – Former Nigerian minister and academic
- Elizabeth Jack Rich – Business executive and investor
