= Isi Uzo =

Local government area in Enugu State, Nigeria

- Local Government Area
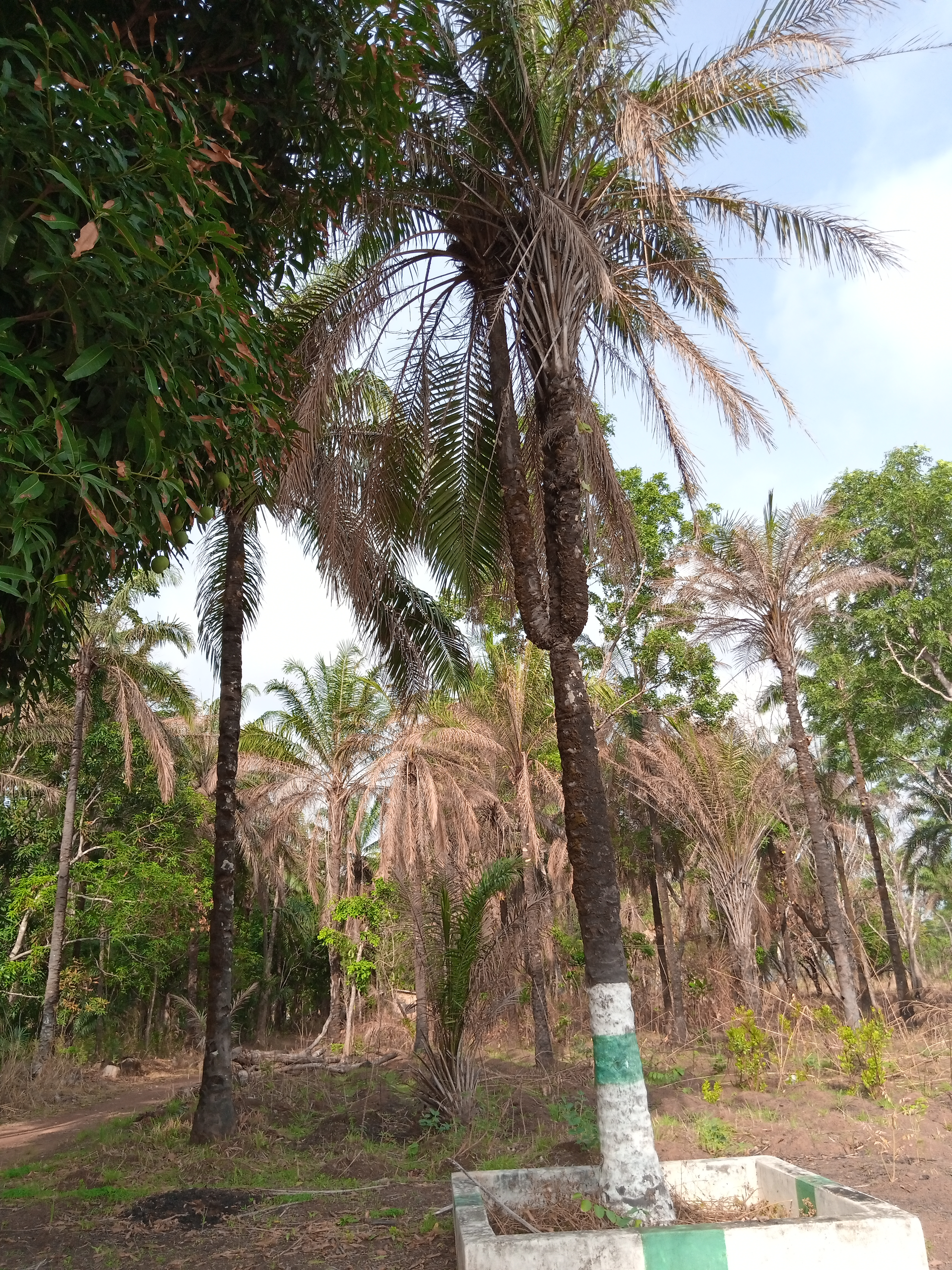
- Palm tree from Ikem, located within Isi Uzo.
- Interactive map of Isi Uzo
- Location in Nigeria
- Coordinates: 6°47′N 7°43′E
- Country: Nigeria
- State: Enugu State
- Headquarter: Ikem

Government
  - Local Government Chairman: Chief Brendan Emeka Ani (All Progressives Congress (APC))

Area
  - Total: 877 km^{2} (339 sq mi)

Population (2006 census)
  - Total: 148,415
  - Density: 169/km^{2} (438/sq mi)
- Time zone: UTC+1 (WAT)
- 3-digit postal code prefix: 412
- ISO 3166 code: NG.EN.IU

Isi Uzo// (also Isi-Uzo) is a Local Government Area (LGA) of Enugu State, Nigeria bordering Benue State and Ebonyi State. The largest city within Isi Uzo is Eha-Amufu, and the region is host to 23 autonomous communities with its capital in Ikem and the oldest town is Umualor (Umuero). After independence, the local government area was created in 1976. Isi-Uzo is a constituent of the Enugu East Senatorial District and has a population of approximately 220,000.

Isi Uzo has an area of 877 square kilometres or 339 square miles and a population of 148,415 (from the 2006 census), however modern estimates set the population at around 220,000. The LGA is a primarily rural region that relies heavily on local agribusiness initiatives for economic growth. The government area has over sixty local markets used for commerce, and the area's postal code is 412.

== History ==
=== Pre-Colonial Period ===
The inhabitants of Isi Uzo trace their lineage to the Nri Kingdom, According to elders in Umualor, the oldest village among the 5 communities is Isi Uzo. They are closely related to those nearby like Nike and Udenu through pre-colonial relationships. Isi Uzo also has close ties to Nkanu, as emphasized by Edward Nnaji, a recently deceased king of Nike. Neke, a central town in Isi Uzo, has also long served as an integral part of the community's area and held a long militaristic tradition before colonization.

=== Recent History ===
The local government area was founded in 1976 as a result of a reorganization under Olusegun Obasanjo. During this time, the nearby Ebonyi State had not yet been created, so Enugu State was composed of three senatorial districts. At this time, Isi Uzo was a part of one of these districts, Nsukka. In 1996, these areas were again reorganized, and parts of Enugu State and Abia State became Ebonyi State due to historical relationships between Nkanu and Nike groups, predating colonialism. This change would lead to Isi Uzo being located in the Enugu East Senatorial District, where it currently stands. In 1981 a Federal College of Education was established in Eha-Amufu the commercial hub of the local government.

== Religion ==
The Isi Uzo Local Government Area is primarily Christian. However, several traditional practices remain like kola nut rituals. Many local villages share veneration of similar ancestral deities, and communities in Ikem have established a familial home in nearby Nike. The most prominent of these traditional practices is the Odo masquerade, based in Isi Uzo. These masks—manufactured in market centers like Neke—are used in masquerades to represent deities who give the living a chance to commune with their dead.

=== Odo Masquerade ===
The creation of these Odo masks and their distribution among nearby communities (in a region known as the igbodo) has allowed the communities within Isi Uzo (like Neke and Nike) to maintain the continuity of their indigenous traditions. The Odo masquerade holds such heavy importance that it is often addressed as Odomangala, literally translated as "a spirit that instills pride in the people it protects". Celebrated biennially, the Odo masquerade also has a "masquerade cult" into which young adults are initiated. During the masquerade, these physical representations of deities known as Odo are allowed to walk naked, and those uninitiated must stay inside. These traditions supposedly cause misunderstandings between Christians and adherents to Odo practices.

== Notable people ==
- Hilary Edeoga (born 1960), professor of plant taxonomy and cytogenetics at the University of Port Harcourt.

== Demographics ==
Isi Uzo is composed of 23 autonomous communities. The largest five are listed below.

- Eha-Amufu
- Ikem
- Neke
- Mbu
- Umualor
