= Aba, Nigeria =

Aba Aba Ngwa (Igbo) Enyimba City
- City
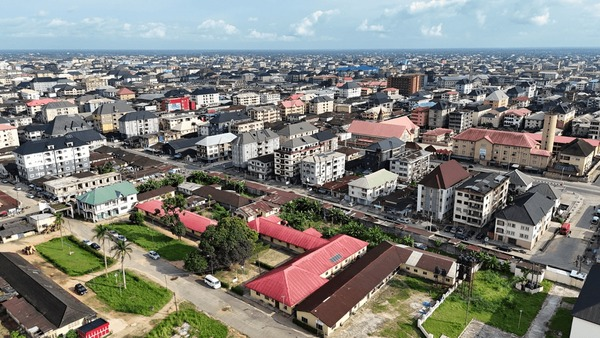
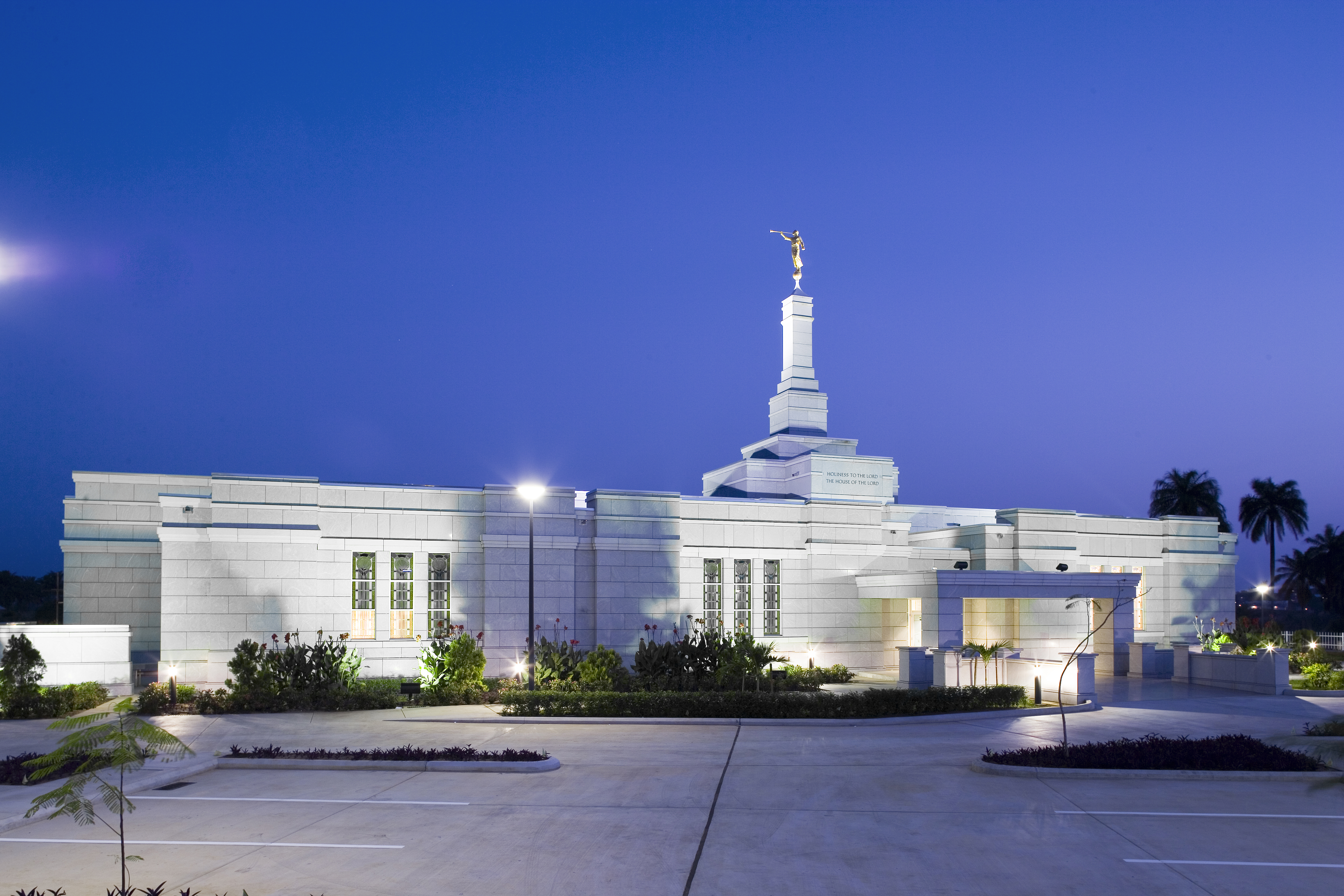
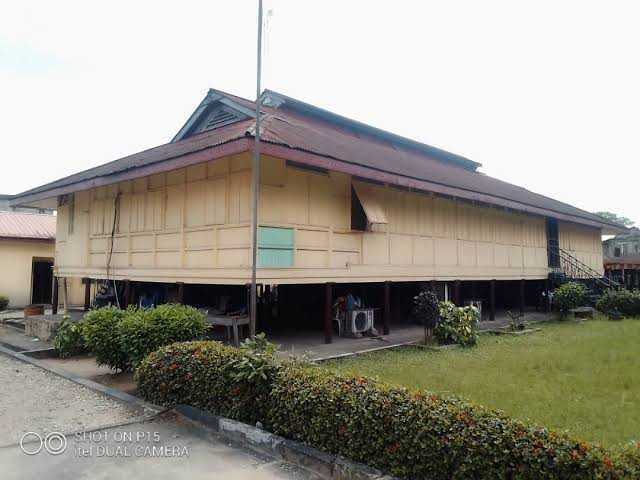
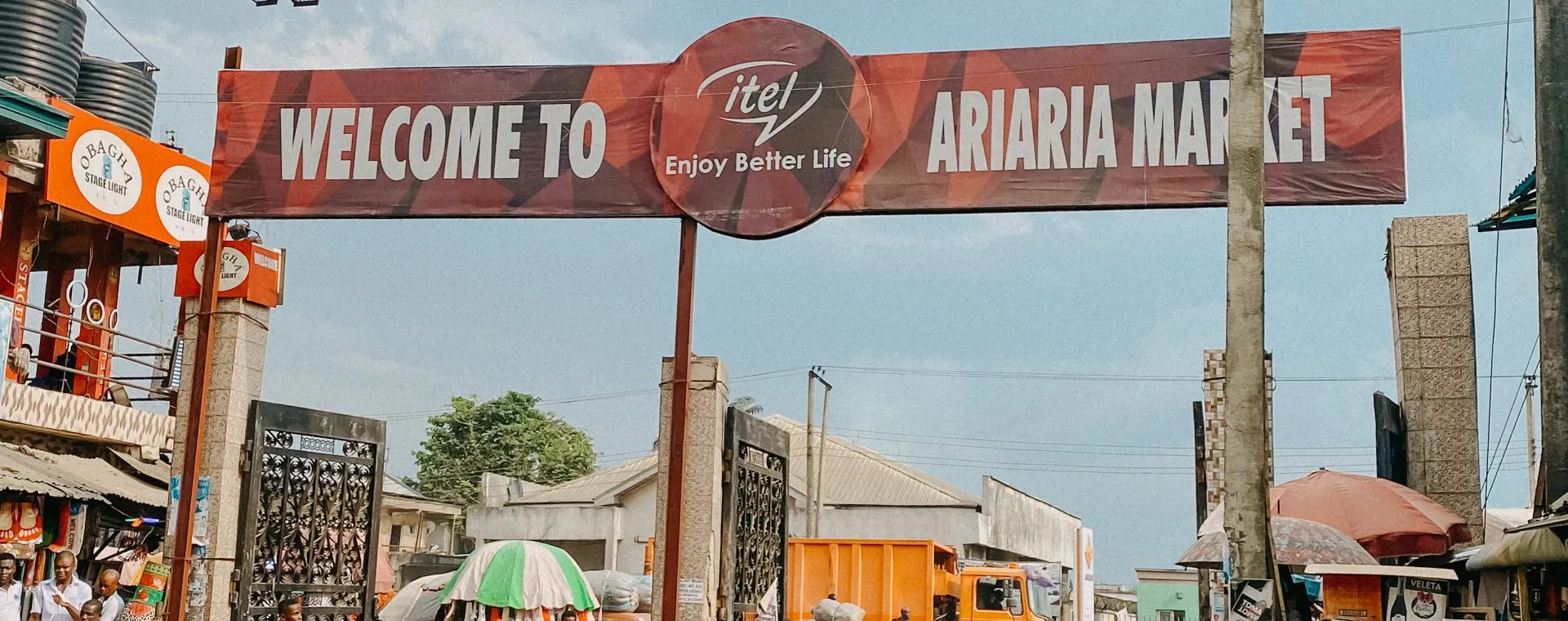
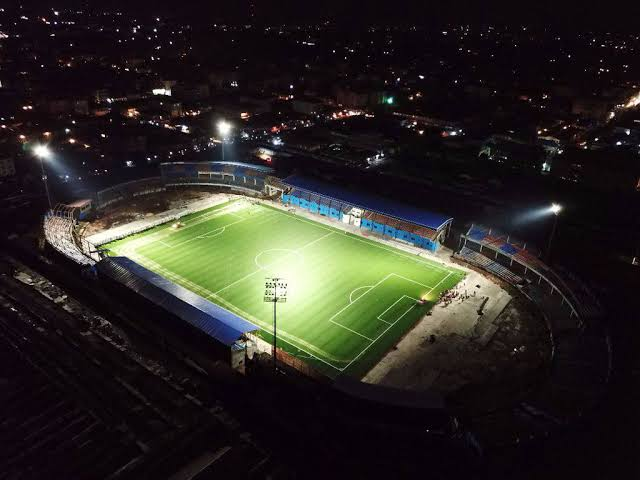
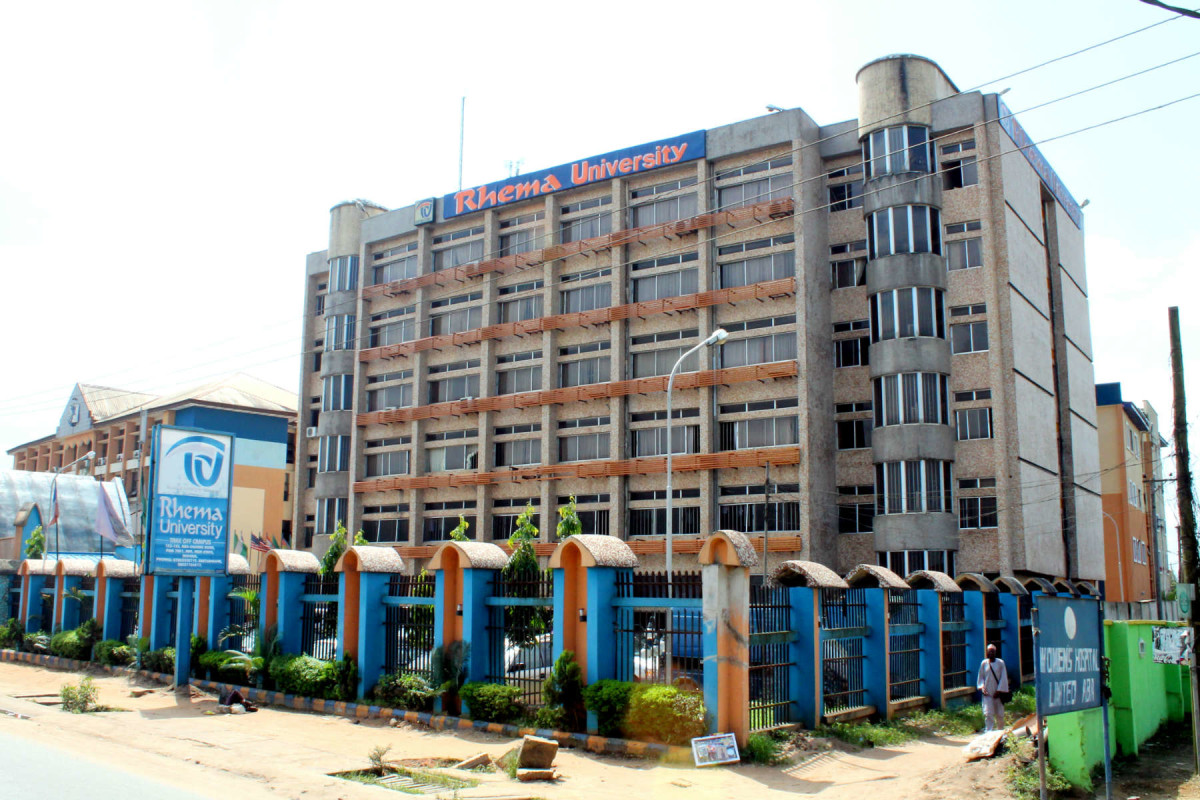
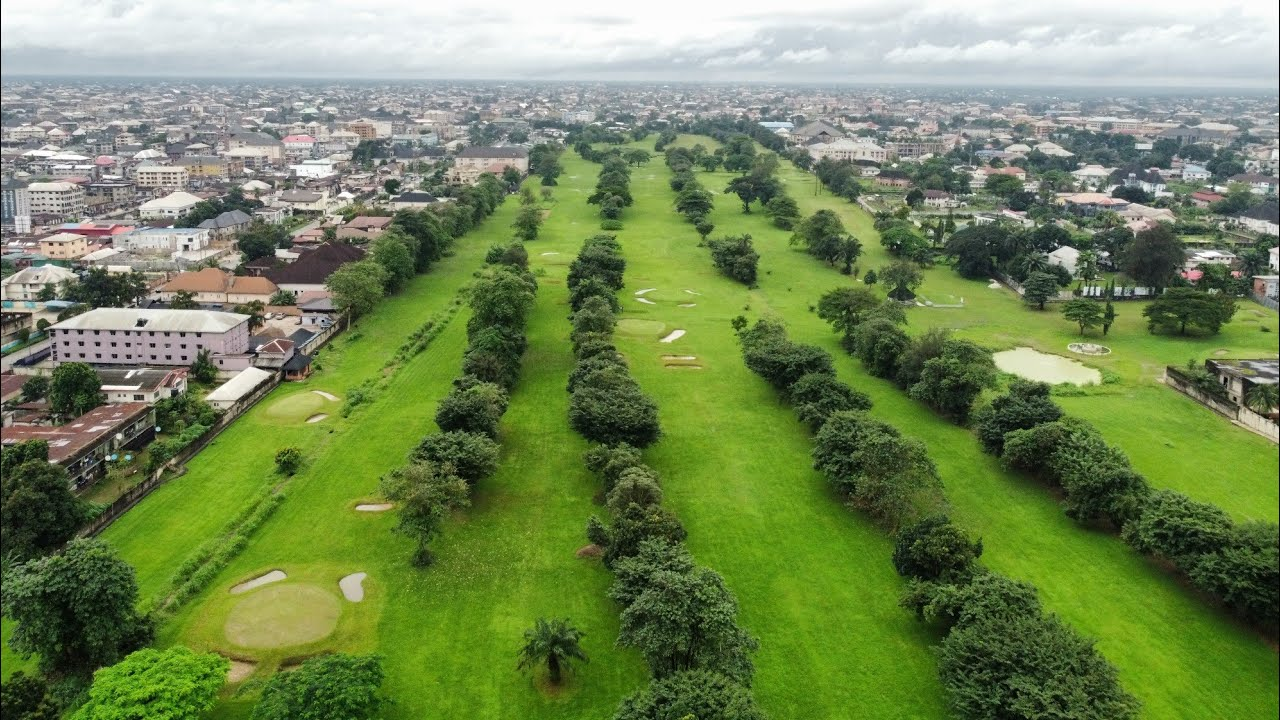
- Aerial view of Aba Aba Nigeria Temple National Museum of Colonial History Ariaria Market Enyimba International Stadium Rhema University Aba Golf Course
- Nickname: Enyimba
- Location in Nigeria
- Coordinates: 5°06′49″N 7°21′56″E
- Country: Nigeria
- State: Abia
- LGA (City): Aba South, Aba North,
- Local Government Areas (Urban): Aba North, Aba South, Osisioma Ngwa, Ugwunagbo, Obingwa.
- Established: 15th Century
- Incorporated (town): Early 20th Century

Government
  - Type: Greater Aba Development Authority (GADA)
  - Governor: Alex Otti (LP)
  - Director General (GADA): Uche Ukeje

Area
  - City: 72 km^{2} (28 sq mi)
  - Urban: 773 km^{2} (298 sq mi)
  - Metro: 1,984 km^{2} (766 sq mi)
- Elevation: 205 m (673 ft)

Population (2006 census)
  - City: 531,340
  - Density: 7,400/km^{2} (19,000/sq mi)
  - Urban: 1,030,121
  - Urban density: 1,330/km^{2} (3,450/sq mi)
  - Metro: 2,534,265
  - Metro density: 1,277/km^{2} (3,308/sq mi)
  - Ethnicity: Igbo
  - Religion: Christianity 90% Omenala 7% Islam 3%

GDP (PPP, 2015 int. Dollar)
  - Year: 2023
  - Total: $13.4 billion
  - Per capita: $11,300
- Time zone: UTC+1 (WAT)
- Postcode: 450
- Area code: 082
- National language: Igbo
- Website: http://www.abiastateonline.com/

Aba is a city in southeastern Nigeria. It lies along the west bank of the Aba River and is at the intersection of roads leading to cities such as Port Harcourt, Owerri, Umuahia, Ikot Ekpene, and Ikot-Abasi.

Aba was established by the Ngwa clan of the Igbo people in Nigeria as a market town. Later, a military post was placed there by the British colonial administration in 1901. The city became a collection point for agricultural products following the construction of a British-made railway running through it to Port Harcourt. Aba is a major urban settlement and commercial centre in Abia State, which is surrounded by small villages and towns. The indigenous people of Aba are the Ngwa. Aba is well known for its craftsmen, and as of 2016, Aba had an estimated population of 2,534,265, making it the biggest city in southeastern Nigeria.

== History ==
The city was initially a trade centre, which eventually became an administrative centre of Britain's colonial government. Aba has been a major commercial centre ever since it became part of British Nigeria.

The Aro Expedition, which was part of a larger military plan to quell anti-colonial sentiment in the region, took place in the area of Aba between 1901 and 1902. During this military action, the British defeated the native Aro people with a presumably large number of casualties. In 1901, the British founded a military post in Aba and in 1915, a railroad was constructed to link it to Port Harcourt, which transported agricultural goods such as palm oil and palm kernels.

In 1929, Aba was the site of a revolt by Igbo women, historically known as Women's War, which was a protest against the colonial taxation policy. The riot started as a peaceful protest against the initial census of women in the region and subsequent assumed taxation of the women based upon rumours. The protests spread throughout the region, but remained peaceful until a pregnant woman was knocked over during a "scuffle", and the lady lost her child. News of this "act of abomination" spread rapidly, and violent reactions ensued. After more protests, a mass of 10,000 women marched on Aba. Sources dispute the casualty rate, with 55 to over 100 deaths being reported. By the 1930s, Aba was becoming a large urban community with an established industrial complex.

During the height of the Nigerian Civil War in 1967, the capital of Biafra was moved to Umuahia from Enugu. Aba was a very strategic Biafran city and was heavily bombed and air-raided during the Civil War.

Upon the creation of Abia State in 1991, the old Aba township was divided into two local government areas, being Aba South and Aba North, while the suburban neighborhood of what was then known as Obioma Ngwa L.G.A. was divided into three L.G.A.s (namely Osisioma Ngwa, Obingwa and Ugwunagbo) for administrative convenience.

Aba is the home of many distinguished families such as the Emejiaka Egbu family of Aba la Ohazu, the Ogbonna family of Eziukwu-Aba, the Ichita family of Umuokpoji-Aba, the Omenihu family of Obuda-Aba, the Ugbor family of Aba-Ukwu, the Ugwuzor family of Umuokpoji Aba, the Ihemadu family of Ohabiam, the Ukaegbu family of Aba-ukwu, the Ahunanya family of Ohabiam, among others.

== Economy ==
Aba is surrounded by oil wells, which separate it from the city of Port Harcourt. A 30 kilometres (19 miles) long pipeline provides Aba with gas from the Imo River natural gas repository. Its major economic contributions are textiles and palm oil, along with pharmaceuticals, plastics, cement, and cosmetics. This trade makes the Ariaria International Market the second largest market in Nigeria after the Onitsha Main Market. There is also a Heineken N.V., a glass-working company and a brewery within the city. Aba is famous for its handicrafts. There are ongoing construction projects in Enyimba Economic Area and Abia State Industrial Innovation Park in Ukwa East and West local government areas to overcome the challenges of unplanned urban sprawl facing the city.

Aba is a commercial hub of eastern Nigeria. There are a few well-known markets, such as Ariaria International Market, Ahia Ohuru Market, and Eziukwu Road Market, among others, that serve the entire region with wares, food, cosmetics, and other material goods.

== Religion ==
The city has remained an important centre for Christian evangelism in Southeastern Nigeria since the arrival of the Church Mission Society (CMS), an evangelism vehicle of the Church of England, by the British.The movement of the evangelist church (All the Saints' church) was birthed from the initiative of three oil traders: Opopo-Joseph Cookey, Gabrial Cookey and Zedekiah Cookey. These men sailed the Aba River in 1896 for trade and evangelism. In 1897, they successfully negotiated with the Abayi and Umuocham people for land to establish their oil business. As their involvement in the oil trade expanded, so too did Christianity spread in Nigeria, and the Cookeys eventually converted the Abayi and Umuocham people to Christianity. From 1901 to 1902 they planned an intensive crusade and invited their landlords. Two congregational churches; one at the Abayi waterfront, and the other at the Umuocham waterfront were constructed as a result, and dedicated by James Johnson. Early converts from the Abayi and Umuocham tribes worshipped at St. Ambrose on the Abayi waterfront until they set up their own churches further inland in 1905. Joseph Cookey and Gabriel Cookey were the volunteer teachers for Abayi and Umuocham respectively.

St. Michael's Cathedral Anglican Church was founded in the late 1920s, although St. James Parish on the Umuleri city limit is arguably the oldest church in the region due to the fact that the diocese's first mass was celebrated in 1916. Most of the primary and secondary schools mentioned below were founded by the CMS along with their associated churches.

Early missionaries who arrived in Nigeria in 1842 established what is now known as the Methodist Church of Nigeria in Badagry. Methodism quickly spread to Uzuakoli and down to Aba. Wesley Cathedral was the first cathedral to be built in Aba. It became a diocese and later an archdiocese which hosted the 2018 Methodist Conference. The Methodist Church is one of the most spiritually vibrant churches in the city of Aba.

The Catholic Church also created many churches; Christ the King Church (C.K.C), which for a long time was the biggest church in the city, became its bishop's seat, and it is now known as Christ the King Cathedral.

With the arrival of the Pentecostal brand of Christianity in Nigeria, the city got an enormous share for itself. The Assemblies of God Church and Deeper Christian Life Ministry had massive followings in the early 1980s, followed by the Refiner's House International Church, one of the newest and fastest-growing Christian ministries in the city. Bishop Ogundoro founded the African Gospel Church . This church is divided into 10 districts. The current bishop of the African Gospel Church is Rev. Dr. Robert Lang'at.

In the late 1960s, a group of Nigerians discovered information on the Church of Jesus Christ of Latter-day Saints and established branches, but this Utah-based church did not establish any official presence in Nigeria until 1978. The first stake of this church in Nigeria (and in fact in all of Africa outside of South Africa) was established in Aba in 1988, with David W. Eka as president. There are presently four LDS stakes headquartered in Aba and the only LDS temple in Nigeria is located in the city, being the Aba Nigeria Temple. There are three other temples announced for Lagos, Benin City, and Eket.

Mosques are also present in Aba; the largest mosque is the Hospital Road Mosque. A Chief Imam resides in the Hausa-speaking settlements at the heart of the city.

== Education ==
Below are some schools in Aba.

Primary schools in Aba
- Ogbor Hill Primary School
- Living Word Magnet Schools
- Aba-Owerri Road Primary School
- Asa Road Primary School
- Asa Triangle Primary School
- Constitution Crescent (Santa Maria) Primary School
- School Road Primary School Aba
- Cameroun Barracks Primary School
- City Primary School
- Township Primary school
- Ohabiam Primary School
- Umuagabai Primary School
- Golf Course Primary School
- St Bridget Primary School
- Abayi Umuocham Primary School
- Abayi Ariaria Primary School
- Ndoki Road Primary School
- Danfodio Road Primary School
- Ehere Road Primary School
- Azikiwe Road Primary School
- Tenant Road Primary School
- Market Road Primary School
- Cameroun Road Primary School
- St. James Model Primary School (private)
- Hospital Road Primary School
- Okigwe Road Primary School
- Omuma Road Primary School
- College Primary School
- 67 Infantry Battalion Primary School, Umule
- Living Stone Int'l Christian Primary School, Ogbor-Hill Aba, Abia State
- Lilac Primary School Ogbor Hil, Aba
- International Early Learning Centre, Umuodu, Abayi Aba
- Eagle Height Academy, 56 Cameroon Road, Abayi Aba
- Daughter of Mary Mother of Mercy Primary School - owned by the catholic church, and is among the first five primary schools in Aba in the 90s alongside St Bridget and international early learning.
Secondary schools in Aba
- Methodist High School, Park Road Aba
- Presbyterian Secondary School, Ogbor Hill Aba
- Living Word Academy Secondary
- Ngwa High School (NHS) or (NAHISCO)
- (Ibo) National High School (NACO)
- Girls' Technical College
- Sacred Heart College Eziukwu Aba (SAHACO)
- Eziama High School (Apostolic Grammar School)
- Wilcox Memorial Comprehensive Secondary School, Ogbor Hill Aba
- All Saints Secondary School, Ehere Aba
- Community Girls Secondary School
- Secondary Technical School
- Nigerian Christian Seminary School
- Boys Technical College [BTC]
- Girls High School, Ogbor Hill.
- Ninlan Demonstration Secondary School.
- Ovom Girls High School, Ovom
- Ohabiam Girls Secondary School, Ohabiam.
- Nneise Community Secondary School, Umuezu.
- St. Joseph College Aba
- Iheorji Secondary School Aba
- Osusu Secondary School Aba
Private schools in Aba
- Living Word Magnet Schools (Nursery/Primary)
- Living Word Academy (Secondary)
- Honourables International School
- St. James Model School (Hosts JAMB and other graduate exams)
- Premier International Secondary School
- New Breed International Schools
- Evangel Seminary
- Alberto Model School
- Dority International Secondary School (Hosts SAT and TOEFL exams for foreign colleges)
- St Bridget High School
- St Anthony Comprehensive Secondary School Aba.
- Living Stone International Christian Secondary School, Ogbor-Hill Aba, Abia State
- Living Word Academy Secondary, Abayi, Aba.
- D-nals High school, Opobo Rd Aba.
- Rich Devos International High School, Aba.
- Presbyterian secondary school, Ehere, Aba.
- Awesome International Model Secondary School, Abayi Aba.
- Infotech Demonstration School Aba.
- Stella Maris Secondary School aba.
- merit base international Christian school Aba
- St. Joseph College Aba
- Intellectual Giants Christian Academy
- Modern Child College Aba
- St. Augustine's Model Academy, Ogbor Hill, Aba.
- Lilac Comprehensive Secondary School, Ogbor Hill, Aba
- Hawics International School
Tertiary schools in Aba

The tertiary schools are:

- Abia State University Teaching Hospital
- Abia State Polytechnic
- Covenant Polytechnic
- School of Health Technology
- Redemption College of Education (privately owned)
- Rhema University, Aba Take-off site (also privately owned by Living Word Ministries)
- Infotech College of Technology (privately owned)
- Cyberspot Institute of Information Technology (privately owned)
- Living Word Institute of Information Technology (privately owned)
- IMO state university extension in nursing school off Mosque Road

== Sports ==
Enyimba F.C., popularly called The Peoples Elephant, is the city's most popular association football club. Enyimba F.C.'s winning record is among the highest of all Nigerian football clubs. With two CAF Champions League trophies, nine Nigeria Premier League titles and a pair of Nigerian Federation Cup trophies, the club is currently ranked second in the CAF Club rankings for Nigeria.

== Services ==
Aba is served by a station on Nigerian Railways, but this station is rarely used. Aba is also a major hub for road transport in the region—a large number of transport companies operate coaches that transport people daily to various parts of the country. The city is second only to Onitsha in mass transportation daily volume within eastern Nigeria. Commercial motorcycles have been banned in the region and are being replaced by commercial tricycles popularly referred to as Keke and a minibus service. This minibus service is a popular means of transportation nowadays.

In 2012, a monorail system was proposed for the city. The plan was criticised as a potential scam, as the private company involved in the project had no experience in developing monorails. As of 2021, there is no information that the proposal progressed past the signing of a memorandum of understanding.

The management of waste in Aba is primarily overseen by the Abia State Environmental Protection Agency (ASEPA). Although faced with significant challenges that are compounded by rapid urbanization and population growth the recent administration of Dr Alex Otti has had much greater success in solving waste management in the city, with one refuse dumps being cleared all over the city.

Aba is powered by the Enugu Electricity Distribution Company, which was created by the division of the Nigerian Electricity Power Authority. On 24 February 2024, a new power plant operated by electrical company Geometric Power Company was inaugurated by Bola Tinubu. Aba Power Limited Electric, the newest electricity distribution company in Nigeria, is expected to take electricity from the new plant and supply 9 of the 17 Local Government Areas of Abia State, including Aba. It is expected that the daily hours of available electricity in the city will rise, and the electric generator will become a household item. For some places in Aba, an electric generator will be the only source of electricity due to remoteness or other factors.

== Climate ==
Aba has a mainly tropical climate. Most months of the year see significant rainfall, and the brief dry season has little impact. The weather in the region is classified as Am in the Köppen climate classification system. Aba's yearly mean temperature is 25.6 °C (78.1 °F). The annual precipitation of the city clocks in to about 2,747 millimetres (108.1 in).

Due to Aba's proximity to the equator, the city is in a summer-like state most of the year. January, February, March, April, May, November, and December are considered ideal months to travel.

== See also ==
- Enyimba International Stadium
- Ariaria International Market
