= Edward Ikem Okeke =

Nigerian politician (1942–1995)

- Education: Methodist College, Uzuakoli; Cambridge University
- Occupation: Union Leader
- Notable work: He served as Deputy President of the Nigerian People's Redemption Party during the Nigerian second republic

Edward Ikem Okeke (August 1, 1942 in British Colony and Protectorate of Nigeria – July 2, 1995 in Anambra State, Federal Republic of Nigeria) was a Soviet educated, left wing Nigerian politician, academic, and trade union leader. He served as Deputy President of the Nigerian People's Redemption Party during the Nigerian second republic and as a member of the governing board for the University of Sokoto, now Usmanu Danfodiyo University, Sokoto. After Dr. Okeke and S.G Ikoku defected to the NPN, Dr. Okeke served as Special Advisor to President Shehu Shagari, and as Chairman of the Nigerian Presidential Taskforce on Rice.

Okeke was born to Sir Edward Ikem Okeke of Nnewi, a powerful landed gentry from Nnewi in southeastern Nigeria and kinsman to Sir Louis Phillippe Odumegwu (father to Ojukwu Chukwuemeka Odumegwu-Ojukwu, who was President of the short lived Republic of Biafia).

== Education ==
Okeke was home schooled by private tutors before being sent off to boarding school at Methodist College, Uzuakoli. He graduated with his Cambridge University A Levels in 1959. From 1959 through 1971, he studied and conducted academic research both in the United Kingdom and Russia. In 1971, he was awarded a Doctor of Medicine, from the renowned 2nd Medical University in Moscow, now the Russian National Research Medical University.

== Criticism ==
Okeke was criticized by E.C Amuchie, in his book, ASIKA: An Intellectual in Government, for being part of the Nigerian intellectual social class, that acted as front men, for political parties, that were not interested in the plight of the average Nigerian, but interested in consolidating power and wealth within the Nigerian elite.

== Gang of Three ==
Okeke, Senator Uche Chukwumerije, and Mazi SG Ikoku, were considered the intellectual voices, and front leaders, for three major Nigerian political parties during the Nigerian Second Republic. The fact that all three men were childhood friends, members of the Igbo clan, and graduates of Nigerian-English styled prep schools, fueled the belief during Nigeria's second republic, that the Nigerian political system was geared towards the rich.
