= Neke, Isi-Uzo =

Town in Enugu State, Southeastern Nigeria

Neke
- Town
- Interactive map of Neke
- Coordinates: 6.779°N 7.664°E
- Country: Nigeria
- State: Enugu State
- Time zone: UTC+1 (WAT)
- Postal code: 412105

Neke Mkpọpụta is a town located in Isi-Uzo Local Government Area of Enugu State in South Eastern Nigeria. It is bordered by Ugwuogo Nike (Nike Lake Resort) to the south, Ikem (Local Government Area Headquarters) to the east, Mbu to the west, Eha Amufu and UmuAlor to the southeast, Obolo-Eke to the north, Ogbodu-Abaa to the northwest, and Opi to the southwest. Neke has a population of about 55,000.

== Geography ==
Neke is located between two major cities, Enugu and Nsukka. It serves as an access point to traders and commuters travelling along the Enugu-Nsukka Axis.

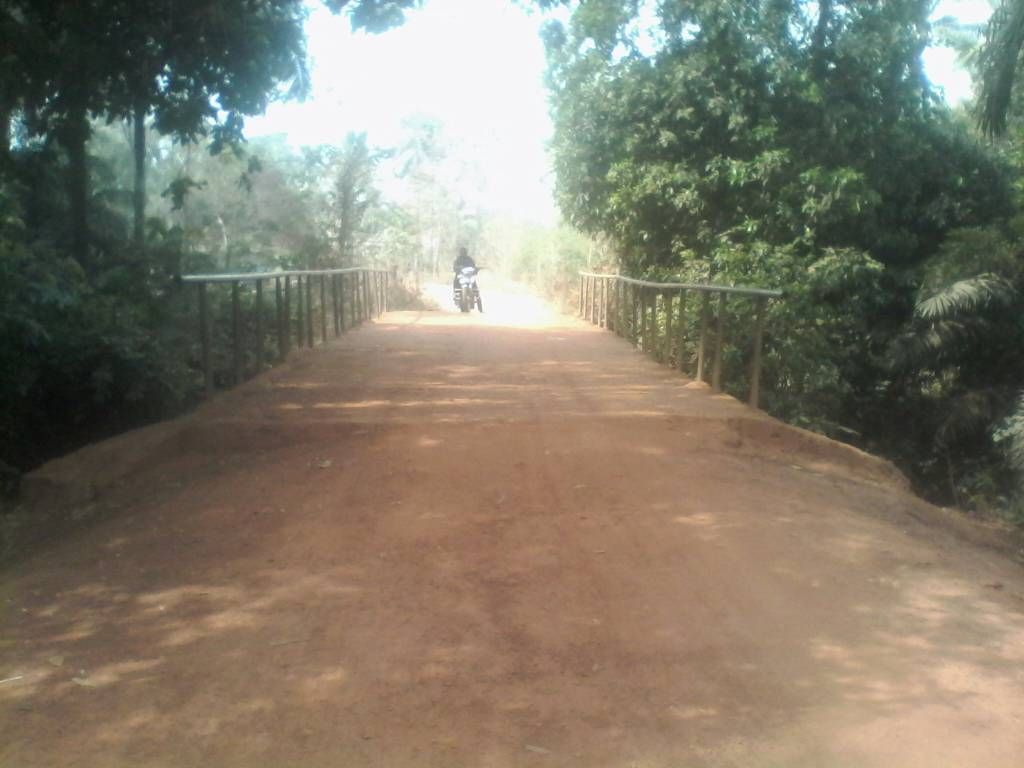
Bridge over the Amanyi River in Neke

Neke town has five main districts: Ishienu, Akpani, Obeguaba, Umugwu and Umuegwu. In the present day, many new settlements have sprung up in various parts of the large expanse of land that belongs to the town. These new settlements include Agudene Neke, Onueme Neke, Uzo-Ohu Neke, Ugwuakparata Neke, and Mburuamanyi Neke. Recently, the Enugu State government created five new autonomous communities within Neke town. The new communities are Akpani Autonomous community, Uno-Neke Autonomous community, Emeora Autonomous community, Ndiagu Autonomous community, and Mburu Amanyi Autonomous community. Each of these autonomous communities has a tradition ruler called an Igwe.

== Politics ==
As part of Isi-Uzo Local Government Area, Neke is within the Enugu East Senatorial Zone although prior to 1996 Isi-Uzo prominently belonged to the Nsukka geopolitical area. In 1976, Chief Sam Nwaroh, a prominent son of Neke was appointed as the first local government chairman of Isi-Uzo. The late Chief Nwaroh later served as a member of the House of Representatives and the first Igwe of Neke.

== Language and culture ==
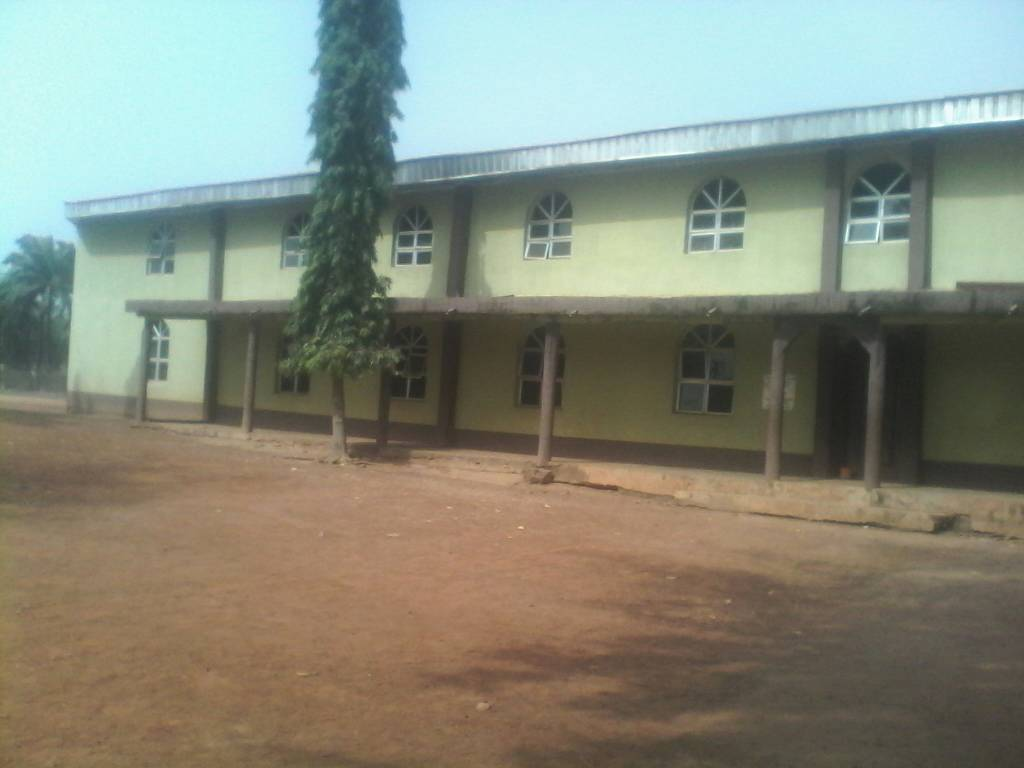
St. Stephens Anglican Church, Neke

In the pre-colonial era, the people of Neke were known as fearsome warriors who had an economic stronghold on neighboring areas.

The people of Neke speak a very distinct dialect of Igbo, a mix of the Enugu and Nsukka dialects.

The people typically practice both Christianity and traditional religions and, although Christianity has increasingly replaced many traditional or ancestral practices. The two main Christian churches in Neke are the Anglican Church at St. Stephens and Catholic Church at St. Patrick's Parish.

The people of Neke celebrate annual festivals called Onwa-Asaa, Aju, Igwokoji, Ote Mgbereke, Igede, and Okanga.

The community uses the traditional titles Oha and the Igwe. The Oha the eldest man in the community while Igwe is the royal father of the community.

Each village within Neke worships a different ancestral god. Ishienu has Akpasuru, Akpani has Egu-Amagu ukaduucho, Umu-Ugwu had Edeawogu nwa-ngwere, Umu-Egwu has Omegu-Omaru Umu-Eji, and Obeguabo had Otu nkpume obegabo.

== Economy ==
A majority of the local population of Neke are farmers. Neke’s major crops are yam, palm oil and cassava, which are sold at the two main markets: Nkwo and Ore. The Nkwo market is the most popular due to its location at the town center.

== Education ==
- St. Patrick's Mission Community Primary School
- Community Secondary School, Neke
- Isi-Uzo Technical College, Ikem-Neke

== Postal codes ==
- Akpani: 412105
- Isienu: 412105
- Obegu-Aba: 412105
- Umuegwu: 412105
- Umugwu: 412105
