= Michael Okpara University of Agriculture =

Agricultural university in Umudike, Nigeria

Coordinates: 5°28′50.39″N 7°32′44.48″E

Michael Okpara University of Agriculture, Umudike
- Motto: Knowledge, Food and Security
- Type: Public
- Established: 1992
- Chancellor: His Royal Highness Alhaji Abubakar Shehu Abubakar 3rd
- Vice-Chancellor: Prof. Ursula Ngozi Akanwa
- Location: Umudike (main campus), Abia State, Nigeria
- Campus: Urban
- Colors: Green and yellow
- Nicknames: Umudykes, U'dykers
- Website: http://www.mouau.edu.ng/

Michael Okpara University of Agriculture Entrance.

The Michael Okpara University of Agriculture, originally the Federal University of Agriculture, is a federal university in Umudike, Abia State, Nigeria was established as a specialized university by a Federal Government of Nigeria Decree No 48 of November 1992. It began formal activities in May 1993 with the appointment of the first Council and Vice-Chancellor Professor Placid C. Njoku on 27 May 1993, while other key officials of the university were appointed later.

The first set of students were admitted into the institution during the 1993/94 academic year with a student population of 82.

The nickname "Umudykes" or "U'dykers" is used for students, alumni, and sports teams of the university.

== Vice Chancellors ==
Several vice chancellors have served the school for a non-renewable period of five years.

1. Professor Placid Njoku (1993 – 1999)
2. Professor Ogbonnaya Onwudike (January 2000 – February 2006)
3. Professor Ikenna Onyido (March 2006 – February 2011)
4. Professor Hillary O. Edeoga (March 2011 – February 2016)
5. Professor Francis Otunta (March 1st 2016 – March 2021)
6. Professor Mmaduebisi Ofo Iwe (March 2021 –March 2026 )
7. Professor Ursula Ngozi Akanwa (March 2026-)

== Location ==
The institution is located in the Agricultural Training and Research city of Umudike, about 10 kilometers from Umuahia (capital of Abia State).

== See also ==
- List of universities in Nigeria
- Education in Nigeria
