= Francis Otunta =

Nigerian mathematician and academic administrator (1958–2021)

Former Vice-Chancellor of Michael Okpara University of Agriculture
- In office 1 March 2016 – 1 March 2021
- Appointed by: MOUAU Governing Council
- Preceded by: Hilary Edeoga
- Succeeded by: Maduebibisi Iwe

Personal details
- Born: Francis Ogbonnaya Otunta; 29 April 1958 Afikpo, Ebonyi State, Nigeria
- Died: 30 March 2021 (aged 62)
- Spouse: Bertha Otunta
- Children: 6
- Occupation: Academic

Francis Ogbonnaya Otunta (29 April 1958 – 30 March 2021) was a Nigerian mathematician and academic administrator. He was the fifth Vice-Chancellor of Michael Okpara University of Agriculture upon his appointment in December 2015.

== Career ==
Prior to his appointment as 5th Vice-Chancellor of Michael Okpara University of Agriculture, Otunta had previously worked as a Professor of Mathematics at the University of Benin. He was also a former Rector of Akanu Ibiam Federal Polytechnic, Unwana, a post he held from 2006–2014. Prof. Francis O. Otunta took the mantle of leadership as the Vice-Chancellor of Michael Okpara University of Agriculture, Umudike from Prof. Hillary Edeoga officially on 1 March 2016.

== Personal life ==
Otunta hailed from Amangwu Nkpoghoro Village in Afikpo North Local Government Area of Ebonyi State, Nigeria. He was married to Bertha Otunta with whom he had six children.

== Death ==
He died in a vehicle accident and was buried on 10 September 2021, in Afikpo.

== See also ==
- List of people from Ebonyi State
