= Ursula Ngozi Akanwa =

Nigerian Academic

Micheeal Okpara University of Agriculture, Umudike Vice Chancellor
- Incumbent
- Assumed office 2026

Personal details
- Born: Gusau, Zamfara State
- Education: University of Nigeria, Nsukka; Federal University of Technology, Owerri; Abia State University, Uturu.
- Occupation: Academic
- Profession: Academic

Ursula Ngozi Akanwa is a Nigerian professor of educational measurement and evaluation and the currently serving as the 7th vice chancellor of Micheal Okpara University Umudike.

== Early life and education ==
Akanwa was born in Gusau but a native of Imo State. She received her elementary education from Community Primary School, Agbala, Owerri. She then proceeded to Girls’ Secondary School, Emekuku, Owerri where she obtained her senior secondary school certificate in 1979. She received her first degree from University of Nigeria, Nsukka in 1984. She obtained her Masters degree in Measurement and Evaluation in 1991 and doctorate in 2008.

== Career ==
In 2011, Akanwa became a staff of Micheal Okpara University as an Associate Professor and eventually became a professor in 2014. In 2026, she became the vice chancellor of the institution after serving as the deputy vice chancellor of research and development of the institution.
