= Hilary Edeoga =

Nigerian academic (born 1960)

Prof. Hilary Edeoga

4th Vice-Chancellor of Michael Okpara University of Agriculture
- In office March 1, 2011 – 2016
- Appointed by: MOUAU Governing Council
- Succeeded by: Francis Otunta

Enugu State Commissioner for Agriculture and Natural Resources
- In office 2007–2009

Personal details
- Born: Hilary Edeoga Odo; November 28, 1960 (age 65) Eha Amafu, Isi Uzo, Enugu State, Nigeria
- Spouse: Georgina Bizugbe Edeoga
- Children: 3
- Education: University of Port Harcourt
- Occupation: academic; researcher

Hilary Edeoga Odo (born November 28, 1960) is a Nigerian academic and professor of plant taxonomy and cytogenetics. He served as the fourth substantive Vice-Chancellor of Michael Okpara University of Agriculture from 2011 to 2016.

== Early life and education ==
Being born into the family of Chief and Mrs. Edeoga Ogenyi Eze in Eha Amafu, an autonomous community in Isi Uzo local government area of Enugu State, Edeoga had his secondary school education at Patrick's Secondary School (Emene High School) and Abakaliki High School, Presco respectively between 1974 and 1979. He proceeded to the University of Port Harcourt where he obtained a B.Sc. certificate in Botany in 1985, a M.Sc. certificate in 1989 and then a Ph.D. in 1991 all from the same university.

== Career ==
Edeoga first worked as a senior lecturer at Bendel State University, Ekpoma from 1988 to 1999. He has served in various academic and political positions including serving as deputy vice-chancellor of Michael Okpara University of Agriculture from 2001 to 2005 and then commissioner for agriculture and natural resources in Enugu State from 2007 to 2009. On December 20, 2010, he was appointed the fourth substantive vice-chancellor of Michael Okpara University of Agriculture, a position he held till 2016. Edeoga is a member of professional bodies, including the American Society of Plant Taxonomists and the Nigerian Society for Experimental Biology.
