= O. C. Onwudike =

Nigerian professor and administrator

- Born: Ogbonnaya Chikwe Onwudike; 12 October 1947 (age 78); Bende, Abia State, Nigeria
- Education: University of Ibadan (B.Sc, PhD)
- Spouse: Nwakaku Onwudike
- Children: 5

Ogbonnaya Chikwe Onwudike (born 12 October 1947) is a Nigerian academic who serves as the vice-chancellor of Rhema University. He had served as the vice-chancellor of Michael Okpara University of Agriculture from 2001 to 2006.

== Early life and education ==
Onwudike was born in Bende local government area of Abia State on 12 October 1947. He attended Methodist College Uzuakoli in 1960 and acquired his West African School Certificate in 1964 and his Cambridge High School Certificate in 1966. He furthered his education at Obafemi Awolowo University (then called the University of Ife), Ile-Ife in 1970 and graduated with a degree in Agriculture in 1973. Upon graduating, Onwudike was posted to Sabon-Gida, Jemma in the then North Central State for his National Youth Service Corps (NYSC) programme.

After the one year NYSC programme, Onwudike started his M.Phil. programme for Animal Science through the University of Ife Scholarship Programme but was soon converted to a PhD programme by the university administrators. He completed his PhD programme in 1978.

In 1980, through a fellowship at the International Atomic Energy Agency, Onwudike attended Colorado State University for postdoctoral training on the use of nuclear techniques in animal production and was offered a fellowship from the Matsumae International Foundation Fellowship for Research at Nagoya University in 1986.

== Career ==
=== Academics ===
In 1975, Onwudike was made a graduate assistant, a lecturer II, and soon became an assistant professor in 1985 all at the University of Ife. As an assistant professor, Onwudike was transferred from Ile-Ife to Federal University of Technology, Owerri (FUTO) in October 1991 and was appointed a full professor on 1 July 1994 while at Federal University of Agriculture (now Michael Okpara University of Agriculture), Umudike.

While at Umudike, he served as the first dean of the College of Animal Science and Animal Health from 1994 to 1996 and the first deputy vice chancellor from 1996 to 1999. Onwudike served as the acting vice-chancellor of MOU from January 2000 to January 2001 and from 1 February 2001 to 31 January 2006, the vice-chancellor succeeding Professor Placid Njoku.

Onwudike is currently a professor of Animal Nutrition and Biochemistry in the Faculty of Agriculture at Rhema University, Obeama-Asa - Rivers State and its current vice-chancellor.

=== Others ===
Onwudike was from 1987 to 1990 the Commissioner for Agriculture and Natural Resources at the Old Imo State (comprising present-day Imo State, Abia State and Afikpo) and the chairman of the Imo State Agricultural and Development Project.

== Honours ==
In 1981, Onwudike was inducted as a fellow of New York Academy of Sciences.

== Personal life ==
Onwudike is married to Nwakaku Onwudike who is a pharmacist, and they have five children together.
