= Rhema University =

Christian university in Aba, Nigeria

Coordinates: 5.14331°N 7.34091°E

- RU
- Motto: Equipping Humanity for Excellence
- Type: Private
- Established: 2009
- Affiliations: BAU R&D Network
- Chancellor: Emmanuel O. Okorie
- Vice-Chancellor: O. C. Onwudike
- Location: Aba, Abia State, Nigeria
- Campus: Take-Off -Urban
- Colours: Blue and Orange
- Website: Official website

Rhema University, Aba (RU) is an accredited private, Christian university based in the city of Aba in Abia State, Nigeria. Founded by the Living Word Ministries International and licensed by the National Universities Commission in 2009.

The current vice-chancellor of the university is Professor O.C. Onwudike.

In 2004 the Living Word Ministries constituted a planning and Implementation Committee towards starting a Rhema University. In 2009 the university received its license to operate as a private university in Nigeria, and admitted its first cohort of students. In September 2014, the university graduated its first set of students, and in January 2015 it signed an Equity Investment Agreement with BAU Research and Development and joined its Network of Institutions.
