= Maduebibisi Iwe =

Nigerian academic, author, and professor of Food Science and Extrusion Technology

Maduebibisi Ofo Iwe
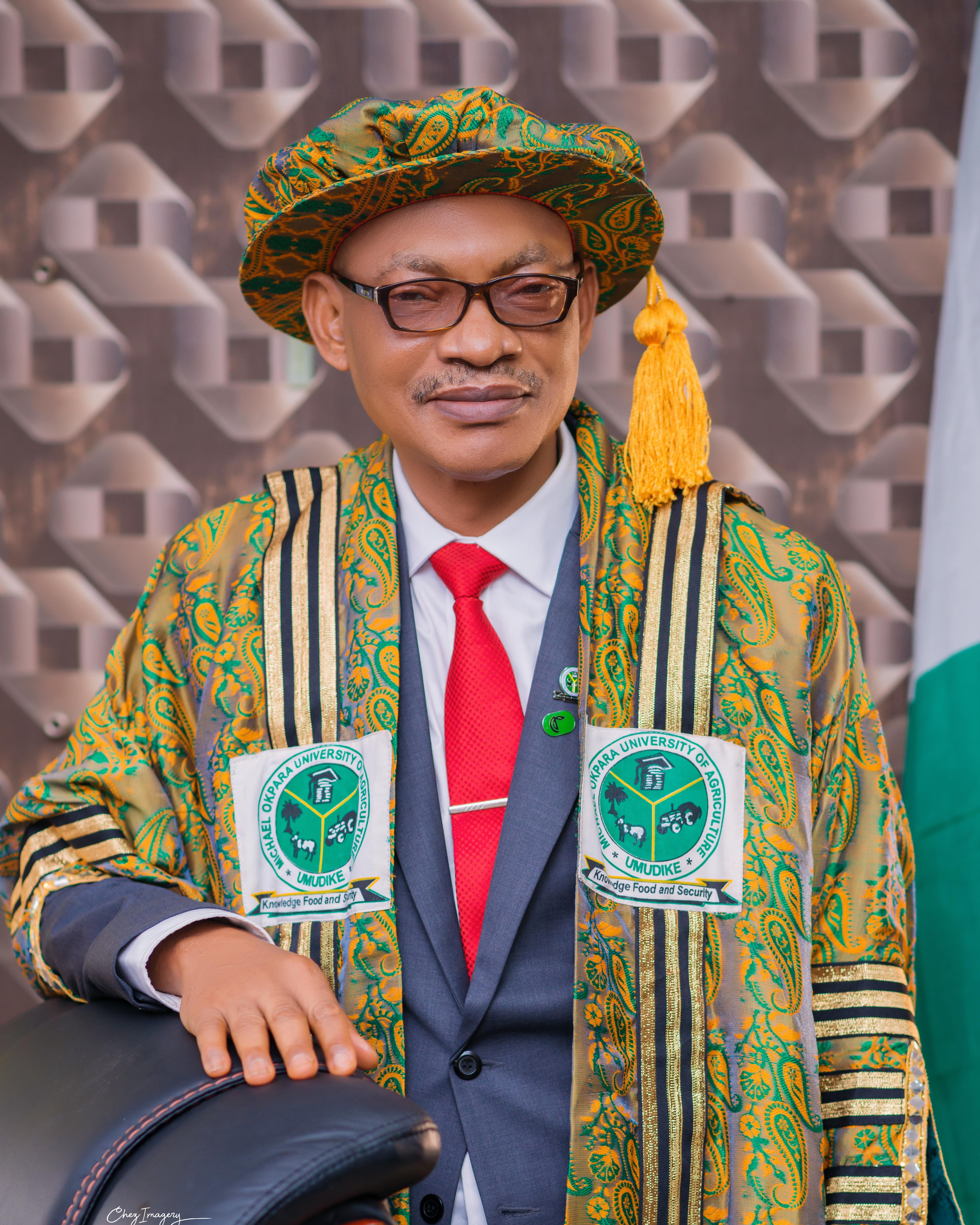

6th Vice-Chancellor of Michael Okpara University of Agriculture
- Incumbent
- Assumed office March 1, 2021
- Appointed by: University Governing Council (December 16, 2020)
- Preceded by: Francis Otunta

Personal details
- Born: April 7, 1958 (age 68)
- Spouse: Nkechinyere Nkem Iwe
- Children: 4
- Education: University of Nigeria, Nsukka; University of Ibadan
- Occupation: Academic; Researcher
- Profession: Academic

Maduebibisi Ofo Iwe (born April 7, 1958) is a Nigerian academic, author, and Professor of Food Science and Extrusion Technology. He is serving as the sixth substantive Vice-Chancellor of Michael Okpara University of Agriculture, Umudike. He assumed office on 1 March 2021.

== Early life and education ==
Iwe studied at the University of Nigeria Nsukka where he obtained a Bachelor's (Honors) degree and Ph.D. in Food Science and Technology. He also obtained an MSc in Food Technology from the University of Ibadan. His Ph.D. research took him as far as the Wageningen Agricultural University, The Netherlands, through a World Bank/NUC sponsorship.

== Career ==
Iwe took up a lectureship job at the University of Jos, Makurdi Campus (now University of Agriculture, Makurdi) in 1985 and rose to the rank of a Senior Lecturer in 1997, before joining the Michael Okpara University of Agriculture Umudike in 2000.

He was promoted to the rank of a professor in 2003. Prior to being appointed the Vice-Chancellor of the university in 2020, he held several administrative and management positions in the institution: Head of Department, Deputy Dean of Faculty, Dean of Faculty, Dean of Student Affairs, Chairman of Examinations, and Timetable Committee, Member of Governing Council, Ag. Deputy Vice-Chancellor and Deputy Vice-Chancellor (Academic) Of Michael Okpara University of Agriculture. He has authored more than 70 articles, monographs, and books.

Iwe is a member of the Institute of Food Technologists (IFT), Chicago, USA, and International Union of Food Science and Technology (IUFoST), a Fellow of the Nigerian Institute of Food Science and Technology (NIFST), member of the Nigerian Soybean Association, and a Professional Member of the Institute of Public Analysts of Nigeria (IPAN).

He is an Internationally Certified Food Scientist (CFS) and an alumnus of the Haggai Institute, United States, where he obtained an Advanced Leadership Certificate in Evangelism and Christian Leadership. In October 2020, he was elected National President of the Nigerian Institute of Food Science and Technology (NIFST).

== Community service ==
Iwe is a resource person on the Soybean Utilization, a resource person on UNICEF Household Food Security, and was a member of Benue State Committee on Vitamin A deficiency control. He was a resource person for the 1st Abia State Council of Health and Development Policy Plan, 17–19 December 2003. Consultant to NICCUS Industries Ltd, Onitsha, 2004–2009. Advised on the establishment of analytical laboratories in the industry, made recommendations on recruitment of staff, and advised on processing lines.

Iwe was a member of the TETFUND Technical Advisory Group (TAG) of TETFUND Book Development Committee (2009-2017) and was a board member of the SHEDA Science and Technology in the Federal Ministry of Science and Technology (2013 2015).

== Editorship of Academic Journal ==
He served as the Editor-in-Chief of the Nigerian Food Journal (2007-2010), an official publication of the Nigerian Institute of Food Science and Technology] (NIFST).

== Personal life ==
Iwe is a Christian and is serving his second term as the National Council Chairman of Scripture Union Nigeria. He is married to Nkechinyere Nkem Iwe, a Director at the Federal Ministry of Defence, and they have four children.
