= Ulli Beier Museum =

Museum in Nigeria

- Location: Osogbo, Nigeria
- Coordinates: 7.7875°N 4.5087°E
- Founders: Ulli Beier and Susanne Wenger

Ulli Beier Museum is an art gallery and art school in Osogbo, Nigeria. It was established by the artists Ulli Beier and Susanne Wenger. Today it is a contemporary African art gallery, hosting the work of talented and aspiring artists from the Osogbo area and across Nigeria.
