= Kaduna Museum =

Museum in Kaduna, Nigeria

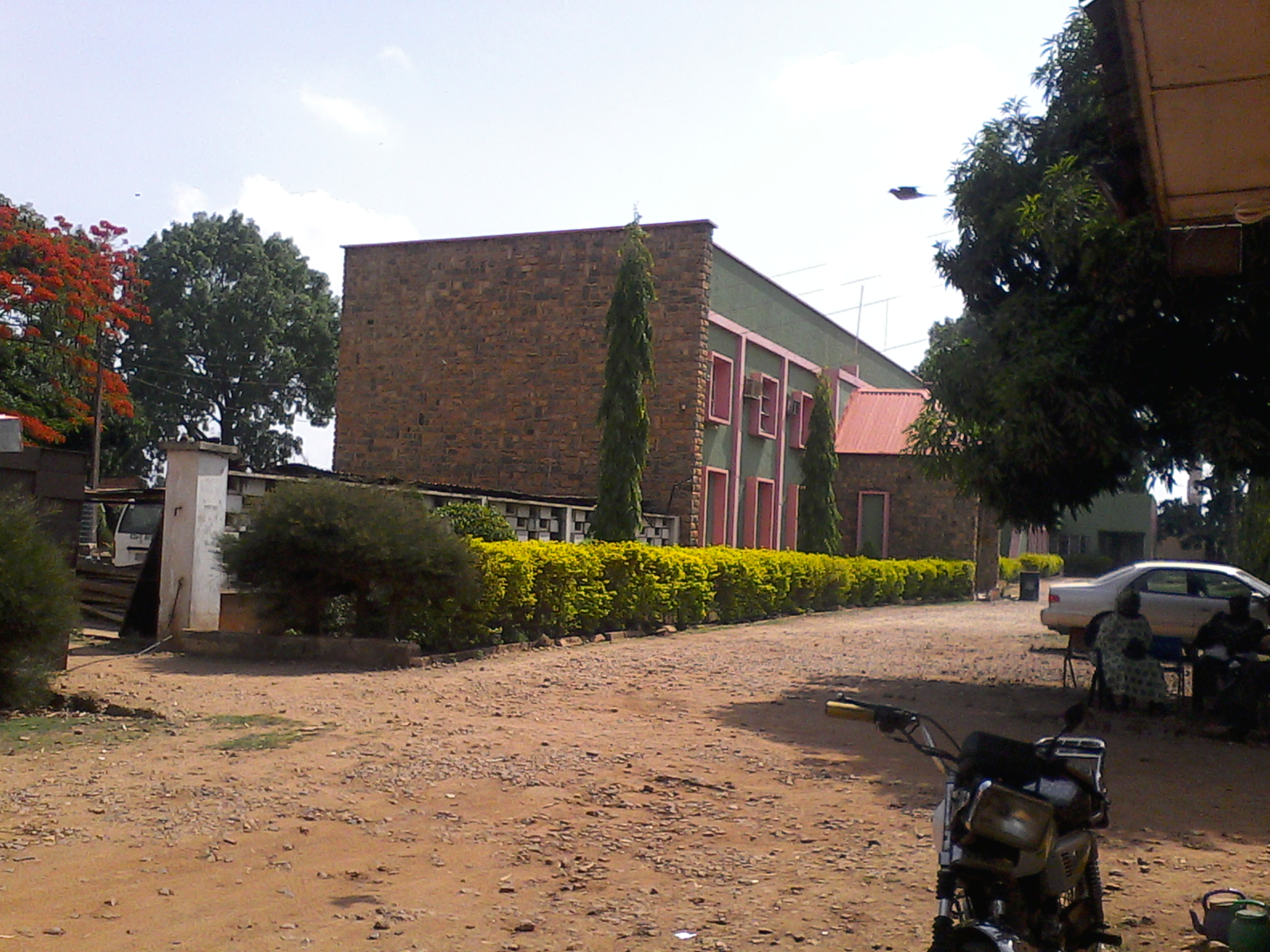
- Established: 1975
- Location: Kaduna, Nigeria.
- Coordinates: 10.54847°N 7.44234°E
- Collections: substantial collection of archaeological, ethnolographic and crafts exhibits and has a live crafts centre in which traditional craftsmen and women can be observed making crafts

Kaduna Museum is a museum in Kaduna, Nigeria. The museum was opened in 1975 following the donation of the old Northern People's Congress (NPC) building by the North Central State Government. The Museum is located along Ali Akilu Road in Ugawana Sarki, Kanduna. The Kaduna Museum contains a substantial collection of archaeological, ethnographic and crafts exhibits and has a live crafts center in which traditional craftsmen and women can be observed making crafts.

== Building ==
The Museum is located along Ali Akilu Road in Ungawan Sarki, Kaduna. It operates in the former Northern People's Congress (NPC) building, which was donated by North Central State Government in 1975 to establish the museum.

== Collection ==
The Museum holds archaeological, ethnographic, historical and artistic collection.
