= Methodist College Uzuakoli =

Coordinates: 5.62108°N 7.56431°E

The Methodist College of Uzuakoli is a college in Abia, Nigeria.

== History ==
A group of missionaries of the Primitive Methodist Church of Great Britain founded the Uzuakoli Institute (UI) in 1923. In 1931, it was renamed Methodist College. According to the records, the group of missionaries who established the College was led by Rev. Herbert Lewis Octavia Williams, its first principal.

At various times from inception to 1959, British missionaries administered the college. These included Rev. Hardy, Rev. Carver, Rev. Aggrey, Rev. Woods, Rev. McGarr, Rev. William (Bill) H. Spray, and Rev. E. Bernard Hall, who arrived in 1959 to be the last European missionary to serve as principal. In his final period of service in 1963, he stepped down to be deputy principal and servedg under Mr Kanu Achinivu, the first Nigerian-born principal of the college.

In recent history, the following men have served: Mr. Onokala, Mr. Anyaoha, Mr. Chukwu Ogbonnaya, Mr. Nwauche, Godwin O. O. Uzoechi, Mr C. N. Ukanwoke, Dr. Chukwumereije and Chief Sir Mike Emezue (D O B), who became the Principal of the College from 2008-2012. As a result of the handing over of some secondary schools to their original owners by the Abia State Governor, Chief T A. Orji, Methodist College Uzuakoli was returned to the Methodist Mission Nigeria on 14 September 2012. In 2013, the principal was Rev. Best Okike. Methodist College is located on approximately 93 acres (38 ha) of land in Umuachama Amamba village, Uzuakoli district in Abia State.

The college operated the Uzuakoli Leprosy Research Center, which was run and overseen by some of the same missionaries who served at the college. Rev. T.F. Davey from Great Britain led the foundation for the research center.

Prince Daniel Chiekweiro Onyema, The First Chief Engineer for Eastern Region of Nigeria.

== Mission ==
The school's motto is "You First, I Second". The college anthem was selected from the Methodist Hymn Book No.64 "Praise to the Lord, the Almighty the King of Creations". By 1953, Methodist College had expanded into three academic centers comprising the secondary, high school and teacher training Centers. The teacher training arm of the school was later relocated outside the main college campus, while the high school program was terminated in 1973. The "Castle", a square-shaped block of living quarters, was constructed in 1930 to board 150 students at a time.

While there were roughly 400-day students attending the college in 2013, in the late 1970s there were about 1,500 boarding students in the college. During this period, students were accommodated in twelve houses grouped by their locations on campus as follows:

Crescent Group

- Achinivu
- Nwanna
- Okpara

Castle Group

- Aggrey
- Williams
- Hardy
- Carver

Obiohia Group

- Spray
- Ibiam
- Niger

New Territory

- Ukpabi
- Imo

At its prime, students of the college had opportunities to participate in the Arts and Debating Society, Science Club, Scripture Union, Society for the Promotion of Igbo Language and Culture, Horticultural Society, Theater and Dramatic Society, etc. Some of the accolades bestowed upon the college included winner of the 1980 National Quiz Championship and 1978 Imo State Debating Championship.

Methodist College consistently graduated its students with complete Higher School Certificate (HSC) papers and credits in the West African School Certificate (WASC), which was equivalent to the British General Certificate of Education (GCE).

== Notable alumni ==
- Emeka Ezeugo, Super Eagles
- Chinedu Ikedieze (alias Aki of the Aki Na Pawpaw fame)
- Clement Isong, former governor of Central Bank of Nigeria and governor of Cross River State (1979–1983)
- Eddie Mbadiwe, member of the Nigerian House of Representatives
- Edward Ikem Okeke, former deputy president of the PRP Party, and presidential special adviser, Nigeria's Second Republic
- Michael Okpara, former premier of Eastern Region, Nigeria
- Sir Justice Egbert Udo Udoma, former judge of the Supreme Court of Nigeria, Chief Justice of Uganda, and chairman of Nigeria's 1978 Constituent Assembly)
- Chief Onyema Ugochukwu, former director of Daily Times of Nigeria and former chairman of Niger Delta Development Corporation
- Ambassador Jonah Chinyere Achara, First Agent General of Eastern Nigeria to the United Kingdom and Northern Ireland.
- O. C. Onwudike, Nigerian professor and administrator
