= Aba Power Limited Electric =

Aba Power Limited Electric (APLE) is a Nigerian electricity distribution company licensed by the Nigerian Electricity Regulatory Commission (NERC) to supply electricity to nine local government areas within Abia State. APLE's service area, known as the “Aba ring-fence,” covers nine of the 17 local government areas in Abia State: Aba South, Aba North, Osisioma, Obingwa, Ugwunagbo, Ukwa East, Ukwa West, Isiala Ngwa South, and Isiala Ngwa North.

== History ==
APLE was established as part of the Aba Integrated Power Project to deliver vertically integrated electricity generation, transmission, and distribution in southeastern Nigeria.

In April 2023, the Transmission Company of Nigeria's Market Operator suspended APLE's supply feeders for non-compliance with market rules which included failure to provide required bank guarantees and settle invoices dating from September 2022 to February 2023. Major feeders were disconnected until APLE paid the defaults; the suspension was lifted following intervention by the Minister of Power and fulfillment of Market Operator requirements.

The company started generating electricity directly from the adjacent 188 MW plant in March 2024.
