= Federal College of Education, Eha-Amufu =

Nigerian higher education institution

- Type: Public
- Established: February 21, 1981; 45 years ago
- Affiliations: University of Nigeria
- Provost: Pauline Ikwuegbu
- Location: Eha Amufu, Enugu State, Nigeria
- Website: Official website

The Federal College of Education, Eha-Amufu, is a federal government higher education institution located in Eha Amufu, Enugu State, Nigeria. It is affiliated to the University of Nigeria for its degree programmes. The current provost is Pauline Ikwuegbu.

== History ==
The Federal College of Education, Eha-Amufu, was established in 1981.

The college was established on February 21, 1981, by the then governor of the old Anambra state, Chief. Jim Ifeanyichukwu Nwobodo. On December 23, 1982, the then Anambra State House of Assembly enacted a law retroactively establishing the college. The law was cited as Anambra State of Nigeria Law No. 28 of 1982 which came into force on February 21, 1981. The site was formerly occupied by the Federal Government-owned Teacher Training College (TTC), Eha-Amufu.

After the announcement of the establishment of the College of Education Eha-Amufu by the governor with effect from February 21, 1981, a temporary office with skeletal staff was opened around the then Anambra Television (ATV), Independence Layout, Enugu. On August 7, 1981, the then Anambra state commissioner for education and the then permanent secretary to the Ministry took the newly appointed provost and registrar to the present site of the college at Eha-Amufu about 64 km north-east of the coal city, the Enugu State capital. The initial enrolment of 196 students were admitted in 1981 and staff strength of 147 made up of 23 academic staff, 15 senior administrative staff and 109 junior staff. The maiden graduation ceremony was held in 1984.The staff strength as at 1981–1994 was 89 academic staff, 8 administrative, 58 technical staff, 231 junior staff, totaling 378. Between 1991 and 1994, the total staff strength had reached 588 which was the result of expansion in all aspects of the college including infrastructure.

Following the creation of state in 1991, the then Enugu State Government inherited the college from the former Anambra State Government. The college functioned as a state institution until the Federal Government took over it in April 1993 with financial effect from January 1994. Decree No. 4 of 1986 as amended by Decree No. 34 of 1993 and Decree No. 6 of 1993 established the Federal College of Education, Eha-Amufu, among the other 19 colleges. These laws provided therefore all the structures established under the 1982 Anambra State Legislation.

The Federal College of Education, Eha-Amufu, is the 20th Federal College of Education in the Federal Colleges of Education system in Nigeria.

== Courses ==
The institution offers the following courses:

- Economics
- French
- Igbo
- Hausa
- Music
- Integrated Science
- Political Science
- History
- Social Studies
- English
- Yoruba
- Christian Religious Studies
- Computer Education
- Physical and Health Education
- Fine and Applied Arts
- Mathematics
- Business Education
- Agricultural Science Education
- Primary Education Studies
- Home Economics

== Affiliation ==
The institution is affiliated with the University of Nigeria to offer programmes leading to Bachelor of Education, (B.Ed.) in:

- English Language Education
- Mathematics Education
- Chemistry Education
- Economics Education
- History Education
- Social Studies Education
- Christian Religion Education
- Integrated Education
- Physics Education
- Agric Education
- Biology Education
- Business Education
