= Eha Amufu =

- Town
- Location in Nigeria
- Coordinates: 6°39′N 7°46′E
- Country: Nigeria
- State: Enugu State

Area
  - Town: 877 km^{2} (339 sq mi)

Population (2016)
  - Town: 70,779
  - Rural: 148,415
- Time zone: UTC+1 (WAT)

Eha Amufu// (Igbo: Eha-Umuhu) is a town in Enugu State, Nigeria. It is located in the Isi Uzo Local Government Area, and borders Ebonyi State and Benue State. It is regarded as the largest and most populated community in the Isi Uzo Local Government Area. The town has a history of being a central conduit of Igbo Nationalism in the region, due to its historical involvement in the Nigerian Civil War from 1967 to 1970.

== History ==
=== Early history ===
Before the Nigerian Civil War, the town was small and primarily agrarian. The initial date of founding is unclear, but records stretch back to the 18th century. The Igbo people are the primary inhabitants of the town. According to Nnaji Nwa Nnaji, a late elder of the town, Eha Amufu started out as the town "Eha" which has had a long history, primarily based upon the establishment of new towns and villages with "Eha" in their names. With new settlements founded, Eha changed its name to "Eha-Umuhu", remaining the oldest of the Eha towns.

In the early 19th century, the town engaged in a community war with its neighboring community, Nkalaha. The conflict, which spanned from 1829 to 1831, was over the boundary maintenance at the nearby Ochini River. Nkahala emerged as the decisive victor. In the ensuing peace agreement, Eka Amufu presented Nkalaha with a horse. Both parties also entered into a blood covenant, vowing never to harm each other again.

=== Nigerian Civil War ===
Eha Amufu played a secondary role in the Nigerian Civil War. Located to the northeast of the city of Enugu, the capital of Biafra, the town had a strategic position in the war due to the rail transport the city offered. Two primary trains functionally ran through the town, the Express Train (later known as the Diesel Train) and the local goods train known as the Subaba Train. These trains allowed for the town to become an exchange center.

During the 1966 anti-Igbo Pogrom the town received a number of decapitated bodies and refugees during the administration of the Red Cross and the Eastern Region of Nigeria. At the end of the war in 1970, Nigerian troops were stationed in the town for years before relocating to Obollo-Afor.

=== Post-War ===
After the war, Eha Amufu become home to the Federal College of Education, an affiliate of the University of Nigeria. The town also has an official post office. In 2022, a number of Fulani herdsmen aided by Igala peoples committed a massacre with over 50 casualties in the town and neighboring regions, causing major displacement, unrest, and military intervention.

== Demographics ==
Eha-Amufu is composed of ten villages:

- Abor
- Agu-Amede
- Amede
- Ape-Mgbuji
- Ihenyi
- Isu
- Mgbuji
- Orokoro
- Umuhu
- Umujoovu

== See also ==
- Populated places in Enugu State
