= Uzuakoli =

Place in Abia State, Nigeria

Uzuakoli is an area in Abia State of Eastern Nigeria that includes several villages. It has been home to a Methodist College, a large market, clandestine slave trading, a leprosy settlement, and the Ila Oso Festival. Uzuakoli is located within the Igbo "heartland".

The University of California has a photograph of Methodist missionaries in Uzuakoli in 1924.

In 1964, students of Methodist College of Uzuakoli wrote a short history of the area.

Other photos of area residents are in archives.

== Notable people ==
- Chinedu Ikedieze (born 1977) — Nigerian actor, entrepreneur and investor
- Mike Ezuruonye (born 1982) — Nigerian actor
- Bernard Batty — early Methodist minister whose sons attended Elmfield College in York

== See also ==
- Operation Leopard (1969)
