= National Museum of Colonial History, Aba =

The National Museum of Colonial History is a heritage museum located at No. 6 Ikot Ekpene Road in Aba, Abia State, Nigeria. Established on March 8, 1985, the museum is dedicated to preserving and showcasing artefacts and exhibits related to Nigeria's colonial past, particularly focusing on the experiences of Southeastern Nigeria under British rule. It is managed by the National Commission for Museums and Monuments (NCMM) and serves as a centre for historical education and cultural preservation.

The museum is housed in a historic wooden consulate building dating back to the late 19th century, which itself is a relic of colonial architecture. Its collections encompass a range of artefacts, including documents, photographs, and relics from the colonial era, providing insights into Nigeria's journey from pre-colonial times through colonisation to independence.

== History ==
The National Museum of Colonial History, Aba, was officially established on March 8, 1985, and commissioned by Brigadier Ike Nwachukwu, then Military Governor of old Imo State, under whose jurisdiction Aba fell before the creation of Abia State. The museum occupies the Old Consulate Building of the defunct Eastern Central State, located at 6 Ikot Ekpene Road, Aba. The building housing the museum which is a wooden structure was originally used as a trade station during the colonial period. Its preservation and adaptation into a museum serve as a testament to Nigeria's commitment to preserving its colonial history.

Before its conversion, the building was in a state of disrepair and not suitable for formal government use. However, efforts led by Mr. Ebenezer Onyoma, who was drafted to head the location, initiated the transformation of the abandoned colonial building into a public museum. Renovation work began in the early 1980s, accompanied by the construction of additional structures to support the new museum complex. A team of ethnographers and historians was assembled to source and document material culture relevant to Nigeria's colonial experience. These items, alongside interpretive write-ups, formed the initial basis of the museum's collection.

In his pre-commissioning address on March 7, 1985, Dr. Ekpo Eyo, then Director-General of the National Commission for Museums and Monuments and a pioneer advocate for the museum, described it as the first colonial history museum in Nigeria and Africa. He outlined its key objectives as follows:

- To depict the diverse tongues and traditions that were amalgamated into a single nation through colonialism by European traders, missionaries, and explorers;
- To chronicle Nigeria's historical journey from early European contact through the colonial period to independence;
- To serve as a visual and experiential complement to textual history for students and the general public;
- To provide visitors with recreational services, including a museum kitchen offering traditional Nigerian foods and palm wine.

Over the years, the museum has expanded its collections to include over 400 historical items, encompassing ethnographic objects, archaeological artifacts, and colonial-era documents. These collections form the core of its exhibitions, especially its distinctive photo-and-caption style historical timeline, providing valuable resources for researchers, students, and visitors interested in Nigeria's colonial past and its impact on the nation's development.

== Location and structure ==
The National Museum of Colonial History is located at No. 6 Ikot Ekpene Road, in the heart of Aba, Abia State, southeastern Nigeria. The museum stands near the busy Aba Main Park and is easily accessible via major roads linking the city to other parts of Abia and neighboring states.

The museum is housed in a colonial-era wooden building, originally constructed in the 1890s. This structure was once used as a British administrative office and is one of the few remaining examples of pre-independence colonial architecture in the region. The building's preservation and conversion into a museum reflect a broader effort to conserve Nigeria's material heritage and architectural history.

The structure itself is considered a historic artifact. It features wood-paneled walls, colonial-style windows, and a pitched roof, architectural elements that mirror the design trends of British-built institutions in Nigeria during the late 19th and early 20th centuries. Though modest in size compared to larger national museums, the building offers an intimate environment suitable for reflection and historical education.

== Exhibits and collections ==
The National Museum of Colonial History, one of the fifty-three Museums located across Nigeria, houses a diverse collection of 415 historical collections, 310 ethnographic objects, and 151 archeological objects. These are primarily focused on Nigeria's colonial and immediate postcolonial periods. The exhibits are arranged chronologically and thematically, guiding visitors through key phases in Nigerian history, from the pre-colonial era to British occupation, nationalist struggles, and the attainment of independence in 1960.

Some of the museum's notable exhibits include:

- Colonial-era photographs and documents, including British administrative records, taxation documents, and correspondences.
- Ethnographic objects used during the colonial period, such as local tools, traditional garments, and household items.
- Relics of nationalist movements, including posters, handbills, and pamphlets from independence campaigns.
- Maps and cartographic records showing the delineation of Nigeria during various stages of colonial administration.
- Personal items and memorabilia from influential colonial officers and Nigerian leaders involved in resistance efforts.
- The museum also houses the table on which the Amalgamation of Northern and Southern Nigeria was signed by Lord Lugard.

The museum also curates rotating exhibits that highlight themes such as colonial education policies, missionary activities, and the economic transformation of southeastern Nigeria under British rule. These artifacts collectively offer insight into how colonialism shaped modern Nigeria, making the museum an important resource for students, historians, and cultural enthusiasts alike.

== Educational and cultural role ==
The National Museum of Colonial History, Aba serves as a very important institution for historical education and cultural preservation in Nigeria. Established to complement written texts on colonial history, the museum offers visual and experiential learning opportunities that enhance the understanding of Nigeria's colonial past.

=== Educational initiatives ===
The museum actively collaborates with educational institutions to provide resources and programs that support the study of Nigeria's colonial era. It hosts school excursions, academic research, and educational tours that facilitate interactive learning experiences for students and scholars.

=== Cultural engagement ===
Beyond its educational mandate, the museum engages in cultural activities aimed at preserving and promoting Nigerian heritage. Notably, it organized a "Museum Conversation" event themed "Exploring the Intangible Heritage and Sacred Landscapes in Eastern Nigeria", which included research and training in creative and virtual arts for youths aged 15–25.

=== Community outreach ===
The museum also serves as a community hub, offering facilities such as a museum kitchen that provides traditional meals and refreshments. This initiative not only enhances the visitor experience but also supports the preservation of Nigerian culinary traditions.

== Challenges and preservation efforts ==
The National Museum of Colonial History in Aba faces several challenges that impact its preservation and functionality. These issues are emblematic of broader systemic problems affecting museums across Nigeria.

=== Funding and infrastructure deficits ===
A significant challenge confronting the museum is inadequate funding, which hampers routine maintenance, artifact conservation, and infrastructural upgrades. Reports indicate that many Nigerian museums, including the National Museum of Colonial History, operate with limited financial resources, leading to deteriorating facilities and compromised preservation of exhibits.

=== Public awareness and engagement ===
Despite its historical significance, the museum struggles with low public awareness and patronage. Many residents of Aba are unaware of the museum's existence or its offerings. This lack of engagement undermines the museum's role in cultural education and heritage preservation. Efforts to increase visibility, such as community outreach programs and collaborations with educational institutions, are essential to enhance public interest.

=== Preservation of cultural heritage ===
The museum's mission to preserve Nigeria's colonial history is challenged by the broader issue of cultural heritage preservation in the country. Factors such as modernisation, neglect, and insufficient preservation policies contribute to the degradation of historical artifacts and sites. Strengthening preservation efforts requires comprehensive strategies, including policy reforms, capacity building, and increased investment in conservation technologies.

=== Collaborative initiatives ===
To address these challenges, the museum has engaged in collaborative initiatives aimed at revitalization and capacity building. For instance, partnerships with international organizations, such as the Goethe-Institut, have facilitated programs that promote cultural heritage awareness and support the museum's activities. These collaborations are crucial for resource mobilization and enhancing the museum's operational capabilities.

== Visitor information ==
=== Location ===
The National Museum of Colonial History is located at 6 Ikot Ekpene Road, Aba, Abia State, Nigeria. The museum is situated within the historic Old Consulate Building of the former Eastern Central State, offering a central and accessible location within the city of Aba.

=== Opening hours and accessibility ===
The museum is typically open to the public from Monday to Friday, between 9:00 AM and 4:00 PM, although hours may vary on public holidays. It is managed by the National Commission for Museums and Monuments (NCMM), which supervises all federal museums across Nigeria.

The facility is accessible by road and located near major commercial and residential areas in Aba. However, some reports note that signage and road access can be improved to make the site more visible and welcoming to tourists and researchers.

=== Admission and services ===
Admission into the museum is usually free or subject to a minimal fee, depending on current NCMM policies. A visitor, Favour, who visited the museum claimed to have paid 200 naira as gate fee in 2022. The museum caters to a wide audience, including school excursions, researchers, local visitors, and tourists. Guided tours are often provided by museum staff to help visitors better understand the colonial-era exhibits and Nigeria's historical trajectory.

In addition to its gallery spaces, the museum offers limited visitor amenities such as a museum kitchen, which serves traditional Nigerian delicacies including local foods and palm wine. This feature was originally envisioned by the museum's founding director, Dr. Ekpo Eyo, as a way to enhance visitor experience and provide cultural immersion.

=== Research and educational access ===
The museum is also an important resource for students, academics, and researchers, especially those interested in Nigeria's colonial history. It houses hundreds of curated ethnographic, photographic, and archaeological collections that are accessible for academic study. Visitors are advised to schedule appointments in advance for research purposes.

=== Tourism and nearby facilities ===
The museum is located within reach of hotels, restaurants, and markets in central Aba, including the popular Ekeoha Shopping Centre. Its proximity to these attractions positions it as a potential hub for cultural tourism. However, tourism development in the area remains underexploited due to underfunding and limited promotional efforts.
