= Ariaria International Market =

Open-air market in Aba, Nigeria

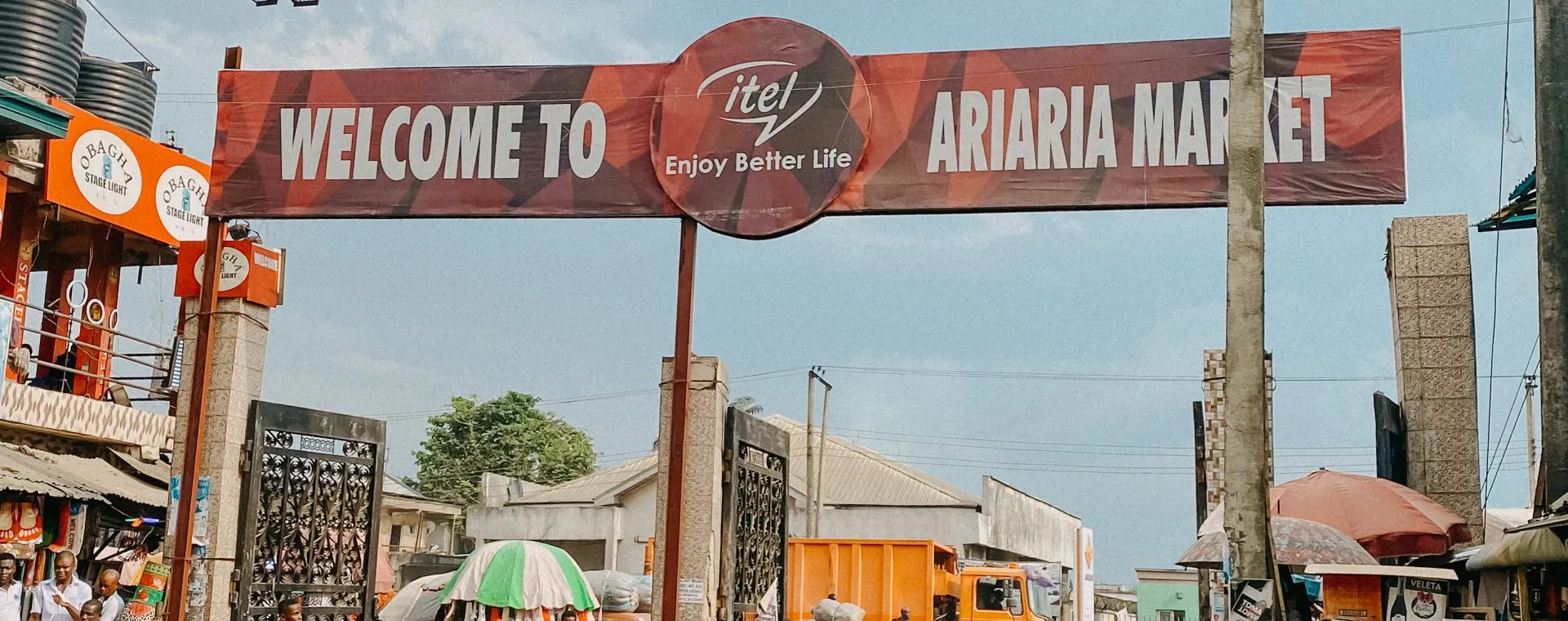
- Ariaria
- Location: Aba, Abia State, Nigeria; 5°6′55.2″N 7°20′8.3″E
- Opening date: 1976
- Management: Abia State Government
- Days normally open: Monday - Saturday
- Interactive map of Ariaria International Market

The Ariaria International Market is an open-air market located in Aba, a city in Abia State in Southeast Nigeria. The market is one of the largest markets in West Africa and nicknamed "China of Africa" because of its versatility in the making of wears and leather works.

== Historical and structural background ==
Ariaria International Market was established in 1976 following a fire outbreak that destroyed the old Ekeoha Market in Aba. The market was originally sited in a swampy area. The market is known for its shoemaking and leather works thus making it one of the largest leather shoe-making markets in West Africa with an estimated two million traders. With more than 37,000 stalls, fabrics, household goods and pharmaceutical items are also available in the market. For more than two decades, the market has serviced clients home and abroad. Manufacturers in the market boast that their clientele base extends beyond the shores of Africa. “Many citizens in Europe and Africa have the market to thank for many of the leather shoes they wear,” Amobi Nwanagu, President, StandUp Africa, claims. The market cuts across three local government areas, the Aba North, Aba South, and Osisioma.

== Challenges ==
Incessant flooding and fire outbreaks due to poor planning have been identified as recurring challenges of the market. The 2022 floods in the market brought on by the remodeling of the A-line section led to a protest by traders who claimed that they lost goods worth billions of Naira to the floods. This action was condemned and termed ‘political’ by the Abia State government.

In 2024, the Abia State government approved the reconstruction of the Ariaria road which connects the market to the Aba - Port Harcourt expressway to ease the challenge of overcrowding and poor road network to the market.
