= 2023 Abia State elections =

2023 elections in Abia State, Nigeria

- 25 February, 11 March, and 28 April 2023
- Registered: 2,120,808

The Abia State elections in 2023 were held on 25 February, 11 March, and 28 April 2023. As part of the nationwide election, the state voted for President and Vice President on 25 February. Additionally, elections for the Senate and the House of Representatives were held on the same day. On 11 March, the election for Governor of Abia State took place alongside elections to the state House of Assembly. Local government elections were scheduled for 28 April.

== Federal elections ==
=== Presidential election ===
Abia State voted for the President of Nigeria alongside the Senate and House of Representatives elections on 25 February 2023.

=== National Assembly elections ===
==== Senate elections ====
All 3 Abia State seats in the Senate of Nigeria were up for election alongside the presidential and House of Representatives elections on 25 February 2023.

District	Incumbent		Results	
District	Incumbent	Party	Status	Candidates
Abia Central	Theodore Orji	PDP	Incumbent retired New member elected LP gain	▌ ✓ Darlington Nwokocha (LP); ▌Sam Onuigbo (APC); ▌Ahamdi Emmanuel Nweke (APGA); ▌Augustine Akobundu (PDP)
Abia North	Orji Uzor Kalu	APC	Incumbent re-elected	▌ ✓ Orji Uzor Kalu (APC); ▌Carol Dike-Okorafor (APGA); ▌Mao Ohuabunwa (PDP)
Abia South	Enyinnaya Abaribe	APGA (Note: This senator was elected as a member of the PDP but switched to APGA during their term.)	Incumbent re-elected	▌ ✓ Enyinnaya Abaribe (APGA); ▌Blessing Nwagba (APC); ▌Okezie Ikpeazu (PDP)

==== House of Representatives elections ====
All 8 Abia State seats in the House of Representatives of Nigeria were up for election alongside the presidential and Senate elections on 25 February 2023.

Constituency	Incumbent		Results	
Constituency	Incumbent	Party	Status	Candidates
Aba North/Aba South	Chimaobi Ebisike	PDP	Incumbent renominated New member elected LP gain	▌ ✓ Emeka Nnamani (LP); ▌Alex Mascot Ikwechegh (APGA); ▌Chimaobi Ebisike (PDP)
Arochukwu/Ohafia	Uko Nkole	PDP	Incumbent retired New member elected LP gain	▌ ✓ Ibe Okwara-Osonwa (LP); ▌Daniel Chimezie Okeke (APC); ▌Okuji Oreh (APGA); ▌Ifeanyi Uchendu (PDP)
Bende federal constituency	Benjamin Kalu	APC	Incumbent re-elected	▌ ✓ Benjamin Kalu (APC); ▌Chibuisi Lazarus Mbakwe (APGA); ▌Nnenna Elendu Ukeje (PDP)
Isiala Ngwa North/Isiala Ngwa South	Darlington Nwokocha	LP (Note: This House member was elected as a member of the PDP but switched to the LP during their term.)	Incumbent retired New member elected LP hold	▌ ✓ Ginger Obinna Onwusibe (LP); ▌Chijioke Ikpo (APC); ▌Magnus Emeka Akpuluo (APGA); ▌Anthony Chidi Agbazuere (PDP)
Isuikwuato/Umunneochi	Nkeiruka Onyejeocha	APC	Incumbent lost re-election New member elected LP gain	▌ ✓ Amobi Ogah (LP); ▌Nkeiruka Onyejeocha (APC); ▌Onyinye Kay Rufus-Obi (APGA); ▌Loveth Nonye Ofoegbu (PDP)
Obingwa/Ugwunagbo/Osisioma	Solomon Adaelu	APGA (Note: This House member was elected as a member of the PDP but switched to APGA during their term.)	Incumbent withdrew from primary (Note: House member defected to new party after withdrawing from or losing their former party's primary.); Incumbent lost re-election under nomination of new party New member elected LP gain	▌ ✓ Munachim Alozie (LP); ▌Timothy Charles Chidiebere (APC); ▌Solomon Adaelu (APGA); ▌Chinwendu Nwanganga (PDP)
Ukwa East/Ukwa West	Uzoma Nkem-Abonta	PDP	Incumbent retired New member elected PDP hold	▌ ✓ Christian Nkwonta (PDP); ▌Adinigwe Nwoke (APGA)
Umuahia North/Umuahia South/Ikwuano	Samuel Onuigbo	APC (Note: This House member was elected as a member of the PDP but switched to the APC during their term.)	Incumbent retired New member elected LP gain	▌ ✓ Obinna Aguocha (LP); ▌Obilo Ogbonna (APC); ▌Ogbonna Abarikwu (APGA); ▌Chinedum Enyinnaya Orji (PDP)

== State elections ==
=== Gubernatorial election ===
2023 Abia State gubernatorial election
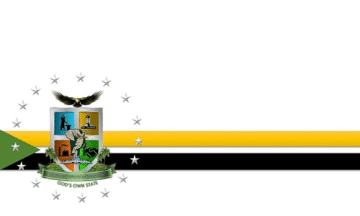
- 18 March 2023
- Opinion polls
- Registered: 2,120,808
Nominee	Alex Otti	Okey Ahiwe	Enyinnaya Nwafor
Party	LP	PDP	YPP
Running mate	Ikechukwu Emetu	Jasper Uche	Chima Anyaso
Nominee	Ikechi Emenike	Gregory Ibe
Party	APC	APGA
Running mate	Gloria Akara	Obinna Ichita
Governor before election
Okezie Ikpeazu
PDP
Elected Governor
Alex Otti
LP

Incumbent PDP Governor Okezie Ikpeazu was re-elected to a second term in 2019 with 60.26% of the vote. He was term-limited in 2023 and could not seek re-election for a third term.

=== House of Assembly elections ===
All 24 seats in the Abia State House of Assembly were up for election alongside the gubernatorial elections on 11 March 2023.

Affiliation	Party					Total
Affiliation	PDP	APC	APGA	LP	Vacant	Total
Previous Election	19	2	1 (Note: The 2019 elections in the APGA-held constituencies of Arochukwu and Aba South were partially voided and supplementary elections called. Although APGA retained the seats in the supplementary elections, the elections were held in early 2020 so the party's 2019 total is 1 seat.)	0	2 (Note: The 2019 elections in the constituencies of Arochukwu and Aba South were partially voided and supplementary elections called. As the supplementary elections were held in early 2020, the post-2019 elections vacancy total is 2 seats.)	24
Before Election	18	3	1	2	0	24
After Election	TBD	TBD	TBD	TBD	TBD	24

== Local elections ==
The Abia State Independent Electoral Commission announced local elections for 28 April.
