= 2023 Nigerian House of Representatives elections in Abia State =

2023 House of Representatives elections in Abia

- 25 February 2023

All 8 Abia State seats in the House of Representatives of Nigeria
	Majority party	Minority party
Party	PDP	APC
Last election	5	2
Seats before	3	3
	Third party	Fourth party
Party	APGA	LP
Last election	1	0
Seats before	1	1

The 2023 Nigerian House of Representatives elections in Abia State was held on 25 February 2023, to elect the 3 House of Representatives members from Abia State, one from each of the state's three senatorial districts. The elections will coincide with the 2023 presidential election, as well as other elections to the House of Representatives and elections to the Senate; with state elections being held two weeks later. Primaries were held between 4 April and 9 June 2022.

== Overview ==
Affiliation	Party				Total
Affiliation	PDP	APC	APGA	LP	Total
Previous Election	5	2	1	0	8
Before Election	3	3	1	1	8
After Election	1	1	0	6	8

== Summary ==
Constituency	Incumbent		Results	
Constituency	Incumbent	Party	Status	Candidates
Aba North/Aba South	Chimaobi Ebisike	PDP	Incumbent renominated New member elected LP gain	▌ ✓ Emeka Nnamani (LP); ▌Alex Mascot Ikwechegh (APGA); ▌Chimaobi Ebisike (PDP)
Arochukwu/Ohafia	Uko Nkole	PDP	Incumbent retired New member elected LP gain	▌ ✓ Ibe Okwara-Osonwa (LP); ▌Daniel Chimezie Okeke (APC); ▌Okuji Oreh (APGA); ▌Ifeanyi Uchendu (PDP)
Bende federal constituency	Benjamin Kalu	APC	Incumbent re-elected	▌ ✓ Benjamin Kalu (APC); ▌Chibuisi Lazarus Mbakwe (APGA); ▌Nnenna Elendu Ukeje (PDP)
Isiala Ngwa North/Isiala Ngwa South	Darlington Nwokocha	LP (Note: This House member was elected as a member of the PDP but switched to the LP during their term.)	Incumbent retired New member elected LP hold	▌ ✓ Ginger Obinna Onwusibe (LP); ▌Chijioke Ikpo (APC); ▌Magnus Emeka Akpuluo (APGA); ▌Anthony Chidi Agbazuere (PDP)
Isuikwuato/Umunneochi	Nkeiruka Onyejeocha	APC	Incumbent lost re-election New member elected LP gain	▌ ✓ Amobi Ogah (LP); ▌Nkeiruka Onyejeocha (APC); ▌Onyinye Kay Rufus-Obi (APGA); ▌Loveth Nonye Ofoegbu (PDP)
Obingwa/Ugwunagbo/Osisioma	Solomon Adaelu	APGA (Note: This House member was elected as a member of the PDP but switched to APGA during their term.)	Incumbent withdrew from primary (Note: House member defected to new party after withdrawing from or losing their former party's primary.); Incumbent lost re-election under nomination of new party New member elected LP gain	▌ ✓ Munachim Alozie (LP); ▌Timothy Charles Chidiebere (APC); ▌Solomon Adaelu (APGA); ▌Chinwendu Nwanganga (PDP)
Ukwa East/Ukwa West	Uzoma Nkem-Abonta	PDP	Incumbent retired New member elected PDP hold	▌ ✓ Christian Nkwonta (PDP); ▌Adinigwe Nwoke (APGA)
Umuahia North/Umuahia South/Ikwuano	Samuel Onuigbo	APC (Note: This House member was elected as a member of the PDP but switched to the APC during their term.)	Incumbent retired New member elected LP gain	▌ ✓ Obinna Aguocha (LP); ▌Obilo Ogbonna (APC); ▌Ogbonna Abarikwu (APGA); ▌Chinedum Enyinnaya Orji (PDP)

== Aba North/Aba South ==
2023 Aba North/Aba South Federal Constituency election
- 25 February 2023
Nominee	Alex Mascot Ikwechegh	Chimaobi Ebisike	Emeka Nnamani
Party	APGA	PDP	LP
Representative before election
Chimaobi Ebisike
PDP
Elected Representative
Emeka Nnamani
LP

The Aba North/Aba South Federal Constituency covers the local government areas of Aba North and Aba South. In 2019, Ossy Prestige (APGA) was elected to the seat with 54.4% of the vote but he died in February 2021. In the ensuing March 2021 by-election, Chimaobi Ebisike (PDP) was elected with 65.5% of the vote; he is seeking re-election.

=== General election ===
==== Results ====
2023 Aba North/Aba South Federal Constituency election
Party	Candidate	Votes	%
APP	Christopher Igboko Okoroafor		
ADC	Chiamaka Peters		
APGA	Alex Mascot Ikwechegh		
LP	Emeka Nnamani		
NRM	Ude Ndukwe Egwu		
New Nigeria Peoples Party	Jonah Mbah		
PDP	Chimaobi Ebisike		
SDP	Emeka Joseph Nwosu		
YPP	Maduabughichi Ahukanna		
Total votes			100.00%
Invalid or blank votes			N/A
Turnout			

== Arochukwu/Ohafia ==
2023 Arochukwu/Ohafia Federal Constituency election
- 25 February 2023
Nominee	Daniel Chimezie Okeke	Okuji Oreh	Ifeanyi Uchendu
Party	APC	APGA	PDP
Nominee	Okwara Osonwa Ibe
Party	LP
Representative before election
Uko Nkole
PDP
Elected Representative
Okwara Osonwa Ibe
LP

The Arochukwu/Ohafia Federal Constituency covers the local government areas of Arochukwu and Ohafia. Incumbent Uko Nkole (PDP) was elected with 34.7% of the vote in 2019. Nkole opted not to seek re-election instead running for the Abia North senate seat; he came second in the PDP primary.

=== General election ===
==== Results ====
2023 Arochukwu/Ohafia Federal Constituency election
Party	Candidate	Votes	%
AA	Ndukwe Obuba Ndukwe		
APP	Prince Arua Arunsi		
ADC	Okereke Rosemerit Sunday		
APC	Chimezie Okeke		
APGA	Okuji Oreh		
APM	Dorothy Chinnaya Onwumere		
LP	Okwara Osonwa Ibe		
NRM	Boris John Olugu		
New Nigeria Peoples Party	Fred Eke Idika		
PDP	Ifeanyi Uchendu		
SDP	Chigozie Omereonye		
YPP	Stephen Ukpai Ukwa		
Total votes			100.00%
Invalid or blank votes			N/A
Turnout			

== Bende ==
2023 Bende Federal Constituency election
- 25 February 2023
Nominee	Benjamin Kalu	Chibuisi Lazarus Mbakwe	Nnenna Elendu Ukeje
Party	APC	APGA	PDP
Representative before election
Benjamin Kalu
APC
Elected Representative
Benjamin Kalu
All Progressive Congress (Nigeria)

The Bende Federal Constituency covers the local government area of Bende. Incumbent Benjamin Kalu (APC), who was elected with 51.8% of the vote in 2019, is seeking re-election.

=== General election ===
==== Results ====
2023 Bende Federal Constituency election
Party	Candidate	Votes	%
APP	Samuel Okorie Kwubiri		
ADC	Kelechi Kalu		
APC	Benjamin Kalu		
APGA	Chibuisi Lazarus Mbakwe		
APM	N. Obioma Nelson James		
LP	Iheanyi Frank Chinasa		
New Nigeria Peoples Party	Amaghuwa Anosike		
PDP	Nnenna Elendu Ukeje		
SDP	Ndubuisi Nwosu		
YPP	Chukwuemeka Mba Ogbonnaya		
Total votes			100.00%
Invalid or blank votes			N/A
Turnout			

== Isiala Ngwa North/Isiala Ngwa South ==
2023 Isiala Ngwa North/Isiala Ngwa South Federal Constituency election
- 25 February 2023
Nominee	Chijioke Ikpo	Magnus Emeka Akpuluo	Anthony Chidi Agbazuere
Party	APC	APGA	PDP
Nominee	Ginger Obinna Onwusibe
Party	LP
Representative before election
Darlington Nwokocha
LP
Elected Representative
Ginger Obinna Onwusibe
LP

The Isiala Ngwa North/Isiala Ngwa South Federal Constituency covers the local government areas of Isiala Ngwa North and Isiala Ngwa South. Incumbent Darlington Nwokocha (LP) was elected with 60.0% of the vote in 2019 as a member of the PDP. Nwokocha opted against running for re-election and decided to run for the Abia Central senate seat, defecting to the LP in June 2022 to become its senatorial nominee.

=== General election ===
==== Results ====
2023 Isiala Ngwa North/Isiala Ngwa South Federal Constituency election
Party	Candidate	Votes	%
APP	Vincent Azu Alilionwu		
ADC	Michael Chinyere		
APC	Chijioke Ikpo		
APGA	Magnus Emeka Akpuluo		
APM	Uchenna Davidson Uzoechi		
LP	Ginger Obinna Onwusibe		
NRM	Uche Buz Erondu		
New Nigeria Peoples Party	Kelechi Madugba		
PRP	Onyecherelam Obioma Ogwuma		
PDP	Anthony Chidi Agbazuere		
SDP	Chukwudi Nkwachukwere Stanley Nwaokike		
YPP	Michael Lucky Nwogu		
Total votes			100.00%
Invalid or blank votes			N/A
Turnout			

== Isuikwuato/Umunneochi ==
2023 Isuikwuato/Umunneochi Federal Constituency election
- 25 February 2023
Nominee	Nkeiruka Onyejeocha	Onyinye Kay Rufus-Obi	Loveth Nonye Ofoegbu
Party	APC	APGA	PDP
Nominee	Amobi Ogah
Party	LP
Representative before election
Nkeiruka Onyejeocha
APC
Elected Representative
Amobi Ogah
LP

The Isuikwuato/Umunneochi Federal Constituency covers the local government areas of Isuikwuato and Umu-Nneochi. Incumbent Nkeiruka Onyejeocha (APC), who was elected with 52.2% of the vote in 2019, is seeking re-election.

=== General election ===
==== Results ====
2023 Isuikwuato/Umunneochi Federal Constituency election
Party	Candidate	Votes	%
APP	Lilian Chinasa Obenwa		
ADC	Favour Nzeacnoche		
APC	Nkeiruka Onyejeocha		
APGA	Onyinye Kay Rufus-Obi		
LP	Amobi Ogah		
New Nigeria Peoples Party	Ugochukwu Brown Ugba		
PDP	Loveth Nonye Ofoegbu		
SDP	Ikechukwu Ikemefula Ochuba		
YPP	Charles Ugochukwu Onu		
Total votes			100.00%
Invalid or blank votes			N/A
Turnout			

== Obingwa/Ugwunagbo/Osisioma ==
2023 Obingwa/Ugwunagbo/Osisioma Federal Constituency election
- 25 February 2023
Nominee	Timothy Charles Chidiebere	Solomon Adaelu
Party	APC	APGA
Nominee	Munachim Alozie	Chinwendu Nwanganga
Party	LP	PDP
Representative before election
Solomon Adaelu
APGA
Elected Representative
Munachim Alozie
LP

The Obingwa/Ugwunagbo/Osisioma Federal Constituency covers the local government areas of Obingwa, Osisioma Ngwa, and Ugwunagbo. Incumbent Solomon Adaelu (APGA) was elected with 76.5% of the vote in 2019 as a member of the PDP. Adaelu originally sought re-election in the PDP but withdrew from the primary before defecting to APGA in May 2022 and obtaining its nomination.

=== General election ===
==== Results ====
2023 Obingwa/Ugwunagbo/Osisioma Federal Constituency election
Party	Candidate	Votes	%
APP	Paul Sunny-Daniel Uwandu		
ADC	Uzoamaka Emerole		
APC	Timothy Charles Chidiebere		
APGA	Solomon Adaelu		
LP	Munachim Alozie		
New Nigeria Peoples Party	Desmond Obinna Iherie		
PDP	Chinwendu Nwanganga		
SDP	John Irokwe		
YPP	Michael Ibe Nwoke		
Total votes			100.00%
Invalid or blank votes			N/A
Turnout			

== Ukwa East/Ukwa West ==
2023 Ukwa East/Ukwa West Federal Constituency election
- 25 February 2023
Nominee	Nnadozie Okpokiri	Adinigwe Nwoke	Christian Nkwonta
Party	APC	APGA	PDP
Representative before election
Uzoma Nkem-Abonta
PDP
Elected Representative
Christian Nkwonta
PDP

The Ukwa East/Ukwa West Federal Constituency covers the local government areas of Ukwa East and Ukwa West. Incumbent Uzoma Nkem-Abonta (PDP), who was elected with 43.4% of the vote in 2019, decided to run for senator for Abia South instead of seeking re-election; he later withdrew from the senatorial primary.

=== General election ===
==== Results ====
2023 Ukwa East/Ukwa West Federal Constituency election
Party	Candidate	Votes	%
APP	Uzoma Sylvanus Nwaji		
ADC	Lawson Akpulonu		
APC	Nnadozie Okpokiri		
APGA	Adinigwe Nwoke		
LP	Irene Agwabunma Stanley		
New Nigeria Peoples Party	Okechukwu Chinedu Nwokeocha		
PRP	Eze Lucky Nwoloki		
PDP	Christian Nkwonta		
SDP	Samuel Amaechi		
YPP	Benson Bright Ogolo		
Total votes			100.00%
Invalid or blank votes			N/A
Turnout			

== Umuahia North/Umuahia South/Ikwuano ==
2023 Umuahia North/Umuahia South/Ikwuano Federal Constituency election
- 25 February 2023
Nominee	Obilo Ogbonna	Ogbonna Abarikwu	Chinedum Enyinnaya Orji
Party	APC	APGA	PDP
Nominee	Obinna Aguocha
Party	LP
Representative before election
Samuel Onuigbo
APC
Elected Representative
Obinna Aguocha
LP

The Umuahia North/Umuahia South/Ikwuano Federal Constituency covers the local government areas of Ikwuano, Umuahia North, and Umuahia South. Incumbent Samuel Onuigbo (APC) was elected with 46.0% of the vote in 2019 as a member of the PDP; he decamped to the APC in December 2020. Onuigbo decided not to seek re-election, instead opting to run for senator for Abia Central.

=== General election ===
==== Results ====
2023 Umuahia North/Umuahia South/Ikwuano Federal Constituency election
Party	Candidate	Votes	%
AA	Susan Okorie-Ejikeme		
APP	Nnamdi Ogbuagu		
ADC	Lawrence Nwosu Obinna		
APC	Obilo Ogbonna		
APGA	Ogbonna Abarikwu		
APM	Obiajunwa Emmanuel Ijebuonwu		
LP	Obinna Aguocha		
NRM	Ekperechi Christian Ibekwe		
New Nigeria Peoples Party	Patience Ularinma Okorie		
PDP	Chinedum Enyinnaya Orji		
SDP	Ikemefula Ogbuehi		
YPP	Friday Chimobi Ogbundiogu		
Total votes			100.00%
Invalid or blank votes			N/A
Turnout			

== See also ==
- 2023 Nigerian House of Representatives election
- 2023 Nigerian elections
- 2023 Abia State elections
