= Nigerian National Assembly delegation from Abia =

Abia's delegation in Nigeria's National Assembly

The Nigerian National Assembly delegation from Abia comprises three Senators representing Abia Central, Abia South, and Abia North, and eight Representatives representing Ikwuano/Umuahia North/Umuahia South, Bende, Isuikwato/Umunneochi, Arochukwu/Ohafia, Aba North/Aba South, Ukwa East/Ukwa West, Isiala Ngwa North/South and Obingwa/Osisioma/Ugbunagbo.

== Fourth Republic ==
=== The 4th National Assembly (1999–2003) ===
The senators and representatives of the 4th National Assembly were:

OFFICE	NAME	PARTY	CONSTITUENCY	TERM
Senator	Bob Nwannunu	ANPP	Abia Central	1999–2003
Senator	Adolphus Wabara	PDP	Abia South	1999–2003
Senator	Ike Nwachukwu	PDP	Abia North	1999–2003
Representative	Iheanacho Obioma	PDP	Ikwuano/Umuahia North/Umuahia South	1999–2003
Representative	Njoku Nnamdi	PDP	Bende	1999–2003
Representative	Uchechukwu N. Maduako	PDP	Isuikwato/Umunneochi	1999–2003
Representative	Mao Arukwe Ohuabunwa	PDP	Arochukwu/Ohafia	1999–2003
Representative	Anthony Eze Enwereuzor	ANPP	Aba North/Aba South	1999–2003
Representative	Macebuh Chinonyerem	PDP	Ukwa East/Ukwa West	1999–2003
Representative	Nwakanwa Chimaobi	PDP	Isiala Ngwa North/South	1999–2003
Representative	Clifford Ohiagu	PDP	Obingwa/Osisioma/Ugbunagbo	1999–2003

=== The 5th National Assembly (2003–2007) ===
The senators and representatives of the 5th National Assembly were:

OFFICE	NAME	PARTY	CONSTITUENCY	TERM
Senator	Chris Adighije	PDP	Abia Central	2003–2007
Senator	Adolphus Wabara	PDP	Abia South	2003–2007
Senator	Uche Chukwumerije	PDP	Abia North	2003–2007
Representative	Emeka Atuma	PDP	Ikwuano/Umuahia North/Umuahia South	2003–2007
Representative	Mba Ajah	PDP	Bende	2003–2007
Representative	Uchechukwu N. Maduako	PDP	Isuikwato/Umunneochi	2003–2007
Representative	Mao Arukwe Ohuabunwa	PDP	Arochukwu/Ohafia	2003–2007
Representative	Nnanna Uzor Kalu	AD	Aba North/Aba South	2003–2007
Representative	Macebuh Chinonyerem	PDP	Ukwa East/Ukwa West	2003–2007
Representative	Anayo Damian Ozurumba	PDP	Isiala Ngwa North/South	2003–2007
Representative	Nkechi Justina Nwaogu	PDP	Obingwa/Osisioma/Ugbunagbo	2003–2007

=== The 6th National Assembly (2007–2011) ===
The senators and representatives of the 6th National Assembly were:

OFFICE	NAME	PARTY	CONSTITUENCY	TERM
Senator	Nkechi Justina Nwaogu	PDP	Abia Central	2007–2011
Senator	Enyinnaya Abaribe	PDP	Abia South	2007–2011
Senator	Uche Chukwumerije	PPA	Abia North	2007–2011
Representative	Stanley U. Ohajuruka	PPA	Ikwuano/Umuahia North/Umuahia South	2007–2011
Representative	Nnenna Ijeome Ukeje	PDP	Bende	2007–2011
Representative	Nkiru Onyejiocha	PDP	Isuikwato/Umunneochi	2007–2011
Representative	Uduma Kalu	PDP	Arochukwu/Ohafia	2007–2011
Representative	Nnanna Uzor Kalu	PPA	Aba North/Aba South	2007–2011
Representative	Uzoma Nkem Abonta	PDP	Ukwa East/Ukwa West	2008–2011
Representative	Chineye Fredinard Ike	PDP	Isiala Ngwa North/South	2007–2011
Representative	Eziuchi Chinwe Ubani	PDP	Obingwa/Osisioma/Ugbunagbo	2007–2011

=== The 7th National Assembly (2011–2015) ===
The senators and representatives for the 7th National Assembly were:

OFFICE	NAME	PARTY	CONSTITUENCY	TERM
Senator	Nkechi Justina Nwaogu	PDP	Abia Central	2011–2015
Senator	Enyinnaya Abaribe	PDP	Abia South	2011–2015
Senator	Uche Chukwumerije	PDP	Abia North	2011–2015
Representative	Udo Ibeji	PDP	Ikwuano/Umuahia North/Umuahia South	2011–2015
Representative	Nnenna Ijeome Ukeje	PDP	Bende	2011–2015
Representative	Nkiru Onyejiocha	PDP	Isuikwato/Umunneochi	2011–2015
Representative	Arua Arunsi	PDP	Arochukwu/Ohafia	2011–2015
Representative	Uzo Azubuike	PDP	Aba North/Aba South	2011–2015
Representative	Uzoma Nkem Abonta	PDP	Ukwa East/Ukwa West	2011–2015
Representative	Chineye Fredinard Ike	PDP	Isiala Ngwa North/South	2011–2015
Representative	Eziuchi Chinwe Ubani	PDP	Obingwa/Osisioma/Ugbunagbo	2011–2015

=== The 8th National Assembly (2015–2019) ===
The senators and representatives for the 8th National Assembly were:

Office	Name	Party	Constituency	Term
Senator	Theodore Orji	PDP	Abia Central	2015–2019
Senator	Enyinnaya Abaribe	PDP	Abia South	2015–2019
Senator	Mao Ohuabunwa	PDP	Abia North	2015–2019
Representative	Samuel Ifeanyi Onuigbo	PDP	Ikwuano/Umuahia North/Umuahia South	2015–2019
Representative	Elendu-Ukeje Nnenna	PDP	Bende	2015–2019
Representative	Nkeiruka Onyejeocha	PDP	Isuikwato/Umunneochi	2015–2019
Representative	Uko Nkole	PDP	Arochukwu/Ohafia	2015–2019
Representative	Ossy Chinedu Prestige	APGA	Aba North/Aba South	2015–2019
Representative	Abonta Uzoma Nkem	PDP	Ukwa East/Ukwa West	2015–2019
Representative	Darlington Nwokocha	PDP	Isiala Ngwa North/South	2015–2019
Representative	Solomon Adaelu	PDP	Obingwa/Osisioma/Ugbunagbo	2015–2019

=== The 9th National Assembly (2019–2023) ===
The senators and representatives for the 9th National Assembly were:

Office	Name	Party	Constituency	Term
Senator	Theodore Orji	PDP	Abia Central	2019–2023
Senator	Enyinnaya Abaribe	PDP	Abia South	2019–2023
Senator	Orji Uzor Kalu	APC	Abia North	2019–2023
Representative	Ossy Chinedu Prestige	APGA	Aba North/Aba South	2019–2021
Representative	Chimaobi Ebisike	PDP	Aba North/Aba South	2021–2023
Representative	Uko Nkole	PDP	Arochukwu/Ohafia	2019–2023
Representative	Benjamin Kalu	APC	Bende	2019–2023
Representative	Samuel Ifeanyi Onuigbo	PDP	Ikwuano/Umuahia North/Umuahia South	2019–2023
Representative	Darlington Nwokocha	PDP	Isiala Ngwa North/Isiala Ngwa South	2019–2023
Representative	Nkeiruka Onyejeocha	APC	Isuikwato/Umunneochi	2019–2023
Representative	Solomon Adaelu	PDP	Obingwa/Osisioma/Ugbunagbo	2019–2023
Representative	Abonta Uzoma Nkem	PDP	Ukwa East/Ukwa West	2019–2023
