= 2023 Nigerian Senate elections in Abia State =

Senate elections in Abia

- 25 February 2023

All 3 Abia State seats in the Senate of Nigeria
	Majority party	Minority party	Third party
Party	APC	APGA	PDP
Last election	1	0	2
Seats before	1	1	1
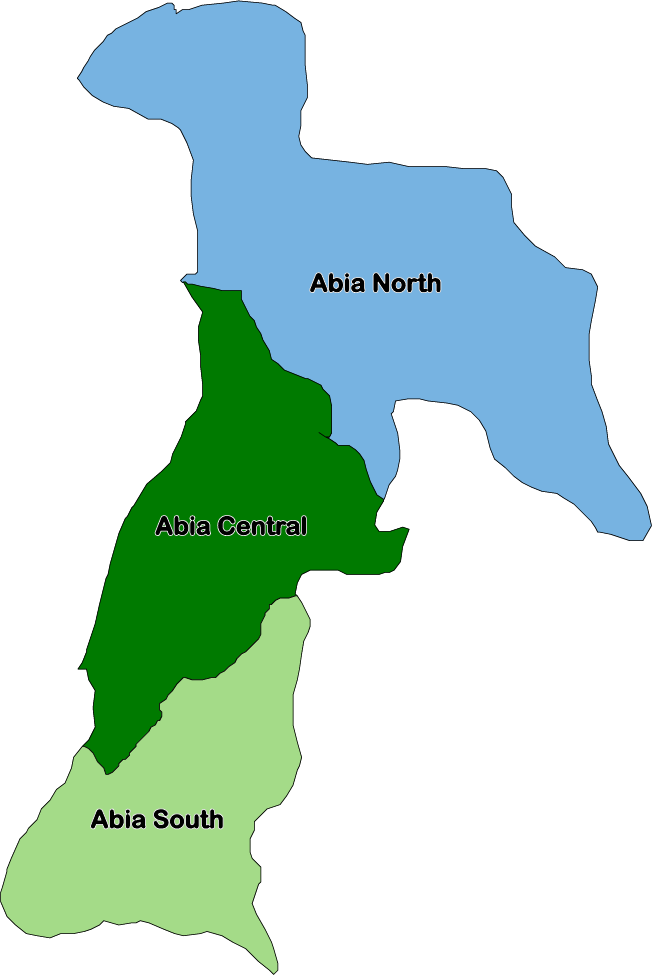
- APC incumbent running for re-election APGA incumbent running for re-election PDP incumbent retiring

The 2023 Nigerian Senate elections in Abia State were held on 25 February 2023, to elect the 3 federal Senators from Abia State, one from each of the state's three senatorial districts. The elections will coincide with the 2023 presidential election, as well as other elections to the Senate, and elections to the House of Representatives; with state elections being held two weeks later. Primaries were held between 4 April and 9 June 2022.

After the election, the candidate of the Labour Party, Darlington Nwokocha was declared winner, but a court ruling nullified the results and declared the Peoples Democratic Party, Augustine Akobundu winner

== Background ==
In terms of the previous Senate elections, incumbent PDP senators Theodore Orji and Enyinnaya Abaribe won re-election by 24% in the Central District and 27% in the South District, respectively. On the other hand, fellow incumbent PDP senator Mao Ohuabunwa lost by 16% in the North District to former Governor Orji Uzor Kalu (APC). This result was the clearest example of the APC's gains in the state as the party also won two House of Representatives seats and slightly cut into the PDP's margin presidentially. However, state elections were easily swept by the PDP with incumbent Governor Okezie Ikpeazu winning by over 37% and most House of Assembly seats were won by the party.

During their terms, all three senators were high-profile as Abaribe was appointed Senate Minority Leader after the swearing-ins, Kalu was convicted of fraud and briefly imprisoned before winning an appeal, and Orji was also embroiled in corruption investigations and was briefly arrested. Later in the term, Abaribe resigned as Minority Leader and defected to APGA in order to run for re-election to the Senate.

== Overview ==
Affiliation	Party				Total
Affiliation	APC	APGA	PDP	LP	Total
Previous Election	1	0	2	0	3
Before Election	1	1	1	0	3
After Election	1	1	0	1	3

== Summary ==
District	Incumbent		Results	
District	Incumbent	Party	Status	Candidates
Abia Central	Theodore Orji	PDP	Incumbent retired New member elected LP gain	▌ Darlington Nwokocha (LP); ▌Sam Onuigbo (APC); ▌Ahamdi Emmanuel Nweke (APGA); ▌ ✓ Augustine Akobundu (PDP)
Abia North	Orji Uzor Kalu	APC	Incumbent re-elected	▌ ✓ Orji Uzor Kalu (APC); ▌Carol Dike-Okorafor (APGA); ▌Mao Ohuabunwa (PDP)
Abia South	Enyinnaya Abaribe	APGA (Note: This senator was elected as a member of the PDP but switched to APGA during their term.)	Incumbent re-elected	▌ ✓ Enyinnaya Abaribe (APGA); ▌Blessing Nwagba (APC); ▌Okezie Ikpeazu (PDP)

== Abia Central ==
2023 Abia Central Senatorial District election
- 25 February 2023
Nominee	Samuel Onuigbo	Ahamdi Emmanuel Nweke	Augustine Akobundu
Party	APC	APGA	PDP
Nominee	Darlington Nwokocha
Party	LP
Senator before election
Theodore Orji
PDP
Elected Senator
Augustine Akobundu
PDP

The Abia Central district covers Ikwuano, Isiala Ngwa North, Isiala Ngwa South, Umuahia North, and Umuahia South local government areas. The incumbent is Theodore Orji (PDP), who was re-elected with 51.9% of the vote in 2019. In December 2020, Orji confirmed that he was planning on retiring in 2023.

=== Primary elections ===
==== All Progressives Congress ====
On 20 April 2022, the APC National Executive Committee announced the party's schedule for senatorial primaries, setting its expression of interest form price at ₦3 million and nomination form price at ₦17 million with a 50% discount for candidates younger than 40 while women and candidates with disabilities get free nomination forms. Forms were to be sold from 26 April to 6 May until the deadline was later extended to 10 May then 12 May. After the submission of nomination forms by 13 May, candidates were screened by a party committee on 14 and 15 May while 18 May was the date for the screening appeal process. Ward congresses and LGA congresses were set for 16 and 17 May to elect delegates for the primary. Candidates approved by the screening process advanced to a primary set for 27 May, in concurrence with other APC senatorial primaries; challenges to the result could be made on 28 May.

On the date of the primary, the primary committee chairman noted discrepancies in the delegate lists before postponing the vote until the next day; earlier on 27 May, a candidate—former Senator Nkechi Nwogu—withdrew over the state party's internal crisis. On 28 May, Samuel Onuigbo—House of Representatives member for Umuahia North/Umuahia South/Ikwuano—won the primary, defeating former Commissioner for Industry Henry Ikoh by a 2% margin. However, in the weeks after the primary, a plan to substitute in Emeka Atuma as the nominee was concocted by some state APC leadership members; the plan went into motion in June when a 7 June rerun primary was won by Atuma and the APC submitted its list of senatorial nominees to INEC with Atuma instead of Onuigbo. In response, Onuigbo sued before a High Court in Abuja to stop the substitution plot. Although the court dismissed Onuigbo's lawsuit in October, his appeal was successful as a late December Court of Appeal judgment ordered INEC to recognize him as the APC nominee. As both politicians awaited the Supreme Court ruling in late January, some elements of the Abia APC (including the Tinubu/Shettima Campaign Organisation) continued to label Atuma as the Central senatorial nominee. However, the apex court upheld the Court of Appeal judgment and maintained Onuigbo as the valid nominee.

APC primary results
Party	Candidate	Votes	%
APC	Samuel Onuigbo	157	50.81%
APC	Henry Ikoh	152	49.19%
Total votes		309	100.00%
Invalid or blank votes		9	N/A
Turnout		318	100.00%

==== All Progressives Grand Alliance ====
On 25 March 2022, the national APGA announced its senatorial primary schedule, setting its expression of interest form price at ₦2.5 million and the nomination form price at ₦7.5 million with a 50% discount for women candidates and candidates with disabilities. Forms were to be sold from 29 March to 11 April but the deadline was extended to 15 April; after the submission of forms, senatorial candidates were screened by a party committee on 20 and 21 April while the screening appeal process was held on 3 May. Ward congresses were set for 10 May to elect delegates for the primary. Candidates approved by the screening process advanced to a primary set for 28 May, in concurrence with all other APGA senatorial primaries; challenges to the result could be made on 30 May.

In the primary, Ahamdi Emmanuel Nweke—the APGA senatorial nominee in 2015 and 2019—was the sole candidate in the primary and won unopposed.

APGA primary results
Party	Candidate	Votes	%
APGA	Ahamdi Emmanuel Nweke	185	99.46%
APGA	"Absent"	1	0.54%
Total votes		186	Unknown

==== People's Democratic Party ====
On 16 March 2022, the national PDP announced its senatorial primary timetable, setting its expression of interest form price at ₦1 million and the nomination form price at ₦20 million with a 50% discount for candidates between 25 and 30. Forms were to be sold until 1 April but the party later extended the deadline four times before reaching a final deadline of 22 April. After the submission of nomination forms by 25 April, candidates were screened by a party committee on 27 April while 2 May was the rescheduled date for the screening appeal process. Ward congresses were set for 29 April and LGA congresses were rescheduled for 10 May to elect delegates for the primary. Candidates approved by the screening process advanced to a primary set for 23 May, in concurrence with other PDP senatorial primaries but due to often violently enforced Monday stay-at-home orders by separatists, southeastern state parties held their primaries on 24 May; challenges to the result could be made on 25 May.

On the primary date, the screened candidates contested an indirect primary that ended in Austin Akobundu's victory. Akobundu, the former Minister of State for Defense, won with nearly 99% of the votes cast and electoral officer Amah Abraham labeled the primary as free, fair, and peaceful.

PDP primary results
Party	Candidate	Votes	%
PDP	Austin Akobundu	186	98.94%
PDP	Ugwuzor Ihuoma Chukwuemeka	1	0.53%
PDP	Chuku Wachuku (withdrawn)	1	0.53%
Total votes		188	100.00%
Invalid or blank votes		0	N/A
Turnout		188	100.00%

=== General election ===
2023 Abia Central Senatorial District election
Party	Candidate	Votes	%
AAC	Iheanyichukwu Dennis Ubani		
ADC	John Godson	1,980	1.3%
APC	Samuel Onuigbo	7,997	5%
APGA	Ahamdi Emmanuel Nweke	4,637	2.9%
BP	Nduka Chijioke Timothy		
LP	Darlington Nwokocha		
New Nigeria Peoples Party	Aiyelabegan Abdul	514	0.3%
NRM	Ibekwe Kennry Chimezie Olekanma	587	3.7%
PDP	Augustine Akobundu		
SDP	Patrick Nwosu	1,030	0.6%
YPP	Chuku Wachuku	7,395	4.7%
Total votes			100.00%
Invalid or blank votes			
Turnout			

== Abia North ==
2023 Abia North Senatorial District election
- 25 February 2023
Nominee	Orji Uzor Kalu	Carol Dike-Okorafor	Mao Ohuabunwa
Party	APC	APGA	PDP
Senator before election
Orji Uzor Kalu
APC
Elected Senator
To be determined
To be determined

The Abia North district covers Arochukwu, Bende, Isuikwuato, Ohafia, and Umu Nneochi local government areas. The incumbent is Orji Uzor Kalu (APC), who was elected with 48.6% of the vote in 2019. In January 2022, Kalu announced that he would seek the APC presidential nomination; however, he withdrew from the presidential primary in May and opted to run for re-election to the Senate.

=== Primary elections ===
==== All Progressives Congress ====
On 20 April 2022, the APC National Executive Committee announced the party's schedule for senatorial primaries, setting its expression of interest form price at ₦3 million and nomination form price at ₦17 million with a 50% discount for candidates younger than 40 while women and candidates with disabilities get free nomination forms. Forms were to be sold from 26 April to 6 May until the deadline was later extended to 10 May then 12 May. After the submission of nomination forms by 13 May, candidates were screened by a party committee on 14 and 15 May while 18 May was the date for the screening appeal process. Ward congresses and LGA congresses were set for 16 and 17 May to elect delegates for the primary. Candidates approved by the screening process advanced to a primary set for 27 May, in concurrence with other APC senatorial primaries; challenges to the result could be made on 28 May.

When Kalu was running for president, two candidates—Fabian Nwankwo and Ijeagu Emeaba—entered the primary to replace him but both withdrew on the primary day in favour of Kalu's candidacy. Thus Kalu won the primary in Ohafia unopposed. In his acceptance speech, Kalu thanked the delegates and the withdrawn candidates along with his constituents.

APC primary results
Party	Candidate	Votes	%
APC	Orji Uzor Kalu	777	100.00%
Total votes		777	100.00%
Invalid or blank votes		0	N/A
Turnout		777	100.00%

==== All Progressives Grand Alliance ====
On 25 March 2022, the national APGA announced its senatorial primary schedule, setting its expression of interest form price at ₦2.5 million and the nomination form price at ₦7.5 million with a 50% discount for women candidates and candidates with disabilities. Forms were to be sold from 29 March to 11 April but the deadline was extended to 15 April; after the submission of forms, senatorial candidates were screened by a party committee on 20 and 21 April while the screening appeal process was held on 3 May. Ward congresses were set for 10 May to elect delegates for the primary. Candidates approved by the screening process advanced to a primary set for 28 May, in concurrence with all other APGA senatorial primaries; challenges to the result could be made on 30 May.

Carol Dike-Okorafor was listed as the APGA nominee.

==== People's Democratic Party ====
On 16 March 2022, the national PDP announced its senatorial primary timetable, setting its expression of interest form price at ₦1 million and the nomination form price at ₦20 million with a 50% discount for candidates between 25 and 30. Forms were to be sold until 1 April but the party later extended the deadline four times before reaching a final deadline of 22 April. After the submission of nomination forms by 25 April, candidates were screened by a party committee on 27 April while 2 May was the rescheduled date for the screening appeal process. Ward congresses were set for 29 April and LGA congresses were rescheduled for 10 May to elect delegates for the primary. Candidates approved by the screening process advanced to a primary set for 23 May, in concurrence with other PDP senatorial primaries but due to often violently enforced Monday stay-at-home orders by separatists, southeastern state parties held their primaries on 24 May; challenges to the result could be made on 25 May.

On the primary date, the four candidates contested an indirect primary that ended with former Senator Mao Ohuabunwa emerging as the nominee after results showed him defeating MHR Uko Nkole by a 61% margin.

PDP primary results
Party	Candidate	Votes	%
PDP	Mao Ohuabunwa	135	77.58%
PDP	Uko Nkole	29	16.67%
PDP	Ernest Mba Ajah	10	5.75%
PDP	Igwe Orji	0	0.00%
Total votes		174	100.00%
Invalid or blank votes		1	N/A
Turnout		175	100.00%

=== General election ===
2023 Abia North Senatorial District election
Party	Candidate	Votes	%
ADC	Martins Emetu		
APC	Orji Uzor Kalu	30,805	
APGA	Carol Dike-Okorafor		
APM	Nnenna Emmanuela Nwosu		
APP	Ifeanyichukwu Kingsley Adijeh		
LP	Nnamdi Iro Oji	27,540	
New Nigeria Peoples Party	Saidu Ahmed		
NRM	Chinonyerem Wogu		
PDP	Mao Ohuabunwa	15,175	
SDP	Uche Brown Echewe		
YPP	Ahanna Orji Igwe		
Total votes			100.00%
Invalid or blank votes			
Turnout			

== Abia South ==
2023 Abia South Senatorial District election
- 25 February 2023
Nominee	Blessing Nwagba	Enyinnaya Abaribe	Okezie Ikpeazu
Party	APC	APGA	PDP
Senator before election
Enyinnaya Abaribe
APGA
Elected Senator
To be determined
To be determined

The Abia South district covers Aba North, Aba South, Obi Ngwa, Osisioma Ngwa, Ugwunagbo, Ukwa East, and Ukwa West local government areas. The incumbent is Enyinnaya Abaribe (APGA), who was re-elected with 57.4% of the vote in 2019 as a member of the PDP. In December 2021, Abaribe announced that he would run for governor of Abia State, instead of seeking re-election. However, Abaribe withdrew on the date of the PDP gubernatorial primary in May 2022. The next day, he defected to APGA and was nominated by his new party's senatorial primary.

=== Primary elections ===
==== All Progressives Congress ====
On 20 April 2022, the APC National Executive Committee announced the party's schedule for senatorial primaries, setting its expression of interest form price at ₦3 million and nomination form price at ₦17 million with a 50% discount for candidates younger than 40 while women and candidates with disabilities get free nomination forms. Forms were to be sold from 26 April to 6 May until the deadline was later extended to 10 May then 12 May. After the submission of nomination forms by 13 May, candidates were screened by a party committee on 14 and 15 May while 18 May was the date for the screening appeal process. Ward congresses and LGA congresses were set for 16 and 17 May to elect delegates for the primary. Candidates approved by the screening process advanced to a primary set for 27 May, in concurrence with other APC senatorial primaries; challenges to the result could be made on 28 May.

On the date of the primary, candidate Michael Kasarachi Enyinna withdrew at the behest of party leadership. When vote collation was completed later that day, former MHA Blessing Nwagba emerged victorious with 279 votes to 31 votes for Enyinna; six votes were invalid. In her acceptance speech, Nwagba thanked delegates and vowed to win the general election.

APC primary results
Party	Candidate	Votes	%
APC	Blessing Nwagba	279	90.00%
APC	Michael Kasarachi Enyinna (withdrawn)	31	10.00%
Total votes		310	100.00%
Invalid or blank votes		6	N/A
Turnout		316	Unknown

==== All Progressives Grand Alliance ====
On 25 March 2022, the national APGA announced its senatorial primary schedule, setting its expression of interest form price at ₦2.5 million and the nomination form price at ₦7.5 million with a 50% discount for women candidates and candidates with disabilities. Forms were to be sold from 29 March to 11 April but the deadline was extended to 15 April; after the submission of forms, senatorial candidates were screened by a party committee on 20 and 21 April while the screening appeal process was held on 3 May. Ward congresses were set for 10 May to elect delegates for the primary. Candidates approved by the screening process advanced to a primary set for 28 May, in concurrence with all other APGA senatorial primaries; challenges to the result could be made on 30 May.

In the midst of the Abia PDP internal crisis over its gubernatorial primary, reports that Abaribe and APGA discussed his potential defection emerged. These reports were confirmed on 27 May when Abaribe formally joined the party; the next day, Abaribe won the APGA senatorial primary in Aba unopposed. In his acceptance speech, Abaribe thanked the delegates and promised his constituents that he would fight for democracy, equity, and justice.

==== People's Democratic Party ====
On 16 March 2022, the national PDP announced its senatorial primary timetable, setting its expression of interest form price at ₦1 million and the nomination form price at ₦20 million with a 50% discount for candidates between 25 and 30. Forms were to be sold until 1 April but the party later extended the deadline four times before reaching a final deadline of 22 April. After the submission of nomination forms by 25 April, candidates were screened by a party committee on 27 April while 2 May was the rescheduled date for the screening appeal process. Ward congresses were set for 29 April and LGA congresses were rescheduled for 10 May to elect delegates for the primary. Candidates approved by the screening process advanced to a primary set for 23 May, in concurrence with other PDP senatorial primaries but due to often violently enforced Monday stay-at-home orders by separatists, southeastern state parties held their primaries on 24 May; challenges to the result could be made on 25 May.

With Abaribe initially retiring, the PDP senatorial primary was an open race. The primary, held at the Enyimba International Stadium in Aba, was won by Governor Okezie Ikpeazu unopposed. In his acceptance speech, Ikpeazu thanked party leadership and vowed to represent the district well if elected.

PDP primary results
Party	Candidate	Votes	%
PDP	Okezie Ikpeazu	198	100.00%
Total votes		198	100.00%
Invalid or blank votes		0	N/A
Turnout		198	Unknown

=== Campaign ===
After the beginning of the official campaign the month prior, an October analysis piece from The Guardian categorized the election as primarily between Abaribe and Ikpeazu. As a potential boost to Abaribe, pundits noted the rise in smaller parties across the South East in the wake of Charles Chukwuma Soludo (APGA) winning the 2021 Anambra State gubernatorial election and the emergence of Peter Obi (LP) as a major presidential candidate. The election was also categorized as one of several examples of incumbent Governors in competitive Senate races. Reporting on the individual campaigns described the Abaribe campaign's focus on purported failures from Ikpeazu as governor (few infrastructural developments, poor environmental conditions, non-investment in education) along with Abaribe's high-profile opposition to the Buhari administration in the Senate. Later articles reviewing the race noted divides within APGA and the PDP's longtime strength in the area.

=== General election ===
==== Results ====
2023 Abia South Senatorial District election
Party	Candidate	Votes	%
ADP	Wokoleme Ikechukwu David Ajuzie		
APP	Kanu Ndubueze Chukwuemeka Signor		
AAC	Godswill Chinyere Nwankwo		
ADC	Okey Edede		
APC	Blessing Nwagba		
APGA	Enyinnaya Abaribe	49,693	
LP	Chinedu Onyeizu	43,903	
NRM	Joseph Ulu		
PDP	Okezie Ikpeazu	28,422	
SDP	Kenneth Uzoigwe		
YPP	Nwankwo Ezenwa Don Alaoma		
Total votes			100.00%
Invalid or blank votes			N/A
Turnout			

== See also ==
- 2023 Nigerian Senate election
- 2023 Nigerian elections
