= 2019 Nigerian House of Representatives elections in Abia State =

The 2019 Nigerian House of Representatives elections in Abia State was held on February 23, 2019, to elect members of the House of Representatives to represent Abia State, Nigeria.

== Overview ==
Affiliation	Party			Total
Affiliation	APC	APGA	PDP	Total
Before Election	2	1	5	8
After Election	2	1	5	8

== Summary ==
District	Incumbent	Party	Elected Rep	Party
Aba North/Aba South	Ossy Prestige	APGA	Ossy Prestige	APGA
Arochukwu/Ohafia	Uko Nkole	PDP	Uko Nkole	PDP
Bende	Nnenna Elendu Ukeje	APC	Benjamin Kalu	APC
Isiala Ngwa North/Isiala Ngwa South	Darlington Nwokocha	PDP	Darlington Nwokocha	PDP
Isuikwuato/Umunneochi	Nkeiruka Onyejeocha	APC	Nkeiruka Onyejeocha	APC
Obingwa/Ugwunagbo/Osisioma	Solomon Adaelu	PDP	Solomon Adaelu	PDP
Ukwa East/West	Uzoma Nkem-Abonta	PDP	Uzoma Nkem-Abonta	PDP
Umuahia North/South/Ikwuano	Samuel Onuigbo	PDP	Samuel Onuigbo	PDP

== Results ==
=== Aba North/Aba South ===
A total of 10 candidates registered with the Uzo Independent National Electoral Commission to contest in the election. APGA candidate Ossy Prestige won the election, defeating PDP Uzo Azubuike and 8 other party candidates. Prestige received 54.43% of the votes, while Azubuike received 34.25%.

2019 Nigerian House of Representatives election in Abia State
Party	Candidate	Votes	%
APGA	Ossy Prestige	17,496	54.43%
PDP	Uzo Azubuike	11,009	34.25%
Others		3,634	11.31%
Total votes		32,139	100%
APGA hold			

=== Arochukwu/Ohafia ===
A total of 16 candidates registered with the Independent National Electoral Commission to contest in the election. PDP candidate Uko Nkole won the election, defeating APC Nnamdi Iro Orji and 14 other candidates. Nkole received 34.67% of the votes, while Oji received 33.30%.

2019 Nigerian House of Representatives election in Abia State
Party	Candidate	Votes	%
PDP	Uko Nkole	5,723	34.67%
APC	Nnamdi Iro Oji	5,496	33.30%
Others		5,287	32.03%
Total votes		16,506	100%
PDP hold			

=== Bende ===
A total of 11 candidates registered with the Independent National Electoral Commission to contest in the election. APC candidate Benjamin Kalu won the election, defeating PDP Anyaso Chimobi Desmond and 9 other party candidates. Kalu received 51.78% of the votes, while Desmond received 31.62%.

2019 Nigerian House of Representatives election in Abia State
Party	Candidate	Votes	%
APC	Benjamin Kalu	9,138	51.78%
PDP	Anyaso Chimobi Desmond	5,591	31.68%
Others		2,919	16.54%
Total votes		17 648	100%
APC hold			

=== Isiala Ngwa North/Isiala Ngwa South ===
A total of 13 candidates registered with the Independent National Electoral Commission to contest in the election. PDP candidate Darlington Nwokocha won the election, defeating APC Blessing Uwaoma Nwokonneya and 11 other candidates. Nwokocha received 60% of the votes, while Nwokonneya received 20.1%.

2019 Nigerian House of Representatives election in Abia State
Party	Candidate	Votes	%
PDP	Darlington Nwokocha	20,627	60.00%
APC	Blessing Uwaoma Nwokonneya	6,922	20.1%
Others		6,888	20%
Total votes		34,437	100%
PDP hold			

=== Isuikwuato/Umunneochi ===
A total of 14 candidates registered with the Independent National Electoral Commission to contest in the election. APC candidate Nkeiruka Onyejeocha won the election, defeating PDP Jude Udeachara and 12 other candidates. Lado received 52.19% of the votes, while Iyah received 37.42%.

2019 Nigerian House of Representatives election in Abia State
Party	Candidate	Votes	%
APC	Nkeiruka Onyejeocha	14,712	52.19%
PDP	Jude Udeachara	10,064	35.71%
Others		3,412	12.10%
Total votes		28,188	100%
APC hold			

=== Obingwa/Ugwunagbo/Osisioma ===
A total of 14 candidates registered with the Independent National Electoral Commission to contest in the election. PDP candidate Solomon Adaelu won the election, defeating APGA Nwamgwa Charles Lawrence and 12 other party candidates. Adaelu received 76.51% of the votes, while Lawrence received 11.41%.

2019 Nigerian House of Representatives election in Abia State
Party	Candidate	Votes	%
PDP	Solomon Adaelu	41,024	76.51%
APGA	Nwamgwa Charles Lawrence	6,117	11.41%
Others		6,478	12.08%
Total votes		53,619	100%
PDP hold			

=== Ukwa East/West ===
A total of 15 candidates registered with the Independent National Electoral Commission to contest in the election. PDP candidate Uzoma Nkem-Abonta won the election, defeating APGA Nwoloki Lucy Eze and 13 other party candidate. Nkem-Abonta received 43.41% of the votes, while Eze received 27.80%.

2019 Nigerian House of Representatives election in Abia State
Party	Candidate	Votes	%
PDP	Uzoma Nkem-Abonta	7,007	43.41%
APGA	Nwoloki Lucy Eze	4,488	27.80%
Others		4,646	28.78%
Total votes		16,141	100%
PDP hold			

=== Umuahia North/South/Ikwuano ===
A total of 12 candidates registered with the Independent National Electoral Commission to contest in the election. PDP candidate Samuel Onuigbo won the election, defeating APC Apugo Martin Ikechukwu and 10 other candidates. Onuigbo received 46.04% of the votes, while Ikechukwu received 34.95%.

2019 Nigerian House of Representatives election in Abia State
Party	Candidate	Votes	%
PDP	Samuel Onuigbo	30,669	46.04%
APC	Apugo Martin Ikechukwu	23,279	34.95%
Others		12,662	19.01%
Total votes		66,610	100%
PDP hold			
