= Chimaobi =

- Gender: Male
- Language: Igbo

Origin
- Origin: Igbo
- Meaning: God knows the heart
- Region of origin: Igboland

Other names
- Short form: Chima

Chimaobi // is a male given name and occasional surname of Igbo origin that means "God knows the heart”.

== Given name ==
- Chimaobi Sam Atu (born 1982), Nigerian politician.
- Chimaobi Ebisike, Nigerian politician.
- Chimaobi Nwaogazi (born 1979), Nigerian footballer.

== Surname ==
- Nwakanwa Chimaobi, Nigerian politician
