= Ukeje =

Ukeje is a surname. Notable people with the surname include:

- Nnenna Elendu Ukeje (born 1969), Nigerian politician
- OC Ukeje (born 1981), Nigerian actor
- Roseline Ukeje (born 1943), Nigerian jurist
