= Emeka Nnamani =

Emeka Nnamani may refer to:

- Emeka Nnamani (footballer)
- Emeka Nnamani (politician)
