= Njoku Nnamdi =

Nigerian politician

Njoku Nnamdi // is a Nigerian politician and member of the 4th National Assembly representing Bende constituency of Abia State under the umbrella of the People's Democratic Party.

== See also ==
- Nigerian National Assembly delegation from Abia
