= Clifford Ohiagu =

Nigerian politician

Clifford Ohiagu is a Nigerian politician and member of the 4th National Assembly representing Obi Ngwa/Osisioma/Ugwunagbo constituency of Abia State under the umbrella of the People's Democratic Party.

== See also ==
- Nigerian National Assembly delegation from Abia
