= Danladi Bamaiyi =

Nigerian politician

Senator 4th National Assembly
- Constituency: Kebbi South senatorial district

Personal details
- Died: April 2016
- Occupation: Politician

Danladi Bamaiyi was a Nigerian politician. He was a senator who represented Kebbi South senatorial district in the 4th National Assembly between 1999 and 2003. He died in April 2016.

== See also ==
- Nigerian senators of the 4th National Assembly
