= Sam Ohuabunwa =

Nigerian pharmacist, politician and business executive

Mazi Samuel Ohuabunwa OFR, MON, NPOM, KSC
- Iheanyichukwu
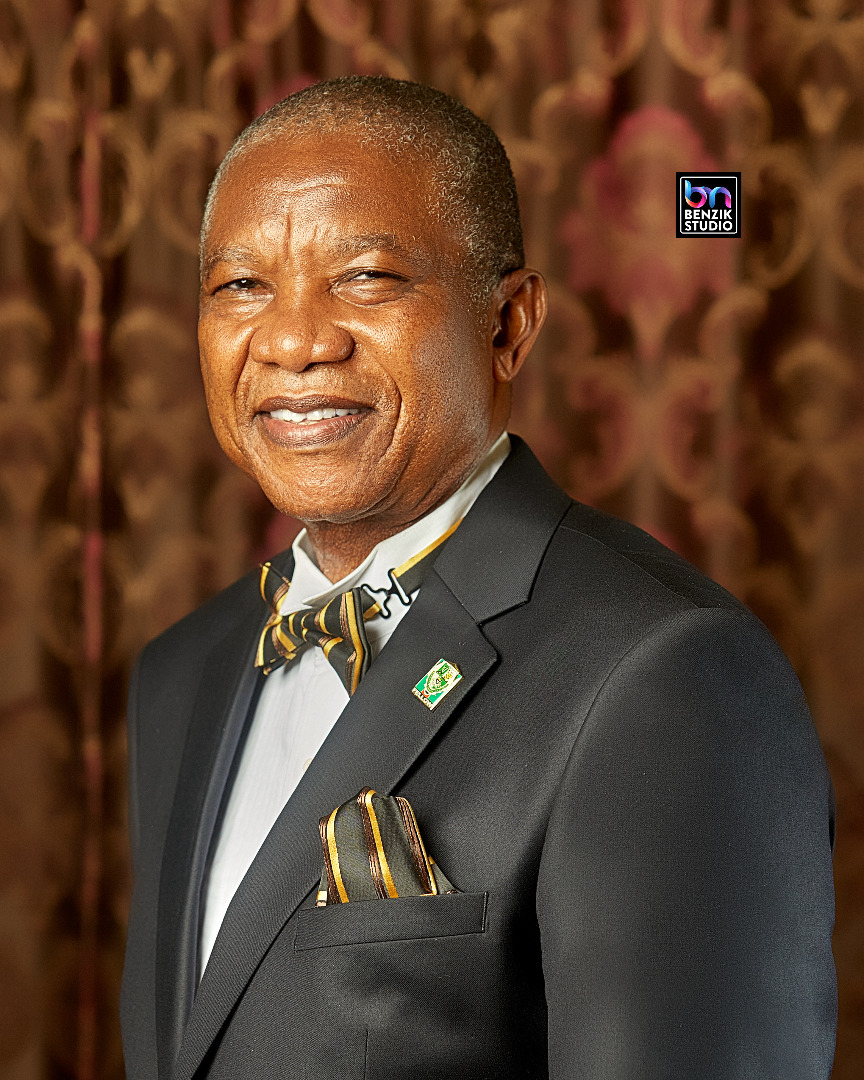
- Mazi Sam Ohabunwa on his 70th birthday in August 2020
- Born: 16 August 1950 (age 75); Port Harcourt
- Education: University of Ife
- Occupations: Pharmacist; Business executive; Politician
- Organization: Neimeth Pharmaceutical
- Known for: founding Neimeth Pharmaceutical
- Relatives: Mao Ohuabunwa

Mazi Samuel Iheanyichukwu Ohuabunwa OFR (born 16 August 1950), is a Nigerian pharmacist, politician and business executive. He is the founder and former CEO of Neimeth Pharmaceutical. He is a former president of the Pharmaceutical Society of Nigeria.

== Early life and education ==
Samuel Ohuabunwa was born on the 16th of August 1950 in Port Harcourt. He began his education at Okrika Grammar School, Okrika. The Nigerian Civil War which started in July 1967 had his education interrupted. He later joined the war and fought for Biafran Army. After the war ended in 1970, he transferred to Government Secondary School, Owerri to complete his education. He obtained his West African School Certificate examination in 1971. He then proceeded to the University of Ife in 1972 to study Pharmacy and graduated in 1976. He had postgraduate training in Business and Organisational Management at the Columbia University, in New York City USA.

== Career ==
After his graduation from Columbia University, Sam joined Pfizer as Sales Representative in 1978. He later became the Managing Director and Chief Executive of Pfizer in Nigeria. In 1997, the headquarters of Pfizer in New York, USA decided to reduce its business operations in Nigeria and offered Sam Ohuabunwa the opportunity to lead a management buy over of their 60% equity investments. This gave rise Neimeth International Pharmaceuticals Plc, an indigenous company today in Nigeria. He named this company in honour of a former president of Pfizer, Mr Robert Neimeth. He retired from his role as CEO of Neimeth PLC in 2011 after serving in that capacity for 18 years. Ohuabunwa is a fellow of the Nigerian Pharmaceutical Society as well as the present Chairman of same body.

Ohuabunwa is the foundation president of the West African Pharmaceutical Manufacturers Association. He was also the Chairman of the Nigerian Economic Summit Group and former chairman of the Manufacturers Association of Nigeria. He is also a Fellow of the West African Post-Graduate College of Pharmacists, Fellow of the Nigerian Academy of Pharmacy, Fellow of the Nigerian Institute of Management and other professional bodies. In the public sector, he was a member of the Presidential Committee on vision 2010 and Vision 2020 national development plans. Mazi Sam has been on the Board of Nigerian Institute Of Social And Economic Research and Nigerian Health Insurance Scheme. He was appointed on the board of the Subsidy Reinvestment and Empowerment Programme (SURE-P) by President Goodluck Jonathan. He was chairman of the governing board of Abia State Polytechnic and also chairman of the board of the Abia State Teaching Hospital. In 2021, he announced his candidacy for the Presidency of Nigeria in the 2023 elections under the newly formed party New Nigeria Group (NNG).

== Awards and recognitions ==
In recognition of his services to Nigeria, he is a recipient of three national honours. In 2001, he was awarded Member of the Order of the Niger (MON) by President Olusegun Obasanjo. In 2011, he was awarded Officer of the Federal Republic (OFR) by President Goodluck Jonathan and the National Productivity Order of Merit (NPOM) in 2018 by President Muhammadu Buhari.

== Personal life ==
Sam Ohuabunwa is married with five children and ten grandchildren. He is a Christian by religion and a Knight of Saint Christopher of the Anglican Communion of Nigeria. He is the National Coordinator of the Strategic Outreaches group of the Full Gospel Business Men's Fellowship. He is the elder brother to Senator Mao Ohuabunwa.
