= 2015 Nigerian Senate elections in Abia State =

2015 Senate elections in Nigeria

The 2015 Nigerian Senate election in Abia State was held on March 28, 2015, to elect members of the Nigerian Senate to represent Abia State. Theodore Orji representing Abia Central, Enyinnaya Abaribe representing Abia South and Mao Ohuabunwa representing Abia North all won on the platform of People’s Democratic Party.

== Overview ==
Affiliation	Party		Total
Affiliation	APC	PDP	Total
Before Election	0	3	3
After Election	0	3	3

== Summary ==
District	Incumbent	Party	Elected Senator	Party
Abia Central	Nwaogu Nkechi Justina	PDP	Theodore Orji	PDP
Abia South	Eyinnaya Abaribe	PDP	Enyinnaya Abaribe	PDP
Abia North	Chukwumerije Uche	PDP	Mao Ohuabunwa	PDP

== Results ==
=== Abia Central ===
People's Democratic Party (Nigeria) candidate Theodore Orji won the election, defeating All Progressives Congress candidate Iheanacho Obioma and other party candidates.

2015 Nigerian Senate election in Abia State
Party	Candidate	Votes	%
PDP	Theodore Orji		
APC	Iheanacho Obioma		
Total votes			
PDP hold			

=== Abia South ===
People's Democratic Party (Nigeria) candidate Enyinnaya Abaribe won the election, defeating All Progressives Congress candidate Chinonyerem Macebuh and other party candidates.

2015 Nigerian Senate election in Abia State
Party	Candidate	Votes	%
PDP	Eyinnaya Abaribe		
APC	Chinonyerem Macebuh		
Total votes			
PDP hold			

=== Abia North ===
People's Democratic Party (Nigeria) candidate Mao Ohuabunwa won the election, defeating All Progressives Congress candidate Nnennaya Lancaster-Okoro and other party candidates.

2015 Nigerian Senate election in Abia State
Party	Candidate	Votes	%
PDP	Mao Ohuabunwa		
APC	Nnennaya Lancaster-Okoro		
Total votes			
PDP hold			
