= Munachi =

- Gender: Female
- Language: Igbo

Origin
- Origin: Igboland
- Meaning: I and Chi
- Region of origin: Igboland

Other names
- Short forms: Muna, Munach
- Derived: Munachimso

Munachi audio is a feminine Igbo name. Munachi which literally means "I and Chi", is a short form of Munachimso ("I and my Chi journey together").

== Notable people with the name ==
- Munachi Abii, Nigerian actress and rapper
- Munachim Alozie, Nigerian politician
