= Uchechukwu N. Maduako =

Nigerian politician

Uchechukwu N. Maduako // is a Nigerian politician and member of the 4th National Assembly and 5th National Assembly representing Isuikwuato/Umunneochi constituency of Abia State under the flagship of the People's Democratic Party.

== See also ==
- Nigerian National Assembly delegation from Abia
