= Iheanacho =

Iheanacho is both a given name and surname. Notable people with the name include:

- Iheanacho Obioma, Nigerian politician
- Emmanuel Iheanacho, Nigerian politician
- Immanuel Iheanacho, American football player
- Ifeoma Iheanacho (born 1988), Nigerian wrestler
- Kelechi Iheanacho (born 1996), Nigerian footballer
- Kelechi Iheanacho (footballer, born 1981), Nigerian footballer
