= Ibe Osonwa =

House of Reps member from Arochukwu/Ohafia Federal Constituency of Abia State

Ibe Okwara Osonwa
- Occupation: Politician
- Known for: A member of Labour Party

Ibe Okwara Osonwa is a Nigerian politician and member of the Federal House of Representatives from Arochukwu/Ohafia Federal Constituency of Abia State in the 10th National Assembly.

Osonwa, a member of the Labour Party, won the nomination of his party to run for Arochukwu/Ohafia Federal Constituency by consensus. In the February 25, 2023, House of Representatives election, Osonwa received 8,946 votes to beat the candidate of People's Democratic Party (PDP) and the incumbent Deputy Speaker of Abia State, Ifeanyi Uchendu and the candidate of APC Dan Okeke.
