= Uzoma Nkem Abonta =

Nigerian politician

Uzoma Nkem Abonta is a Nigerian politician. He was a member of the Federal House of Representatives, where he represented the Ukwa East and Ukwa West Federal Constituency of Abia State from 2008 to 2011. He was elected under the platform of the Peoples Democratic Party (PDP). He was succeeded by Christian Nkwonta.
