= Anthony Eze Enwereuzor =

Nigerian politician

Anthony Eze Enwereuzor is a Nigerian politician and member of the 4th National Assembly representing Aba North/Aba South constituency of Abia State under the flagship of the All Nigeria Peoples Party.

== See also ==
- Nigerian National Assembly delegation from Abia
