= Macebuh Chinonyerem =

Nigerian politician

Macebuh Chinonyerem is a Nigerian politician and member of the 4th and 5th National Assemblies representing Ukwa East/Ukwa West constituency of Abia State under the umbrella of the People's Democratic Party. He went on to contest for a seat to represent Abia South Senatorial district under the flagship of the All Progressives Congress (APC) at the 2011 general elections.

== See also ==
Nigerian National Assembly delegation from Abia
