= Solomon Adaelu =

Nigerian politician (born 1972)

Solomon Ezinwa Onyemaobi Adaelu

Member of House of Representatives
- In office 2015–2023
- Constituency: Obingwa/Ugwunagbo/Osisioma federal constituency

Personal details
- Born: January 1, 1972 (age 54)
- Party: All Progressives Grand Alliance
- Occupation: Politician

Solomon Ezinwa Onyemaobi Adaelu (born 1 January 1972) is a Nigerian politician. He served as a member representing Obingwa/Ugwunagbo/Osisioma federal constituency in the House of Representatives.

== Early life and political career ==
Solomon Adaelu was born on 1 January 1972 and hails from Abia State. He succeeded Eziuche Chinwe Ubani and was elected in 2015 to the National Assembly, and was re-elected in 2019 for a second term under the Peoples Democratic Party (PDP). He served as Vice Chairman, Committee on Information and Communication Technology. He was unsuccessful in his bid for re-election in 2023.
