= Aba North/Aba South federal constituency =

Federal constituency in Abia State, Nigeria

Aba North/Aba South
- constituency for the House of Representatives
- District: Abia South
- State: Abia, Nigeria

Current constituency
- Party: All Progressives Grand Alliance
- Member: Alex Ikwechegh

Aba North/Aba South is a federal constituency in Abia State, Nigeria. It covers Aba North and Aba South local government areas within the city of Aba. Emeka Nnamani of the Labour Party was declared winner of the 2023 election. He was sacked by the election petition tribunal. Alex Ikwechegh of the All Progressives Grand Alliance (APGA) was declared winner.
