= Iheanacho Obioma =

Nigerian politician

Iheanacho Obioma // is a Nigerian politician and member of the 4th National Assembly representing Ikwuano/Umuahia North/Umuahia South constituency of Abia State under the umbrella of the People's Democratic Party between 1999 and 2003.

He later went on to contest for a seat in the Nigerian Senate to represent Abia Central Senatorial district under the flagship of the All Progressives Congress against the then incumbent governor Theodore Orji.

== See also ==
- Nigerian National Assembly delegation from Abia
