= 2023 Nigerian elections =

Elections in Nigeria

- 2023
- Presidential election
- Turnout: 26.71% (▼8.04pp)
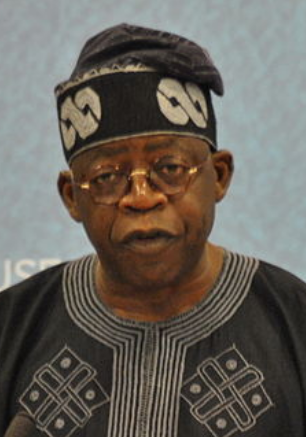

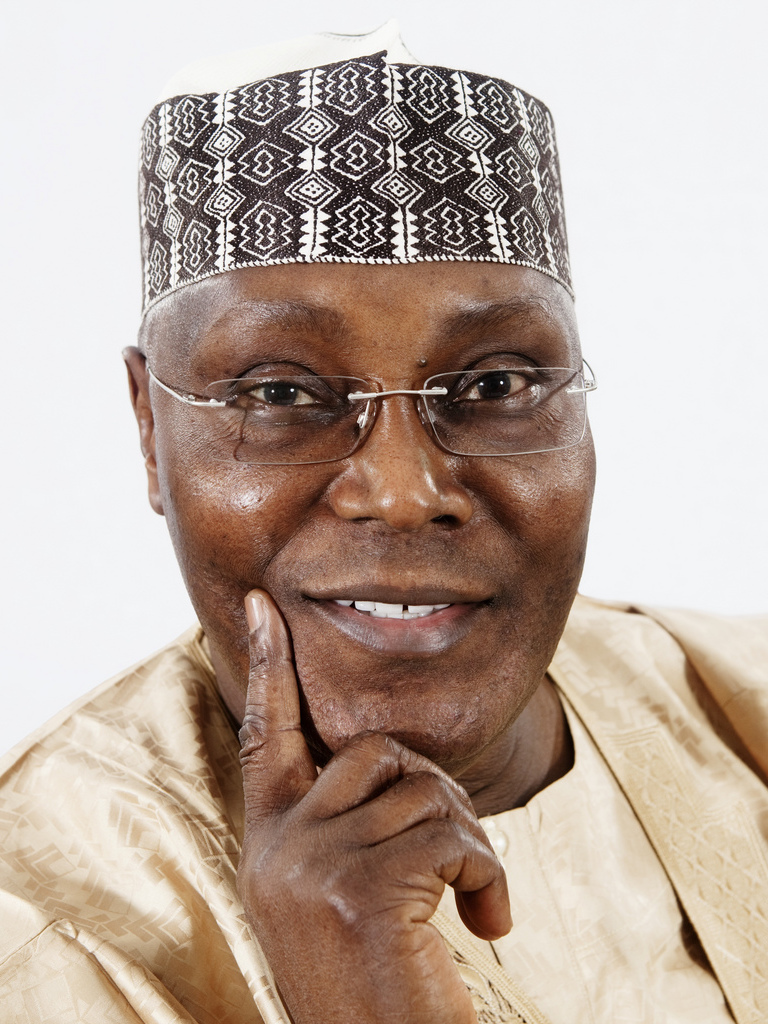

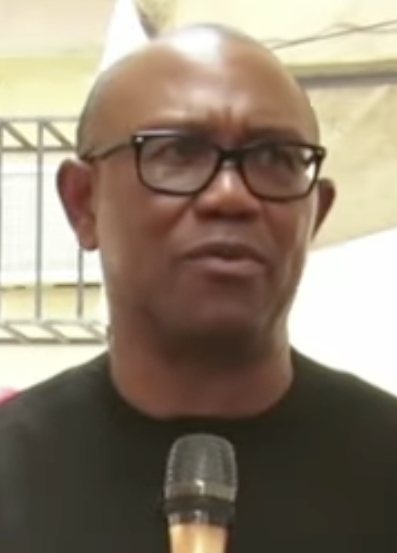

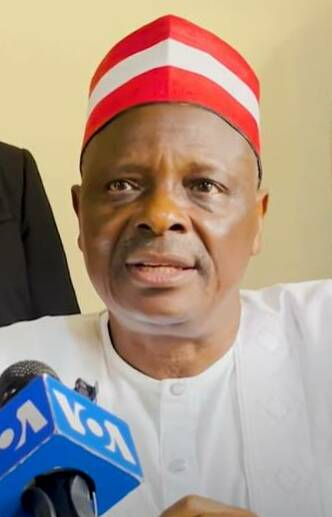
Nominee	Bola Tinubu	Atiku Abubakar
Party	APC	PDP
Home state	Lagos	Adamawa
Running mate	Kashim Shettima	Ifeanyi Okowa
States carried	12	12
Popular vote	8,794,726	6,984,520
Percentage	36.61%	29.07%
Nominee	Peter Obi	Rabiu Kwankwaso
Party	LP	New Nigeria Peoples Party
Home state	Anambra	Kano
Running mate	Yusuf Datti Baba-Ahmed	Isaac Idahosa
States carried	11 + FCT	1
Popular vote	6,101,533	1,496,687
Percentage	25.40%	6.23%
President before election
Muhammadu Buhari
APC
Elected President
Bola Tinubu
APC
- National Assembly elections
Party	Leader	Vote %	Seats	+/–
Senate
APC	Ahmed Ibrahim Lawan			
PDP	Vacant			
YPP	Ifeanyi Ubah (Note: Party's sole member of the Senate)			
APGA	Enyinnaya Abaribe			
New Nigeria Peoples Party	Ibrahim Shekarau			
House of Representatives
APC	Femi Gbajabiamila			
PDP	Ndudi Elumelu			
New Nigeria Peoples Party	Rufai Ahmed Alkali (Note: Party chairman; not a member of the House of Representatives)			
APGA	Victor Ikechukwu Oye			
SDP	Vacant			
LP	Julius Abure			
ADC	Leke Abejide (Note: Party's sole member of the House of Representatives)			
PRP	Umar Abdulkadir Sarki			
Accord	Shina Peller			
This lists parties that won seats. See the complete results below.
- Gubernatorial elections

30 governorships
	Majority party	Minority party	Third party
Party	APC	PDP	APGA

The 2023 Nigerian elections were held in large part on 25 February and 18 March 2023. The president and vice president were elected on 25 February, with incumbent President Muhammadu Buhari ineligible to run, being term-limited. Additionally, there were also elections on the same day for the Senate and the House of Representatives. On 18 March, twenty-eight gubernatorial elections were held alongside elections to state houses of assembly in all 36 states. Three additional gubernatorial elections will be held later in the year alongside potential rerun elections for regularly scheduled elections annulled from earlier in the year.

== Electoral system ==
The President of Nigeria is elected using a modified two-round system with up to three rounds. To be elected in the first round, a candidate must receive a plurality of the votes and over 25% of the vote in at least 24 of the 36 states and the Federal Capital Territory. If no candidate passes this threshold, a second round will be held between the top candidate and the next candidate to have received a majority of votes in the highest number of states. In the second round, a candidate still must receive the most votes and over 25% of the vote in at least 24 of the 36 states and the Federal Capital Territory to be elected. If neither candidate passes this threshold, a third round will be held where just majority of the votes is required to be elected.

The 109 members of the Senate are elected from 109 single-seat constituencies (three in each state and one for the Federal Capital Territory) by first-past-the-post voting. The 360 members of the House of Representatives are also elected by first-past-the-post voting in single-member constituencies.

Similarly to the president, Governors are elected using a modified two-round system. To be elected in the first round, a candidate must receive the plurality of the vote and over 25% of the vote in at least two-thirds of state local government areas. If no candidate passes this threshold, a second round will be held between the top candidate and the next candidate to have received a plurality of votes in the highest number of local government areas.

The 991 members of the state Houses of Assembly are elected using first-past-the-post voting in single-member constituencies.

== Federal elections ==
=== Presidential election ===
==== All Progressives Congress primary ====
With President Muhammadu Buhari having been elected to the office of president twice, he was ineligible for renomination. There was no formal zoning agreement for the APC nomination despite calls from politicians and interest groups such as the Southern Governors' Forum to zone the nomination to the South as Buhari, a northerner, was elected twice. The party held its indirect presidential primary on 8 June 2022 in Abuja and nominated Bola Tinubu former Governor of Lagos State. In mid-June, the APC submitted the name of Kabir Ibrahim Masari—a politician and party operative from Katsina State—as a placeholder vice presidential nominee to be substituted at a later date. On 10 July, Ibrahim Masari formally withdrew as vice presidential nominee and the later that day, Tinubu announced Kashim Shettima—Senator for Borno Central and former Governor of Borno State—as his replacement.

APC ticket
Presidential nominee	Vice Presidential nominee
Bola Tinubu	Kashim Shettima
Governor of Lagos State (1999–2007)	Senator for Borno Central (2019–2023)

==== Labour Party primary ====
On 30 May 2022, shortly after former Governor of Anambra State Peter Obi joined the party from the PDP, the Labour Party held its presidential primary in Asaba where Obi was nominated unopposed. On 17 June, the party submitted the name of Doyin Okupe—a physician and former PDP candidate who became the Director-General of the Obi Campaign Organisation—as a placeholder vice presidential nominee to be substituted for someone else at a later date. On 7 July, Okupe formally withdrew as vice presidential nominee and the next day, Obi announced Yusuf Datti Baba-Ahmed—former Senator for Kaduna North—as his replacement.

LP ticket
Presidential nominee	Vice Presidential nominee
Peter Obi	Yusuf Datti Baba-Ahmed
Governor of Anambra State (2006; 2006–2007; 2007–2014)	Senator for Kaduna North (2011–2012)

==== New Nigeria Peoples Party primary ====
The New Nigeria Peoples Party (NNPP) held its convention and presidential primary election on 8 June 2022 and nominated Rabiu Kwankwaso, who was the sole candidate, as its presidential candidate for the 2023 general election. On 14 July 2022, Kwankwaso picked Isaac Bishop Idahosa as his running mate and vice presidential candidate of the NNPP.

NNPP ticket
Presidential nominee	Vice Presidential nominee
Rabiu Kwankwaso	Isaac Idahosa
Governor of Kano State (1999–2003; 2011–2015)	Bishop of God First Ministry a.k.a. Illumination Assembly (1985–present)

==== People's Democratic Party primary ====
In October 2021, newly elected PDP Chairman Iyorchia Ayu backed the indirect primary method of nominating a presidential candidate instead of the direct or consensus methods. There was no zoning agreement for the PDP nomination despite calls from politicians and interest groups such as the Southern Governors' Forum to zone the nomination to the South as the APC's Buhari, a Northerner, was elected twice. The party held its indirect presidential primary on 28 May 2022 in Abuja and nominated Atiku Abubakar—its 2019 nominee and former Vice President. On 16 June, Abubakar selected Governor of Delta State Ifeanyi Okowa as his running mate.

PDP ticket
Presidential nominee	Vice Presidential nominee
Atiku Abubakar	Ifeanyi Okowa
Vice President of Nigeria (1999–2007)	Governor of Delta State (2015–2023)

=== National Assembly elections ===
==== Senate elections ====
All 109 seats in the Senate of Nigeria was up for election alongside the presidential and House of Representatives elections on 25 February 2023.

==== House of Representatives elections ====
All 360 seats in the House of Representatives of Nigeria was up for election alongside the presidential and Senate elections on 25 February 2023.

== State elections ==
=== Gubernatorial elections ===
Elections will hold for the governorships of thirty-one of the 36 states of Nigeria. All but three were held on 18 March 2023, while the Kogi State, Imo State, and Bayelsa State elections were held on 11 November.

=== House of Assembly elections ===
Elections were held for the House of Assembly of all 36 states of Nigeria on 18 March 2023.

== Local elections ==
At least two statewide local elections were held in 2023:

- Abia: The Abia State Independent Electoral Commission called local elections for 28 April.
- Cross River: The Cross River State Independent Electoral Commission called local elections for 24 May.
