= Udo Ibeji =

Nigerian politician

- Udo Oluchi Ibeji

2011 to 2015

House of Representatives, National Assembly
- Preceded by: Emeka Atioma

Udo Oluchi Ibeji is a Nigerian politician.

He is a former member of the House of Representatives, where he represented the Ikwuano-Umuahia federal constituency of Abia State. Udo was preceded by Emeka Atioma.
