= Bende =

Bende can refer to:

- Bende people, ethnic group in Tanzania
- Bende language, dialect of Tongwe language
- Bende, Nigeria, Local Government Area in Abia, Nigeria
- Bende, sub-municipality of Durbuy, Belgium
