= Nwakanwa Chimaobi =

Nigerian politician

Nwakanwa Chimaobi // is a Nigerian politician and member of the 4th National Assembly representing Isiala Ngwa North/Isiala Ngwa South constituency of Abia State under the platform of the People's Democratic Party.

== See also ==
- Nigerian National Assembly delegation from Abia
