= Neimeth PLC =

Nigerian pharmaceutical company

NEIMETH International Pharmaceuticals PLC is a publicly listed pharmaceutical company founded in 1997 and headquartered in Lagos. It was established by a former managing director of Pfizer Products of Nigeria to acquire some of the trading assets of Pfizer International in Nigeria.

== History ==
=== Pfizer in Nigeria ===
Pfizer began operations in Nigeria in 1957 importing its branded products such as Terramycin into the country. In 1962, it opened a factory at Aba, the first pharmaceutical factory in British West Africa. The Civil war in Nigeria affected production at Pfizer's plant at Aba which caused the firm to commit new investment to build a new plant at Oregun, Lagos. The new factory expanded Pfizer's product offerings to include inject-able drugs.

In the 1990s, the firm faced increased competition from imported generic products from Asia and those manufactured within the country. While, the firm generated majority of its sales through relationships with pharmacists and hospitals, the rise in OTC consumption and importation of generics shifted the firm's focus away from business to business sales of prescription drugs and towards OTCs. The firm increased production of OTC drugs and sales to drug stores and other over the counter retailers.

=== Neimeth ===
In 1997, the parent company's global re-positioning away from OTC drugs led to a management buyout of majority shares. The new firm was named Neimeth International Pharmaceuticals, in honor of a Pfizer executive who provided support to the Nigerian operation. At inception, Neimeth manufactured drugs licensed from Pfizer International, in 2009, Neimeth's in-house research had yielded product that account for 30% of its revenues.

In the middle of 2010s, Neimeth went through a period of losses, at one time, it lost an entire stock of raw materials in a fire incident.

== Products ==
Neimeth's in-house research and development created an herbal remedy for sickle cell crisis management called Ciklavit, with Cajanus cajan as an active ingredient. The drug is one of the offering from its Neimeth Product Group, a strategic business unit of the firm that also markets generic offerings such as Normoretic and flexodene.
