= Austin Akobundu =

Nigerian politician

Austin Okwudiri Akobundu

Senator for Abia Central
- Incumbent
- Assumed office 15 November 2023
- Preceded by: Darlington Nwokocha

Personal details
- Born: 10 March 1956
- Party: ADC (since March 2026)
- Other political affiliations: PDP (Until March 2026)

Austin Okwudiri Akobundu ( born 10 March 1956) is a Nigerian politician who is the current senator representing Abia Central.

== Biography ==
Austin Akobundu is a retired colonel of the Nigerian Army and former Minister of State for Defense under President Goodluck Jonathan's administration. He is the current Senator representing Abia Central in the Senate. He replaced Darlington Nwokocha whose election was nullified by the Court of Appeal on 4 November 2023. He was sworn in on 15 November 2023.

Since arriving in the Senate, Akobundu has been active in supporting access to education and recently facilitated scholarships for 113 students across Local Government Areas in Abia State and trained 400 students on computer skills in Umuahia, Abia State.

Initially representing PDP, Akobundu defected to ADC in March 2026, participating in the Senate primaries ahead of 2027 Nigerian general election.
