= Roseline Ukeje =

Nigerian jurist

Chief Judge of the High Court of Nigeria
- In office 2001–2008

Personal details
- Born: 5 January 1943 (age 83)

Roseline or Rose Nonyem Ukeje (born 5 January 1943) is a Nigerian jurist who served as the first female Chief Judge of the High Court of Nigeria.

== Life ==
Rose Nonyem Ukeje was born on 5 January 1943. She was appointed a judge of the High Court in 1986 and served as Chief Judge from 2001 until 2008.

In February 2007, Ujeke was criticised for removing another justice from the forgery case of Andy Uba, to whom her son Obi Ukeje was personal assistant, without notice and taking over the case. In April 2007, she ruled that the Nigerian general election, 2007 could go ahead despite the death of candidate Adebayo Adefarati.

== Personal life ==
Ukeje was married to Nigerian Air Force pilot Captain Sunday Elendu-Ukeje until his death and they had at least two children. Their daughter, Nnenna Elendu Ukeje, has been a member of the National Assembly since 2007.

== Works ==
- Ukeje, Roseline (1999). "Fundamental Human Rights and Women". The Woman, the Family and the Law. International Federation of Women Lawyers.
