= Isaac Idahosa =

Nigerian politician and religious leader

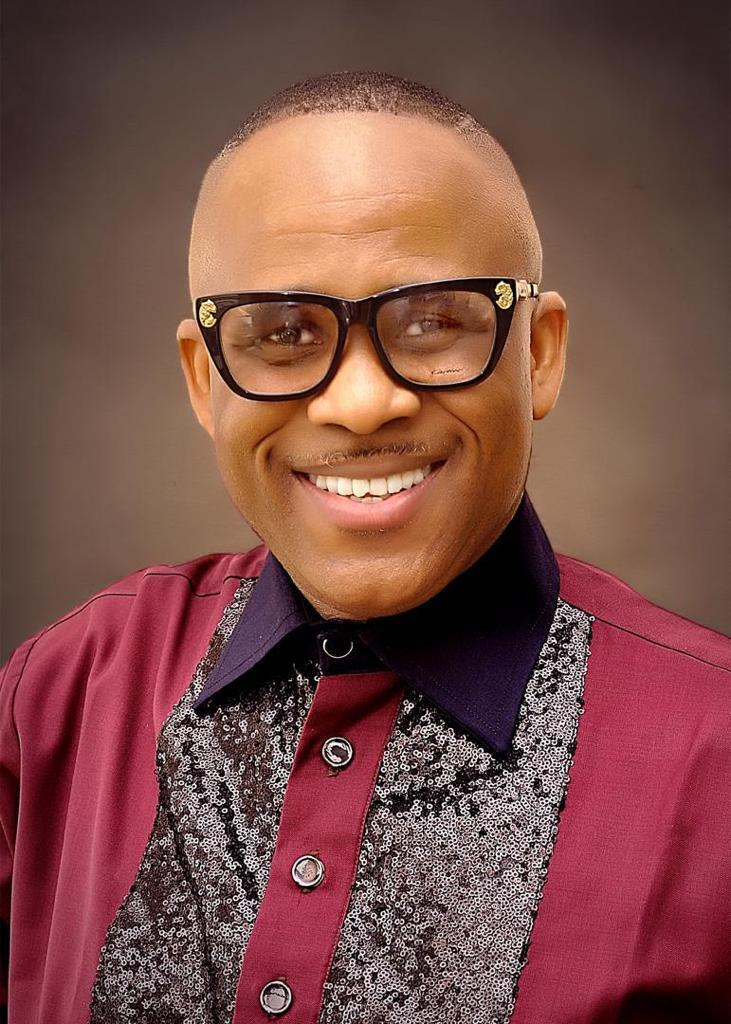
- Born: February 8, 1965 (age 61); Edo State
- Citizenship: Nigerian
- Occupations: Nigerian politician and pastor
- Title: Archbishop Designate
- Political party: NNPP
- Awards: US Presidential Lifetime Achievement Award

Isaac Idahosa (born February 8, 1965), known professionally as Archbishop Designate Isaac Idahosa, is a Nigerian politician and religious leader who served as a running mate to New Nigeria People's Party Presidential Candidate Rabiu Kwankwaso during 2023 Presidential Election. In 2024, he received the prestigious US Presidential Lifetime Achievement Award for his contributions to society.

== Early life and education ==
Idahosa was born on 8 February 1965 in Minna, Niger State, Nigeria. He is from Edo State. He studied Mechanical Engineering and later attended Soul Clear Bible College. Before entering politics, he was a Christian leader who founded God First Ministry, also known as Illumination Assembly, and served as its presiding bishop.

== Political career ==
Idahosa entered national politics when he was selected as the vice presidential candidate for the New Nigeria People's Party in the 2023 presidential election.

== Awards and recognition ==
In 2024, Idahosa was awarded the US Presidential Lifetime Achievement Award, recognizing his significant contributions to humanitarian service and community development.

In 2024, Idahosa was selected as the recipient of the prestigious Nelson Mandela Leadership Award of Excellence and Integrity.
