= Ginger Onwusibe =

Nigerian politician

Rt. Hon Ginger Onwusibe

Member House of Representatives representing Isiala Ngwa South/Isiala Ngwa North
- Incumbent
- Assumed office 29 May 2023
- Governor: Alex Otti
- Preceded by: Darlington Nwokocha

Member Abia State House of Assembly for Isiala Ngwa North
- In office 29 May 2019 – 29 May 2023

Personal details
- Born: Ginger Obinna Onwusibe
- Party: Labour Party
- Education: Abia State University

Ginger Obinna Onwusibe is a Nigerian politician, who has served as a member of the House of Representatives representing Isiala Ngwa South/Isiala Ngwa North federal constituency since 29 May 2023. Onwusibe was elected in the 2023 Nigerian House of Representatives elections in Abia State.
