= Chris Nkwonta =

Nigerian politician

Member of the House of Representatives of Nigeria
- Incumbent
- Assumed office 2023
- Constituency: Ukwa East/Ukwa West

Personal details
- Born: Christian Nkwonta; November 3, 1960 (age 65) Akwete, Abia State, Nigeria
- Party: All Progressives Congress
- Education: Community Secondary School, Akwete; Center for Business Studies, London; University of Cumbria
- Occupation: Politician
- Profession: Maritime, shipping and business executive
- Committees: House Committee on Climate Change; House Committee on South East Development Commission

Christian "Chris" Nkwonta (born November 3, 1960) is a Nigerian politician and the member representing Ukwa East/Ukwa West federal constituency Abia state. He is the Chairman, House of Representatives Committee on Climate change, and also the chairman of House Committee on South East Development Commission (SEDC).

== Early Life and Education ==
Nkwonta, often referred to as Chief Sir Chris Nkwonta (Oke Oji Abia), was born on November 3, 1960, in Akwete, Ukwa East Local Government Area (LGA) of Abia State, Nigeria, to the family of Late Chief Chibor Nkwonta and Mrs. Mercy Opunne Nkwonta.

He had his secondary education at Community Secondary School, Akwete, where he often missed school to engage in farming and fishing, in order to fund his studies because he came from a very humble background. Despite these challenges, he completed his secondary education and pursued higher learning abroad. He had his undergraduate studies in Maritime Studies in the 1981 at the Center for Business Studies, London (now part of the University of Greenwich), graduating successfully. He returned to Nigeria in 1985 to complete his National Youth Service Corps (NYSC) assignment, after which he joined the Nigerian Ports Authority (NPA), beginning his professional career in the maritime sector. He also holds Masters Degree in Business Administration (MBA) with Specialization in Leadership and Sustainability from University of Cumbria, United Kingdom (2012 – 2014).

== Professional Career ==
He has spent over thirty years professionally in maritime, shipping, logistics, oil and gas, and hospitality. After his NYSC, he first worked at the Nigeria Ports Authority, and also other establishments, including

- True Venture Nigeria Limited: 1986 – 1992
- Floor Mills of Nigeria PLC: March – May 1992
- Exon Mobil Limited: 1992 – 1995.
- Fymak Nigeria Limited: 1996 – 1997.
- Shell Petroleum Development Company: 1997 – 2001.

Through all these, he gained expertise in transport and administration, becoming a Professional Member of both the Chartered Institute of Transport and the Chartered Institute of Transport Administration, London, UK. From there, he established BlueSeas Maritime Services in 2003.
