= Arochukwu/Ohafia federal constituency =

Arochukwu/Ohafia
- constituency for the House of Representatives
- District: Abia North
- State: Abia, Nigeria

Current constituency
- Party: Labour Party
- Member: Ibe Osonwa

Arochukwu/Ohafia is a federal constituency in Abia State, Nigeria. It covers Arochukwu and Ohafia local government areas. Arochukwu/Ohafia is represented by Ibe Osonwa of the Labour Party of Nigeria.
