= Ukwa East/Ukwa West federal constituency =

Ukwa East/Ukwa West
- constituency for the House of Representatives
- District: Abia South
- State: Abia, Nigeria

Current constituency
- Party: All Progressives Congress
- Member: Chris Nkwonta

Ukwa East/Ukwa West is a federal constituency in Abia State, Nigeria. It covers Ukwa East and Ukwa West local government areas in the state. Obingwa/Ugwunagbo/Osisioma is represented by Chris Nkwonta of the All Progressives Congress of Nigeria.
