= Blessing Nwagba =

Nigerian politician

Blessing Okwuchi Nwagba

Member of the Abia State House of Assembly
- In office 2011–2020
- Constituency: Aba North

Personal details
- Born: 1959 (age 66–67) Abia State, Nigeria
- Education: B.Sc., M.Sc., Ph.D. in Sociology
- Occupation: Politician, sociologist

Blessing Okwuchi Nwagba // is a Nigerian politician. She is currently serving as a member of the Abia State House of Assembly as the committee chairman on women affairs, social welfare and health representing Aba North Constituency. She is a sociologist by profession and former director of Belzy Pharmaceuticals, Belzy Farms, Belzy Fashion and Fulfillment International Academy and College.

== Education and personal life ==
Blessing Nwagba is from Mbutu Umuojioma Ogbu, Abia State. She was educated at St Clements School Mbutu Umuojioma Ogbu, Federal Government College, Odogbolu and the University of Lagos, graduating with a B.Sc. in sociology in 1983. She earned her Ph.D. in sociology (industrial relations and personnel management) in the University of Port Harcourt, 2014. She married Israel Nwagba, a pharmacist from Osusu-Aba, Abia State, and they have four children.

== Career ==
In 1991 Nwagba started her career in politics as the supervisory Councillors for Health and Social Welfare in the Aba Local government council. It was during her tenure that Aba North was created out of the then Aba Local government council. She later became a member of the Education Authority of Aba North LGA and was an integral part of the government board responsible for policy making at the primary level and also oversaw the running of primary education in Aba North. She moved on to the University College Hospital, Ibadan in 2009 where she was part of a seven-man board inaugurated by the former president of Nigeria, Umaru Musa YarAdua to drive the strategic direction of the premier hospital.

In 2011, she was elected as a member of the Abia State House of Assembly representing Aba North Constituency. In her first term as a legislator, she was the Chairman House Committee on Commerce and Industry and also the Chairman of Women Affairs. During this period, she developed the legislative framework that drove external investment into Abia, ensuring that regulation was well defined for their operations. Sample industries overseen include the Nigerian Bottling Company, Nigerian Breweries, Starline Paper Mills and Guinness. She directed several monitoring exercises to verify the implementation of government industrial policies in major industries and markets such as the Ubani Ibeku market, and the Industrial market. She also sponsored the Abia State bill on institutional support for disability which was passed into law though not accommodated by the Governor.

She drove the Abia State bill on widowhood rights, contributed to debates on both public and private bills proposed and passed into law. She also directed state and federal awareness to key social and infrastructural challenges facing Aba residents with respect to erosion, road and market dilapidation, and overall disruptions to the social order. She called for the rehabilitation of the Ariaria International Market access road and Ukwu Mango (major commercial gateway road). She also called for federal intervention on Eziama erosion, restoring access to the rail line. She organized public hearing and legislative intervention on the Abia State University gang rape incident in October 2011.

On resuming her legislative activities for the second term in March 2016, Nwagba being the only female legislator who made it back to the house was immediately assigned to chair the House Committee on Women Affairs, Social Welfare, and Health. She sponsored a bill on genotype and blood group insertion on identity cards to reduce child mortality rate and other health challenges.

She has also moved the same motion in Abia State House of Assembly restricting cattle menace and the need to reject the proposed bill for the establishment and control of grazing routes/reserves at the National Assembly. She also drew the attention of ASEPA to the heap of debris and refuse along Osusu road, Aba in the effort to create an alternative route as a result of an ongoing road construction on Faulks road.

== International development and non-profit work ==
Nwagba was recently involved in the training of parliamentarians of ten African countries in Côte d'Ivoire, she presented the roadmap on behalf of Nigeria for the elimination of legal and human rights barriers to access of the key population to information and Medicare on HIV/AIDS.

She equally organized and pioneered health intervention program for Abia residents with foreign doctors from Rapha Hans Foundation in the USA where treatments and surgeries were provided free of charge in the area of diabetes, hypertension, and ophthalmology.

On June 23, 2017, she gave free eye care services and issued reading glasses, medication and other items to her constituency during her town hall meeting. She is the founder of Total Blessing Foundation, a charity based organization for education and health.

== Awards and honors ==
Nwagba has received over fifty honours and awards. In 2012, she was given the Women of Worth award by St. Matthew Anglican Church, Aba. In 2014, she was awarded the Odo Abia, the second-highest honor given to women in Abia State, awarded annually by state consensus, for outstanding leadership, service, and impact on the development of the State. In the same year, she was also conferred with the knighthood of the Order of St Mary of the Anglican Diocese of Aba. She was inducted as a member into the Aba Sports Club 1929 in 2009.

== Works ==
- African Journal of Social Sciences, 2014 Vol. 4, Number 1, (183-191); Nwagba, Blessing Okwuchi—“An Evaluation of the Sociological and Developmental Implications of the Security Challenges in Nigeria. The Case for Tourism and Foreign Direct Investment in the Niger Delta.”
- Ph.D. thesis: Department of Sociology, University of Port Harcourt, September 2014. Nwagba, Blessing Okwuchi—“Social Insecurity and Tourism Development in the Niger Delta Region of Nigeria.”
- M.Sc. thesis: Department of Sociology, University of Port Harcourt, September 1986. Nwagba, Blessing Okwuchi—“Effectiveness and Efficiency of Small and Medium Scale Industries in Aba.”
- B.Sc. thesis: Department of Sociology, University of Lagos, August 1983. Nwagba Blessing Okwuchi- a comparative study of the degree of aspiration and frustration of the urban self-employed poor in Lagos and Calabar,
