= Nnenna Elendu Ukeje =

Nigerian politician

Member of the House of Representatives of Nigeria
- In office 2011–2019
- Constituency: Bende Federal Constituency

Personal details
- Party: People's Democratic Party (PDP)
- Occupation: Politician

Nnenna Ijeoma Elendu Ukeje // is a Nigerian politician who was the representative for Bende Federal Constituency, Abia State, Nigeria. Having had a successful career in the private sector, Nnenna was elected to the House of Representatives in 2007, She was re-elected to the position on 29 May 2011 and also served as the Chairman house committee on foreign affairs. In the 2015 general elections she was also re-elected to the house of representative and once again appointed as the house committee chairman on foreign affairs.

== Background ==
Ukeje is from Alayi, Abia State and attended Federal Government Girls' College, Owerri, Imo State. She also attended the University of Benin, Edo State before graduating from the University of Lagos with a bachelor's degree in education.

Ukeje worked in the hotel management industry. Her father Sunday Elendu-Ukeje was a pilot with the Nigerian Air Force and Nigerian Airways prior to his retirement. Her mother, Roseline Ukeje, served as Chief Judge of the Federal High Court prior to her retirement. Nnenna Elendu-Ukeje has experienced discrimination, sexual innuendoes, physical threats and insubordination mainly from male colleagues.

== Political career ==
Ukeje's initial foray into politics was her first election in office in 2007 as the Representative for Bende Federal Constituency, Abia State under the People's Democratic Party. She was re-elected in 2011. In 2015 she was one of 15 women members and of the ten from the People's Democratic Party (Nigeria) who were elected to the 8th National Assembly. The other PDP women were Eucharia Okwunna, Sodaguno Festus Omoni, Nkiruka Chidubem Onyejeocha, Rita Orji, Evelyn Omavowan Oboro, Beni Butmaklar Langtang, Omosede Igbinedion Gabriella, Fatima Binta Bello and Stella Obiageli Ngwu.

On 12 May 2021, the Deputy Chairman of Bende Local Government Area Promise Uzoma Okoro chaired a Grand civic reception in her honour at the Bende Local Government Headquarters. Abia State Governor Okezie Ikpeazu who graced the event as Special guest described her as the priceless jewel of Abia Politics. The Speaker of the 7th Abia State House of Assembly Chinedum Enyinnaya Orji on his part said that the Official Peoples Democratic Party will bounce back in Bende with the return of Ukeje.

Additionally, she has been a vocal supporter of affirmative action and gender parity. During her time in parliament, she played a pivotal role in the passing of several important bills, including those related to public officers protection, minimum wage, broadcasting anti-trust legislation, anti-money laundering and terrorism, asset forfeiture in criminal matters, foreign assistance in criminal matters, Nigeria Financial Intelligence Unit, and non-discrimination against people living with disabilities.
