= Isiala Ngwa North/Isiala Ngwa South federal constituency =

Isiala Ngwa North/Isiala Ngwa South
- constituency for the House of Representatives
- District: Abia Central
- State: Abia, Nigeria

Current constituency
- Party: Labour Party
- Member: Ginger Onwusibe

Isiala Ngwa North/Isiala Ngwa South is a federal constituency in Abia State, Nigeria. It covers Isiala-Ngwa North and Isiala-Ngwa South local government areas. Isiala Ngwa North/Isiala Ngwa South is represented by Ginger Onwusibe of the Labour Party of Nigeria.
