= Ossy Prestige =

Nigerian businessman and politician (1965–2021)

Ossy Chinedu Prestige

Member of the House of Representatives of Nigeria for Aba North/South
- In office 9 June 2015 – 6 February 2021
- Preceded by: Uzo Azubuike

Personal details
- Born: 24 January 1965
- Died: 6 February 2021 (aged 56)
- Party: APGA
- Relations: Married
- Children: 5
- Education: Abia State University
- Occupation: Legislature
- Profession: Businessman
- Religion: Presbyterian
- Website: http://www.ossyprestige.com

Ossy Chinedu Prestige (24 January 1965 – 6 February 2021) was a Nigerian businessman and politician. He served in the 8th House of Representatives.

Ossy Prestige was a member of the APGA and served as the House of Representatives member for Aba North/Aba South Nigeria Federal constituency of Abia State from 2015.

He died on 6 February 2021, in Germany, at the age of 56.

== Early life ==
Ossy was born on 24 January 1965 in Agboji community of Abiriba in Ohafia L.G.A of Abia, Nigeria. He earned a BSc degree in government and public administration from the Abia State University, Uturu, an MBA in shipping and logistics from Lloyds Maritime Academy London, and an honorary doctorate degree in public administration from Commonwealth University in Belize.

== Career ==
Ossy was a customs broker, maritime services provider, shipping consultant and importer. His business encompassed all sectors of Nigerian economy. He was a major employer.

He was the treasurer of the Association of Nigerian Licensed Customs Agents (ANLCA), Onne Sea Port Chapter, 2002, its Secretary 2003 – 2008 and Chairman 2008 – 2014. He was the 1st Deputy President of the Aba Chamber of Commerce, Industry, Mines and Agriculture (NACCIMA).

He was president of the Rotary Club of Eziukwu Aba 2007/2008 and assistant governor of Rotary District 9140, 2009/2010. He was a Hall of Fame Silver Card Holder of the Aba Sports Club.

== Political career ==
Ossy Prestige was a member of the All Progressives Grand Alliance (APGA). In 2015, he was elected to the House of Representatives of Nigeria to represent the Aba North/Aba South Federal Constituency of Abia State in the 8th National Assembly. He was re-elected in 2019 to serve a second term in the 9th National Assembly. During his time in office, he served on legislative committees and took part in parliamentary activities.

== Charity ==
Ossy ran two foundations:

- Prestige Ossy Foundation (President)
- The Favoured Initiatives (President)

=== Constituency projects ===
As part of his 2016 constituency project, Ossy distributed "keke-napepe", motorcycles, electric generators, grinding machines, sewing machines, hairdressing dryers etc.

In 2017, Ossy and the Federal Government National Directorate of Employment gave the unemployed young men and women from his Federal Constituency of Aba North and South skills acquisition training. The two-phase training was on Catering/Confectionery, Cosmetology and Basic Business Training (BBT) otherwise known as Entrepreneurship.

== Personal life ==
Prestige married Rotary Ann Precious. They had five children. He was a Christian and member of the Presbyterian Church denomination.

== Death ==
He died on 6 February 2021.
