= Bende federal constituency =

Bende
- constituency for the House of Representatives
- District: Abia North
- State: Abia, Nigeria

Current constituency
- Party: All Progressives Congress
- Member: Benjamin Kalu

Bende is a federal constituency in Abia State, Nigeria. It covers Bende local government areas. Bende is represented by Benjamin Kalu of the All Progressives Congress of Nigeria.
