= Obingwa/Ugwunagbo/Osisioma federal constituency =

Obingwa/Ugwunagbo/Osisioma
- constituency for the House of Representatives
- District: Abia Central
- State: Abia, Nigeria

Current constituency
- Party: Labour Party
- Member: Munachim Alozie

Obingwa/Ugwunagbo/Osisioma is a federal constituency in Abia State, Nigeria. It covers Obingwa, Ugwunagbo and Osisioma Ngwa local government areas in the state. Obingwa/Ugwunagbo/Osisioma is represented by Munachim Alozie of the Labour Party of Nigeria.
