= Amobi Ogah =

House of Reps member from Isiuakwato/Umunneochi federal constituency of Abia state

Member of the House of Representatives of Nigeria from Abia State
- Incumbent
- Assumed office May 29 2023
- President: Bola Tinubu
- Preceded by: Nkeiruka Onyejeocha
- Constituency: Isuikwuato/Umunneochi
- Chairman House Committee on Aviation

Personal details
- Born: June 15, 1980 (age 46)
- Party: Labour Party
- Occupation: Politician

Amobi Godwin Ogah is a Nigerian politician and businessman. He was elected to the 10th National Assembly in the February 25, 2023 House of Representatives election to represent Isuikwuato/Umunneochi federal constituency of Abia state on the ticket of Labour Party, LP.

== Political career ==
His elder brother Uche Ogah was a Minister of State for Mines and Steel Development in the APC led federal government. Ogah ran for the House of Reps seat in 2019 on the ticket of People's Democratic Party, PDP but lost to long term holder of the seat, Nkeiruka Onyejiocha who had a year earlier left the PDP and Joined APC. In the 2023 House of Representatives election, Ogah ran on the ticket of LP and polled 11,769 votes to defeat Onyejiocha of the APC who scored 8,725 votes. Ogah's win over Onyejiocha the incumbent who was elected to the seat for the 6th to 9th Assembly (2007 to 2023) was one of the major political upsets attributed to the 'effect of Peter Obi' the LP presidential candidate.
