= Isuikwuato/Umunneochi federal constituency =

Isuikwuato/Umunneochi
- constituency for the House of Representatives
- District: Abia North
- State: Abia, Nigeria

Current constituency
- Party: Labour Party
- Member: Amobi Ogah

Isuikwuato/Umunneochi is a federal constituency in Abia State, Nigeria. It covers Isuikwuato and Umunneochi local government areas. Isuikwuato/Umunneochi is represented by Amobi Ogah of the Labour Party of Nigeria.
