= Emeka Nnamani (politician) =

House of Reps member from Aba North/South Federal Constituency of Abia State

Emeka Nnamani is a Nigerian businessman and politician. He was a member of the Federal House of Representatives from Aba North/ Aba South Federal Constituency of Abia State in the 10th National Assembly. He was succeeded by Alex Mascot Ikwechegh after he lost the election petition.

== Political career ==
Nnamani, a member of Labour Party, LP won the 23 February 2023 House of Representatives election with 35,502 votes to defeat two other major opponents, Alex Ikwecheghi of All Progressives Grand Alliance, APGA who scored 22,465 votes, while the incumbent member of House of Representative, Chimaobi Ebisike, of the People's Democratic Party, PDP scored 13,388 votes. The APGA candidate, Alex Ikwecheghi is challenging the results of the election at 2023 Elections Petitions Tribunal. He lost the petition at the elections tribunal and was replaced by Alex Ikwechegh of the All Progressives Grand Alliance.
