= Ifeanyi Uchendu =

Nigerian politician

Ifeanyi Uchendu is a Nigerian politician and a former deputy speaker of the Abia State House of Assembly.
