= Mao Ohuabunwa =

Nigerian politician

National Senator
- In office May 2015 – May 2019
- Preceded by: Uche Chukwumerije
- Succeeded by: Orji Uzor Kalu
- Constituency: Abia North

Personal details
- Born: Mao Arukwe Ohuabunwa; 24 May 1957 (age 69) Port Harcourt, Rivers State
- Party: Peoples Democratic Party (PDP)
- Education: Rivers State University

Mao Arukwe Ohuabunwa // (born 24 May 1957) is a Nigerian politician, businessman and a former Senator who represented Abia North Senatorial District in the 8th National Assembly having served in the 4th and 5th National Assembly as Member representing Arochukwu/Ohafia constituency of Abia State under the Peoples Democratic Party between 1999 and 2007. Truly, he has been able to make a mark on the political landscape of his constituency in particular and in Nigeria. Pitching his camp with the UNCP in 1997, he contested for and was elected as a member of the House of Representatives in 1998, but the electoral process was truncated. However, his passion for public service made him to contest for the same position as a member of the PDP in 1999 which he also won. Responsive and dedicated, he became the Deputy House Leader of the lower chamber and he was also elected as the leader of the South East caucus in the National Assembly. During his stay in the House of Representatives from 1999 to 2007, the dynamic lawmaker who was one of the strong voices in the parliament sponsored many bills which were passed into laws. Respected by his peers for his sincerity and commitment to nation- building, he was nominated into the ECOWAS Parliament where he served as the Chairman for Foreign Affairs Defence and Security of the Sub regional parliament from 2001 to 2003 and was the later Treasurer of the ECOWAS Parliament from 2004 to 2007 and was also Chairman of NEPAD from 2015 to 2019.

== Early life and education ==
Mao Arukwe Ohuabunwa was born in Port Harcourt, Rivers State on 24 May 1957 to parents who were business people from Atani a town in Arochukwu local government area of Abia State. He attended Oro-evo State School where he completed his primary education and Enitona High School, Borokiri where he completed his senior school education. He went on to obtain an HND and BTech in Applied Biology and Microbiology respectively from Rivers State University of Science and Technology. He also went on to attend Enugu State University of Science and Technology where he obtained his PGD and MSc certificates in Public Administration and Human Resources Management respectively. He later went to the prestigious University of Nigeria Nsukka for his Doctoral programme where he obtained a PhD in Political Science.

== Politics ==
In 1998, having made a huge success in his business over the years he then ventured into politics, Senator Mao ran for a seat in the Nigerian House of Representatives under the umbrella of the United Nigeria Congress Party and won, before the process was truncated.

He became the first person to represent both Arochukwu/Ohafia constituency when he yet again contested and won in the 1999 elections this time under the umbrella of the People's Democratic Party and was subsequently elected the Deputy Leader of the House of Representatives. He went on to contest for a seat to represent Abia North in the Nigerian Senate in the 2015 general election which he won and also won the March 6, 2016 re-run after the Appeal Court annulled his earlier victory.

Senator Mao Ohuabunwa is the Pro-Chancellor and Chairman of the 17th Governing Council of the University of Port Harcourt, an appointment he has held since July 2024. He holds the National Productivity Order of Merit award (NPOM), the Distinguished Service Star of Rivers State (DSSRS) and also is a Knight of Saint Christopher of the Anglican Communion (KSC). He is a Fellow of the Nigerian Institute of Science Laboratory Technology (FNISLT)and also the National Animal Production Research Institute (FNAPRI). He holds several traditional titles including the Onu Nekwuru Oha Ndigbo.

== Personal life ==
Ohuabunwa was a House Captain of Anna House as well as the President of both the Debating Club and the Students’ Christian Movement. He was also an athlete, representing his school at various competitions. Senator Mao did his compulsory National Youth Service Corps (NYSC) in the then Gongola State where he rendered service as a lecturer at the Federal Polytechnic, Yola. Renowned for his commitment to achievement of set goals, he was retained by the institution, but Ohuabunwa could only stay in the academic world for a short period before he left to establish and manage the first private diagnostic laboratory centre in Yola, the capital of the then Gongola state known as St. Masunn Medical Laboratories Ltd. He later established Manlab Equipment Limited, which functioned as the importation and distribution arm of his business. Apart from being a landmark business venture in Yola, these firms launched him into the world of scientific entrepreneurship. Apart from his commitment to making a success of his business, Ohuabunwa, who had also worked at the medical laboratories of the General Hospital, Port Harcourt and at the Shell Petroleum Development Company Medicals also in Port Harcourt, served as the Public Relations Officer of then Gongola State Chambers of Commerce, Industry, Mines and Agriculture and was also the first PRO of the Anglican Communion, Yola Diocese.

Mao was married to Lady Barr. Nimi Faith Ohuabunwa with whom he has children. She died on 22 July 2023. Mao is the younger brother to Mazi Sam Ohuabunwa.

== See also ==
- Nigerian National Assembly delegation from Abia
