= Samuel Onuigbo =

Nigerian politician

Hon. Samuel Onuigbo
- Born: October 1, 1960 (age 66); Umuahia
- Education: University of Lagos, Alvan Ikoku College of Education, Enugu State University of Science and Technology, John F Kennedy School of Government, Harvard University.
- Occupations: Administrator; Politician
- Title: Knight of John Wesley, Ebubedike I of the Otu Uzo Autonomous Community and Odozi Obodo Gburugburu of the Ugwu-Ibere Ancient Kingdom
- Political party: All Progressives Congress
- Spouse(s): Pastor Dame Princess Chinyere Onuigbo JP, KJW

Samuel Onuigbo is a Nigerian politician. He was a member of the House of Representatives of Nigeria where he represented Ikwuano/Umuahia North and South Federal Constituency. He is a member of the All Progressives Congress (APC). He served as Chairman of the committee of Climate change in the House of Representatives of Nigeria during the 8th Assembly.

== Education and career ==
Onuigbo schooled at the Alvan Ikoku College of Education, and holds a Master's Degree in Business Administration from the Enugu State University of Science and Technology, a Diploma in Law from the University of Lagos, and a certificate from an Executive Education Programme on Leadership at the John F Kennedy School of Government, Harvard University, USA.

He was a staff of the United States Embassy (now U.S Consulate-General), Lagos, for about eighteen years, rising to the position of Supervisory Fraud Prevention Specialist, before he resigned to join politics. He served as Chairman of the committee of Climate change in the House of Representatives of Nigeria during the 8th Assembly.

=== Political career ===
Onuigbo served as the Special Adviser on Public Affairs to the Speaker of the 6th House of Representatives; Commissioner for Lands and Survey Abia State; and Commissioner for Finance, Abia State

From 2015- 2023, he served as Member representing Ikwuano/Umuahia North/Umuahia South Federal Constituency at the House of Representatives. During the 2023 General Elections, he was the candidate of the All Progressives Congress for the Abia Central Senatorial District election.

He is currently Member (South-East), Governing Board, and Chairman Committee on Security, Climate Change and Special Interventions, North-East Development Commission.

=== Climate change activism ===
During the 8th Assembly, and as Chairman of the House Committee on Climate Change, Sam Onuigbo sponsored Nigeria's Climate Change Bill. Even though the Bill was passed by both the House of Representatives and the Senate, it was denied assent by President Muhammadu Buhari GCFR. He re-sponsored the Bill during the 9th Assembly, addressing all the areas of conflict and expanding its scope in line with current needs. The Bill was signed into law by President Muhammadu Buhari in November, 2021.

In 2019, he was elected to the Board of Global Legislators for a Balanced Environment International as the Vice-President Africa.

== Awards and honours ==
Onuigbo is a recipient of several meritorious honours awards from the US Department of State. In 2023, he was inducted into the National Assembly Most Valuable Parliamentarian Hall of Fame Class of 2019-2023 for his remarkable and impactful performance during the 9th Assembly. He was one of five National Assembly Members out of 469 lawmakers so recognised. In recognition of his contributions to climate action across Africa and around the world, he was honoured as one of 30 Global Leaders on Climate Change for Business Insider's Second Annual Climate Action 30 List.
