= Alex Mascot Ikwechegh =

Nigerian politician, businessman and philanthropist

- Born: Alex Ifeanyi Mascot Ikwechegh; Igbere, Bende Local Government Area, Abia State, Nigeria
- Occupations: Politician; businessman; philanthropist

Alex Ifeanyi Mascot Ikwechegh is Nigerian politician and businessman. He is also a former Local Government Chairman of Aba North, Abia State, Nigeria.He is the Federal House of Representatives from Aba North/ Aba South Federal Constituency of Abia State in the 10th National Assembly.

== Early life and education ==
Ikwechegh is from Igbere, Bende Local Government Area, Abia State, Nigeria. He started his education at Constitution Crescent Primary School, Abia State, before moving to Hope Waddell Training Institution for his secondary education. He then went to University of Calabar where he graduated with a degree in business management.

== Career ==
Ikwechegh started his career as a politician by contesting successfully for the chairmanship of Aba North Local Government, Abia State, Nigeria. At age 28, he became the youngest politically elected chairman of a local government in Nigeria. Ikwechegh started GrossField Group as a construction, real estate, oil and gas company. Later in his career, he started Alex Ikwechegh Foundation providing educational support and relief materials for the less privileged and victims of social, artificial and natural disasters in Nigeria.

Ikwechegh received a chieftaincy title as Nkuma Dike Igbo Amaghi by Eze Igbo Ikeja, Lagos State, Nigeria. In 2018, he received the Ndigbo Times Merit Award.

In October 2024, Ikwechegh was arrested by the Nigerian police for allegedly assaulting a Bolt driver in Abuja while refusing to pay for a delivery service. He was caught on record saying he could make the "man disappear from the whole of Nigeria and nothing would happen". Following extensive public criticism, Ikwechegh apologised for his actions and said that he had reached a "respectful resolution" with the driver. The House of Representatives opened an ethics investigation into the incident.

== Personal life ==
Ikwechegh was born and raised in Igbere, Abia State, Nigeria. His father was Mascot Ukandu Ikwechegh, a businessman and philanthropist. His mother was Eunice Uzaru Ikwechegh.
