= Nkeiruka Onyejeocha =

Nigerian politician

Minister of State for Labour and Employment
- Incumbent
- Assumed office 2023
- President: Bola Tinubu
- Preceded by: Festus Keyamo

Member of the House of Representatives of Nigeria from Abia State
- In office June 2007 – May 29, 2023
- President: Muhammadu Buhari
- Chairman House Committee on Aviation
- Succeeded by: Amobi Ogah
- Constituency: Isuikwuato/Umunneochi

Commissioner for Resource Management and Manpower Development, Abia State
- In office 2002–2007
- President: Olusegun Obasanjo
- Governor: Orji Uzor Kalu

Personal details
- Born: 23 November 1969 (age 56) Isuochi, Umunneochi local government area, Abia State
- Party: All Progressives Congress
- Education: University of Nigeria, Nsukka

Nkeiruka Chidubem Onyejocha // (born 23 November 1969) is a Nigerian politician, current Minister of State for Labour and Employment (2023–Present) and a former lawmaker in Nigeria's Federal House of Representatives. She represented Isuikwuato/Umunneochi Federal Constituency of Abia State. She has sponsored several bills and moved motions that have improved the lives of ordinary citizens and help safeguard their rights.

In 2017 she sponsored a bill that makes emergency treatment of victims of gunshot obligatory and compulsory for hospitals without demanding or delaying treatment to first obtain police reports before commencing treatment in emergency situations.

Onyejocha was first elected in 2007 on the platform of Peoples Democratic Party, PDP then Nigeria's ruling party. She defected to All Progressives Congress, APC in 2018 after coming under intense pressure from her former party leaders to drop her ambition for a return ticket to the house. In 2019, she won her re-election bid for a fourth term in the Nigeria's Green Chamber. She is one of the longest serving members of the house.

In 2019, Onyejocha contested for the position of speaker of the male dominated Nigeria's Federal House of Representatives against Femi Gbajabiamila from Lagos State nominated for the position by their party - All Progressives Congress, APC. Onyejocha major campaign issue was to zone speakership position to her region – south-east of Nigeria for balanced distribution of key federal powers among the six geo-political zones of the country. But she stepped down less than 24 hours to the election.

Onyejocha was previously Executive Transition Chairman of Umunneochi Local Government Area of Abia State in 2002. In 2003 she served in the executive cabinet of Abia State as commissioner for Resource Management and Manpower Development.

== Early life, education and career ==
Onyejocha was born to Eze Bob Ogbonna in Isuochi in Umunneochi local government area of Abia State. She lost her mother at a tender age. Onyejocha attended Isuochi Central Primary School and Ovim Girls School, Isuochi. In 1988 she graduated from University of Nigeria, Nsukka, UNN with a diploma in Social Work/Community Development. In 1993 she finished a Bachelor of Art Degree, BA with second class upper division (Honor) from University of Nigeria, Nsukka. Onyejocha holds master's degree in International Affairs and Diplomacy from Imo State University (2005) and master's degree in Shipping from Ladoke Akintola University of Technology, Oyo State.

In her days as under graduate in the university, Onyejocha was active in student unionism and politics. She held various chairmanship assignments in the students' union government of the University of Nigeria, Nnsuka, UNN. Onyejocha worked in the protocol office of the governor of State of Osun during her one-year Nigeria National Youth Service in 1993. Her interest in politics is said to have been awaken from here.

She was managing director of Nikkings and Kingzol International Ltd that deals in baby and household items. Her leadership was credited for propelling the company to an international business profile. The company was owned by her husband, Sir Kingsley Onyejocha.

== Political career ==
=== Local Government Chairman and Commissioner ===
Onyejocha political career started with her appointment in 2002 to the executive cabinet of Abia State as commissioner for Resource Management and Manpower Development by Governor Orji Uzor Kalu. She is recognised for the establishment of skill acquisition centres across Abia state. In 2003 she was Transition Executive Chairman of Umunneochi Local Government Area of Abia State. During her term in office, she executed erosion control projects, improved community security, and carried out rehabilitation of feeder roads. In appreciation of her work, the Traditional Rulers Council Umunneochi conferred on her a chieftaincy title of Adaejiagamba- (ambassadorial daughter). She was the first to receive the title.

=== Election to Nigeria's Federal House of Representatives ===
Onyejocha was first elected to the Nigeria's Federal House of Representatives in 2007 on the platform of People's Democratic Party, PDP. Her legislative objectives focus on enactment of laws to enhance living standard of women and children; the youth and the less privilege; improvement of education, health and general infrastructure.

During the 7th assembly she was awarded the most vibrant female legislator in Nigeria by Parliamentary Staff Association of Nigeria (PASSAN). Onyejocha was the pioneer Chairman of Women in Parliament committee that was created during the 6th assembly between 2007 and 2011. She led female legislators in efforts in tackling gender inequality and improving the living conditions of children and the less fortunate people.

In 2011 she was appointed chairman house committee on aviation that was at the time grappling with safety issues. Her oversight assignments led to upgrade of Nigerian airports to international standard. Her aviation committee was uncompromising and diligent in its assignment that it became a reference to other committees of the house. In 2013 she called for holistic investigation and prosecution of officials, who were involved in compromising aviation safety rules that led to the crash of a passenger plane Dana Air Flight 992 on a domestic route from Nigeria's capital Abuja to Lagos on 3 June 2012. All 153 people on board and 6 persons on the ground died.

In 2013 Onyejocha placed national interest over regional sentiment when she called for the probe of Stella Oduah, aviation minister who was enmeshed in corruption allegation after she reportedly purchased two BMW cars valued at 250 million naira for the aviation ministry without approval. Onyejocha was publicly criticized by her kinsmen for openly calling for the probe of Stella Oduah.

=== Committee assignments ===
Chairman House Committee on Aviation

Chairman Women in Parliament

Member House Committee, Navy

Member House Committee, Petroleum (Up Stream)

Member House Committee, Nigeria's Federal Capital Territory, FCT

Member committee on House Services/Welfare

Member House committee on Public Procurement.

Member committee on INEC

Member committee on police affairs

== Race for speaker ==
In 2019 Onyejocha ran for the speaker of 9th assembly of the Nigeria Federal House of Representatives after winning a return ticket to the house for a fourth term. She was the only female candidate in the race. With her experience as a ranking member of the house, Onyejocha was a front runner candidate with huge supports from her zone – the south-east of the country being the only candidate running for the position from the region.

Onyejocha campaign was also boosted by supports from various civil society groups especially of women across the country who clamoured for a female speaker for gender equity.

Onyejocha major campaign issues in the speakership race were tied to two points. First was for a south-eastern person to occupy the speakership position against south-west it was zoned to by the party leaders for balance of federal powers among the six regions of Nigeria. The south-east - a key component of the Nigeria federation did not occupy any of the high five political offices. The second point of her campaign issues was "to improve the legislative framework for inclusive growth and social justice in Nigeria, especially for a marginalised group like poor women and the youth, who have been clamouring for more participation in the Nigerian economy and the state of affairs in recent times".

In the heat of the campaign, Onyejocha repeatedly called on her main challenger Femi Gbajabiamila favoured to take the speakership position by their party to back out of the race and support her campaign. But Onyejocha instead stepped down for her main challenger less than 24 hours to the inauguration and election of the speaker of the house. Her resignation from the race was to allow the interest of the party to supersede and prevail individual interests. Onyejocha is known as a loyal party member.

== Bills sponsored ==
=== Compulsory Treatment and Care for Victims of Gunshot Act 2017 ===
The law was to help victims of gunshots receive immediate treatment in hospitals across Nigeria without police report that was a requirement and had always delayed emergency treatment of gunshot victims leading to the untimely death of innocent citizens.

The Bill was passed by the Nigeria National assembly on 14 November 2017 and was signed into law on 20 December 2017 by President Muhamadu Buhari.

Section 1 of the law states that:

As from the commencement of this Act, every hospital in Nigeria whether public or private shall accept or receive, for immediate and adequate treatment with or without police clearance, any person with a gunshot wound.

Section 11 provides that:

Any person or authority including any police officer, other security agent or hospital who stands by and fails to perform his duty under this Act which results in the unnecessary death of any person with gunshot wounds commits an offence and is liable on conviction to a fine of N500,000.00 or imprisonment for a term of five years or both.

=== Anti-torture Act 2017 ===
This Act makes comprehensive provisions for penalising the acts of torture and other cruel, inhuman and degrading treatment or punishment, and prescribes penalties for the commission of such acts. The bill was passed by the National Assembly of the Federal Republic of Nigeria on 14 November 2017 and became law on 20 December 2017 after President Muhammadu Buhari signed it into law.

=== National Senior Citizens Centre Act, 2018 ===
The older persons law came with the promise of a new dawn for Nigeria's 9.6 million elderly citizens, who are aged 60 and above.

Nigeria senior citizens face numerous challenges, but chief among them is the difficulty in getting their entitlements, after years of service to the nation, at a time they are no longer fit to fend adequately for themselves. Essentially, the intention of Onyejocha was to ameliorate the sufferings of aged people. President Muhammadu Buhari signed it into law 26 January 2018.

=== Local Government financial autonomy ===
Constitution of the Federal Republic of Nigeria, (Fourth Alteration) Bill, No. 5, 2017 (Distributable Pool Account): The bill was approved by both chambers of the national assembly but awaiting approval of state houses of assembly.
