= Munachim Alozie =

Nigerian politician

Federal Representative
- Constituency: Obingwa/Osisioma/Ugwunagbo

Personal details
- Born: April 14, 1961 (age 65)
- Occupation: Politician

Munachim Ikechi Alozie (born April 14, 1961) is a Nigerian politician and a member of the Federal House of Representatives from Obingwa/Osisioma/Ugwunagbo federal constituency of Abia State in the 10th National Assembly.

== Early life ==
Alozie was born on April 14, 1961 at Umuchima Akanu Ngwa of Ugwunagbo Local Government Area of Abia State. He attended the Akanu Ngwa Primary School, Secondary Technical School, Obegu, and the College of Agriculture (now Imo State Polytechnic) Umuagwo.

== Political career ==
Alozie's political career began as the Executive Chairman of Ugwunagbo Local Government Area from 1997 to 1998, and he later served as Transition Committee Chairman from 2011 to 2012. He was Deputy National Chairman of the Association of Local Governments of Nigeria (ALGON) from 1997 to 1998. In the People's Democratic Party (PDP), he held roles as Abia South Deputy Chairman and State Financial Secretary. In the Nigerian House of Representatives, he chaired the Committee on Recovery of Public Funds and served on various other committees.

Alozie was a two-term member of the Abia State House of Assembly representing Ugwunagbo State Constituency from 2015 to 2023. He was Majority Chief Whip of the house. He resigned from this position in 2022 following his resignation from PDP to join Labour Party, LP. He ran for the Obingwa/Osisioma/Ugwunagbo Federal Constituency on the ticket of LP in the February 2023 House of Representatives election and won.
