= Benjamin Kalu =

Nigerian politician

The Honourable Benjamin Kalu CFR
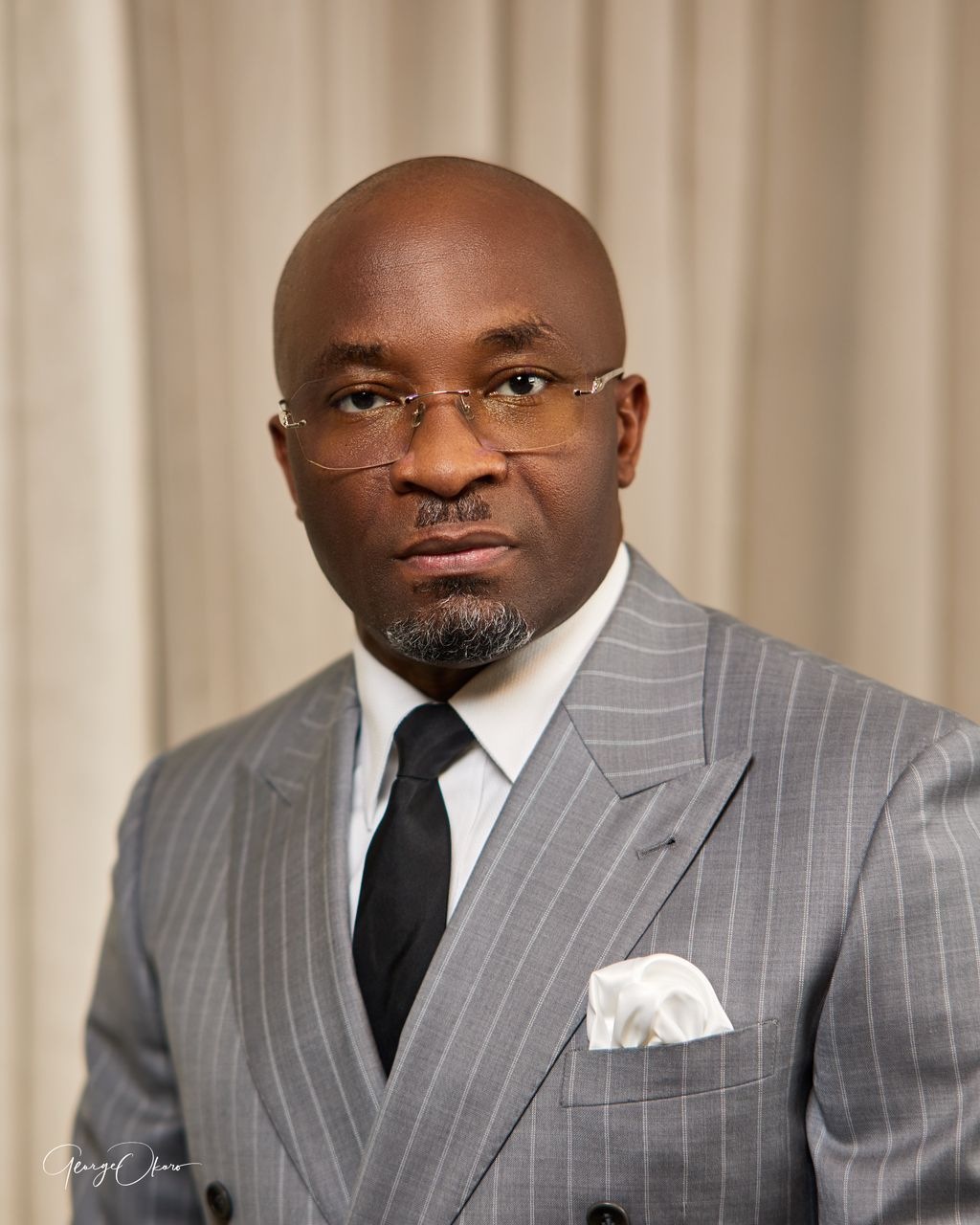

Deputy Speaker of the House of Representatives of Nigeria
- Incumbent
- Assumed office 13 June 2023
- Speaker: Tajudeen Abbas
- Preceded by: Ahmed Idris Wase

Member of the House of Representatives of Nigeria from Abia
- Incumbent
- Assumed office 11 June 2019
- Constituency: Bende

Personal details
- Party: All Progressives Congress
- Other political affiliations: Peoples Democratic Party; Progressive Peoples Alliance
- Occupation: Politician

Benjamin Okezie Kalu CFR is a Nigerian politician who is currently serving as the deputy speaker of the House of Representatives of Nigeria since 2023. He represents the Bende federal constituency.

== Early life and education ==
Benjamin Okezie Kalu was born on 5 May 1971 in Agbamuzu, Bende Local Government Area of Abia State, Nigeria. He holds multiple degrees, including a Master of Business Administration from Oxford Brookes University, a Master of Law in terrorism and international humanitarian law (distinction), and a Bachelor of Law (LL.B Hons.) from the University of Calabar. Kalu was called to the Nigerian Bar after completing his studies at the Nigeria Law School in Enugu State, Nigeria. In 2025, he earned a Doctor of Philosophy (Ph.D) in public policy and strategic studies from University of Abuja with thesis titled Government Capacity to Integrate International Climate Adapta-tion Strategies and Policies in Nigeria. In April 2026, he bagged another Doctor of Philosophy (Ph.D)in Laws from the University of Calabar with thesis titled "Evaluating the Efficacy of Anti-Terrorism Legislation in Nigeria: Human Rights Challenges and Lessons for Emerging Democracies"

In addition to his formal education, Kalu has obtained several certifications in Migration and Human Rights from John Cabot University, Italy, Illicit Trade from the University of Groningen, Netherlands, Governance and Development from Miami Herbert Business School, Miami University, USA, Environmental Crimes from the United Nations Interregional Crime and Justice Research Institute (UNICRI), Italy and International Commercial Arbitration from the Chartered Institute of Arbitrators (CIARB) at the University of Oxford, United Kingdom.

== Political career ==
Kalu's political career began in 2002 when he contested for the House of Representatives primaries. He served as the Local Government Chairman (Transition) for Bende Local Government Area, Abia State and held various advisory roles to the then Governor of Abia State, Orji Uzor Kalu. He has also served as the National Chapter President of the Peoples Democracy Party in Diaspora, the youngest Local Government Chairman of Bende Local Government Area, and Senior Special Adviser to Theodore Orji on Local Government and Chieftaincy Affairs in Abia State, Nigeria.

He was re-elected in 2023 and he is currently the deputy speaker of the House of Representatives of Nigeria. His roles in the 10th Assembly include chairman of the Constitution Review and Amendment Committee.

=== Legislative activities ===
As the spokesperson of the 9th Assembly, Kalu proposed and supported various bills, motions, and acts, including the Acts Authentication Act, and the Nigerian Communications Act. He currently serves as Chairman of the House Committee on the review of the 1999 Nigerian Constitution.

== Projects ==
Kalu is the convener of the Peace in the South East Project (PISE), which aims to use non-kinetic means to resolve insecurity in the South East Region of Nigeria. He also led the Sudan Darfur Project in Australia for the United Nations High Commission for Refugees, focusing on fundraising and providing orientation for refugees.

He is also the founder of the Benjamin Kalu Foundation.

== Personal life ==
Kalu is married and has five children.

== Awards and recognition ==
- Valuable Parliamentarian by OrderPaper
- Outstanding Representative Member of the Year at the Democracy Heroes Award Africa
- 2021 Zik's Award of Excellence on Civic Engagement
- South East and Abia State Federal Lawmaker of the Year Award by Independent Newspaper
- Outstanding Legislative Contribution Award towards Improving Tuberculosis policy and Funding in Nigeria
- Leadership Excellence (LEEX) Awards
- 2019 Humanitarian Service Award
- FLO FM Icon Award as the Most Impactful Lawmaker of the Year
- Model of Media and Public Relation Matters Award

== Membership ==
- Member and International Rappoteur of the Inter-Parliamentary Union
- Member of the Steering Committee of the Parliamentary Conference on the World Trade Organisation (PCWTO)
- Member of the African Union Pan African Parliament, serving under the Finance and Admin Committee
- Member of the ECOWAS Parliament, serving as the chairman of the Finance, Administration and Budget Committee
- Fellow of OSHAssociation United Kingdom
- Fellow of the Chartered Institute of International Arbitrators (CIARB UK)
- Member of the Nigerian Bar Association (NBA)
- Fellow of the Institute of Administrative Managers (F.Inst.AM)
- Honorary Fellow of the Nigerian Institute of Public Service (FNIPR)
- Fellow of the International Scientific Community of the School of International Economic Relations and Travel Business

== Publications ==
- Kalu, Benjamin & Miebaka, Nabiebu (2024). The International Criminal Court: Analyzing Its Efficacy in Combating International Crimes in the 21st Century. Advances in Law, Pedagogy, and Multidisciplinary Humanities, 2(1), 85-104.
- Benjamin Okezie Kalu & Amarachukwu Onyinyechi Ijiomah (2024). The Evolution and Impact of Terrorism in Africa: Historical Context, Key Actors, and Counter-Terrorism Measures, PINISI Journal of Art, Humanity and Social Studies, Vol. 4 (1), E-ISSN 2747-2671.
- Benjamin Okezie Kalu and Ugonna Obi-Emeruwa (2024). Climate Adaptation Policy and Food Security in Nigeria: Evaluating Strategies, Challenges and Future Directions, Journal of African Gender, Peace and Security Studies Review, Vol. 3, No. 1, ISSN 0189-7934.
- Kalu, Benjamin Okezie & Miebaka, Nabiebu (2024). The International Criminal Court: Analyzing Its Efficacy in Combating International Crimes in the 21st Century. Advances in Law, Pedagogy, and Multidisciplinary Humanities, 2(1), 85-104.
- Ugonna Obi-Emeruwa, Benjamin Okezie Kalu, Oyindamola Kolapo (2024). Need for Africanization of Militaries in Africa, Journal of African Gender, Peace and Security Studies Review, Vol. 2, No. 1, ISSN 0189-7934.
- Kalu, Benjamin Okezie & Ijiomah, Amarachi (2024). Rethinking Islamophobia: A Transnational Crisis of Identity for the Potential Terrorist. Advances in Law, Pedagogy, and Multidisciplinary Humanities, 2(2), 1-23.
- Benjamin Okezie Kalu and Amarachukwu Onyinyechi Ijioma (2024). The Impact of Foreign Direct Investment (FDI) on Economic Growth and Development in Nigeria: Prospects, Challenges, and Policy Implications, GNOSI: An Interdisciplinary Journal of Human Theory and Praxis. Volume 7, Issue 2, July–December 2024 ISSN (Online): 2714-2485.
- Kalu, Benjamin Okezie & Ijioma, Amarachi Onyinyechi (2024). International Legal Regime: Analysis of Cases Relating to Global Terrorism. GNOSI: An Interdisciplinary Journal of Human Theory and Praxis, 7(1), 246-245.
