= Chimaobi Ebisike =

Nigerian politician

Chimaobi Ebisike is a Nigerian politician, member of the 9th Federal House of Representatives in from Aba North/ Aba South Federal Constituency of Abia State.

== Political career ==
Ebisike served as commissioner for special duties in the government of Governor Okezie Ikpeazu of Abia State from 2019 to 2021. He contested in the bye-election for Aba North/ Aba South Federal Constituency on the ticket of People's Democratic Party, PDP following the death of Ossy Prestige the member representing the constituency in 2021. Ebisike polled 10,322 votes to beat the candidates of All Progress Congress, APC, Mascot Uzor Kalu who scored 3,674 and All Progressives Grand Alliance, APGA, Akaraka Destiny Nwagwu who polled 1,554 votes.

Ebisike ran for a return ticket to the 10th House of Representatives in the February 25, 2023 elections on same party (PDP) ticket but lost. He was defeated by the candidate of the Labour Party, LP Emeka Nnamani who polled 35,502 votes while the incumbent Ebisike scored 13,388 votes to place distant third position behind the candidate of All Progressives Grand Alliance, APGA Alex Ikwecheghi who polled 22,465 votes to place second in the election.
