= Darlington Nwokocha =

Nigerian politician (born 1967)

Rt. Hon Darlington Nwokocha

Senator for Abia Central
- In office 13 June 2023 – 4 November 2023
- Preceded by: Theodore Orji
- Succeeded by: Austin Akobundu

Member of the House of Representatives of Nigeria from Abia
- In office 9 June 2015 – 11 June 2023
- Succeeded by: Ginger Onwusibe
- Constituency: Isiala Ngwa North/Isiala-Ngwa South

Member of the Abia State House of Assembly
- In office June 2007 – June 2015
- Constituency: Isiala Ngwa North

Personal details
- Born: 16 August 1967 (age 59)
- Party: Labour Party (2023—present)
- Other political affiliations: Peoples Democratic Party (before 2023)
- Occupation: Politician

Darlington Nwokocha (born 16 August 1967) is a Nigerian politician who served as the senator representing Abia Central senatorial district from June to November 2023. Before his election to the Senate, he was a member of the House of Representatives, representing Isiala-Ngwa North/Isiala-Ngwa South from 2015 to 2019. He served as the chairman on Insurance and Actuarial Matters during his time in the House. Nwokocha was a member of the Abia State House of Assembly from 2007 to 2015. His term in the senate was short-lived as a result of his election being nullified by the Court of Appeal of Nigeria.

== Early life and education ==
Nwokocha (born 16 August 1967) is a native of Isiala Ngwa in Abia State, Nigeria. He received his primary and secondary education in Abia State before enrolling at the University of Calabar, where he obtained a bachelor's degree. He earned a master's degree in Environmental Pollution and Control and a Doctor of Philosophy (Ph.D.) in Environmental Management from the same university.

== Political career ==
Nwokocha began his political career in Abia State, where he served as chairman of Isiala Ngwa South Local Government Area.

He was elected to the House of Representatives in the 2019 Nigerian general election to represent the Isiala Ngwa North/Isiala Ngwa South Federal Constituency of Abia State on the platform of the People's Democratic Party (PDP). He served as a member of the 9th National Assembly from 2019 to 2023.

In the 2023 Nigerian Senate election, Nwokocha was elected to the Nigerian Senate to represent Abia Central Senatorial District under the Labour Party.

== Removal from Senate ==
On 4 November 2023, the Appeal Court of Nigeria sitting in Lagos, nullified Senator Darlington Nwokocha's election victory. He had previously won at a lower tribunal but the judgment was appealed by his challenger Col Austin Akobundu (retd) leading to his removal from the Senate. He is replaced by Col. Austin Akobundu who won his petition at the Court of Appeal.
