= Nigerian senators of the 4th National Assembly =

Senators of the 4th National Assembly of Nigeria

The table below lists Nigerian senators of the 4th National Assembly. The 4th National Assembly (1999–2003) was inaugurated on 29 May 1999 at the start of the Nigerian Fourth Republic. The Senate includes three senators from each of the 36 states, plus one minister for the Federal Capital Territory, Abuja. Evan Enwerem was appointed president of the Senate, until he was removed from office on 18 November 1999, replaced by Chuba Okadigbo. Okadigbo was impeached on 8 August 2000 and was replaced by Pius Anyim.

== See also ==
- Nigerian Senate

Senator Jim Nwobodo of Enugu East Senatorial Zone, Enugu State was not elected under AD. He was elected unopposed on the platform of the PDP when the previous winner, Uche Nnaji of AD stepped down before the inauguration of the 4th Senate in 1999. The bye election that followed Uche Nnaji's withdrawal paved the way for Jim Nwobodo to be elected unopposed on the platform of The Peoples Democratic Party (PDP). Please correct this for the records.
