= Uko Nkole =

Nigerian politician

Uko Ndukwe Nkole

Member of the House of Representatives of Nigeria

Personal details
- Born: 20 October 1975 (age 50) Abam Onyereubi, Arochukwu, Abia State
- Party: People's Democratic Party (Nigeria) (PDP)
- Occupation: Legislature
- Profession: Registered /Fellow Nigerian Institute Of Town Planners/Politician

Uko Ndukwe Nkole (born 20 October 1975 in Ozu Abam Arochukwu, Abia State) is a Nigerian politician and member of the Nigerian National Assembly. Nkole was the representative from Arochukwu/Ohafia in the Federal House of Representative in the 8th and 9th assemblies. He did not contest for reelection to the House of Assembly in 2023.

== Early life and education ==
Uko Ndukwe Nkole was born on 20 October 1975 to Chief Emmanuel Ndukwe Nkole and Madam Nkole. His father was a senior manager at the Central Bank of Nigeria. Nkole attended both Government College Umuahia and Ovukwu Secondary school, where he received his junior and senior school certificates in 1989 and 1993 respectively. He obtained a bachelor's degree in 1999, in geography at the University of Nigeria, Nsukka. He also received a postgraduate diploma from the Nigerian Town Planning Institute in 2008, an M.Sc. in Environmental Management 2019 University of Nigeria Nsukka, and a PhD in view. Nkole is also an alumnus of RIPA - London and the International Visitors Leadership program of the Department of States United States of America.

== Career ==
Nkole completed his National Youth Service Corp at the Central Bank of Nigeria in Minna, Niger State. He then moved to Abuja, where he was employed by the Federal Capital Territory administration as a town planner in development control. He was elected a member of the Federal House of Representative in 2015 and re-elected in the 2019 general election.
