= 2023 Abia State gubernatorial election =

Election in Abia State, Nigeria

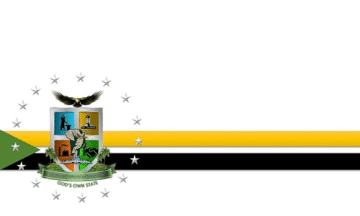
- 18 March 2023
- Opinion polls
- Registered: 2,120,808
Nominee	Alex Otti	Okey Ahiwe	Enyinnaya Nwafor
Party	LP	PDP	YPP
Running mate	Ikechukwu Emetu	Jasper Uche	Chima Anyaso
Popular vote	175,467	88,529	28,972
Nominee	Ikechi Emenike	Gregory Ibe
Party	APC	APGA
Running mate	Gloria Akara	Obinna Ichita
Popular vote	24,091	18,119
Governor before election
Okezie Ikpeazu
PDP
Elected Governor
Alex Otti
LP

The 2023 Abia State gubernatorial election took place on 18 March 2023, to elect the Governor of Abia State, concurrent with elections to the Abia State House of Assembly as well as twenty-seven other gubernatorial elections and elections to all other state houses of assembly. The election, which was postponed from its original 11 March date, was held three weeks after the presidential election and National Assembly elections. Incumbent PDP governor Okezie Ikpeazu was term-limited and could not seek a third term. Alex Otti, a banker, gained the office for the Labour Party by a margin of victory over first runner-up and PDP nominee—Okey Ahiwe, the former chief of staff to Ikpeazu.

Alex Otti won 10 of the 17 local government areas in the state with a total vote of 175,467.

Party primaries were scheduled for between 4 April and 9 June 2022 with the Labour Party nominating Otti on 9 June. For the All Progressives Congress, two separate parallel primaries were held on 26 May with one primary nominating economist Ikechi Emenike and the other primary picking former minister Uche Ogah. INEC initially recognised Emenike as the legitimate nominee in July after a court ruled in his favour but switched recognition to Ogah after his successful November appeal; however, the next month a new court ruling reinstated Emenike as the APC nominee. The All Progressives Grand Alliance nominated educationist Gregory Ibe on 29 May; however, a Federal High Court ruling nullified the primary on 1 December due to irregularities in the primary with a February Court of Appeal ruling barring the party from fielding a nominee. The Peoples Democratic Party nominated professor Uche Ikonne on 25 May but Ikonne died in January 2023, prompting a new primary on 4 February which resulted in the nomination of Ahiwe.

== Electoral system ==
The Governor of Abia State is elected using a modified two-round system. To be elected in the first round, a candidate must receive the plurality of the vote and over 25% of the vote in at least two-thirds of local government areas. If no candidate passes this threshold, a second round will be held.

== Background ==
Abia State is a small, Igbo-majority southeastern state; although it is one of the most developed states in the nation, Abia has faced challenges in security as both the nationwide kidnapping epidemic and separatist violence have heavily affected the region. Originally launched ostensibly to defend ethnic Igbos from herdsmen and government attacks, the separatist organization Indigenous People of Biafra's Eastern Security Network began violently enforcing economically destructive weekly lockdowns in 2021 and swiftly were criticized for committing human rights abuses against civilians it was meant to protect. These atrocities coupled with law enforcement brutality and herder–farmer clashes worsened the security situation prior to the election.

Politically, the 2019 elections were categorized as a solidification of the Abia PDP's control but a slight expansion of the APC on the federal level. Statewise, Ikpeazu won re-election with over 60% of the vote and the vast majority of House of Assembly seats were won by the PDP. On the other hand, while the PDP was still successful federally, it lost ground only winning seven House of Representatives seats and two Senate seats compared to all nine and all three in 2015. For the presidency, Abia was easily won by PDP nominee Atiku Abubakar with about 68% but still swung towards the APC and had strikingly low turnout.

During Ikpeazu's second term, his administration focus included support for small and medium-sized enterprises, water resource management, and infrastructure development; however, he was routinely criticized for lack of action on transportation infrastructure projects. After being accused of abandoning a four-year-long flyover project, Ikpeazu's response of deriding questioners as walkers that "don't have [the] vehicles" to use the uncompleted flyover was widely criticized as arrogant and out-of-touch. At other points during his administration Ikpeazu was criticized for poor waste management, his unfounded initial dismissal of the COVID-19 pandemic in March 2020, and the unilateral sacking of three local government chairman in June 2020 while being praised for expanding access to clean water.

In 2022, Alex Otti declared for governorship under Labour Party, promising to reduce the unemployment rate, tackle insecurity, provide quality education to the state and restore local government's autonomy. In 2023, the Independent National Electoral Commission (INEC) declared him winner of the state's governorship election.

== Primary elections ==
The primaries, along with any potential challenges to primary results, were to take place between 4 April and 3 June 2022 but the deadline was extended to 9 June. An informal zoning gentlemen's agreement and the formal Abia Charter of Equity sets the Abia North Senatorial District to have the next governor as Abia North has not held the governorship since 2007. Within Abia North, the Ohafia clan of the southern part of Abia North has claimed to be next in line for the governorship as the previous Abia North Governor (Orji Uzor Kalu) was from the northern part of Abia North.

However, no major party closed their primaries to either non-Northern or non-Ohafia candidates as the PDP nominated someone from the central district while APGA nominated a northerner.

=== All Progressives Congress ===
The year prior to the APC primaries were beset by party infighting between factions led by Ikechi Emenike and Donatus Nwankpa, culminating in two parallel party congresses in October 2021. Analysts contest that the party crisis had to be resolved if the APC was to be competitive in the general election. Emenike's grouping eventually won out and was recognized by the national party in February 2022 but the party infighting continued until the primary. As primaries neared, Emenike and state party chairman Kingsley Ononogbu stated that the primary would not be zoned and would open to all aspirants.

On 20 April 2022, the APC National Executive Committee announced the party's schedule for gubernatorial primaries, setting its expression of interest form price at ₦10 million and nomination form price at ₦40 million with a 50% nomination form discount for candidates younger than 40 while women and candidates with disabilities get free nomination forms. Forms were to be sold from 26 April to 6 May until the deadline was later extended to 10 May then 12 May. After the submission of nomination forms by 13 May, candidates were screened by a party committee on 14 and 15 May while 16 May was the date for the screening appeal process. Ward congresses and LGA congresses were set for between 7 and 9 May to elect delegates for the primary. Candidates approved by the screening process advanced to a primary set for 26 May, in concurrence with other APC gubernatorial primaries; challenges to the result could be made the next day.

On the primary date, two parallel primaries were held with Emenike's grouping holding an indirect primary at the Chidiebere Arena while the other candidates held a direct primary (citing a national APC directive for a direct primary in Abia) that carried on into the next day. After both primaries were peacefully held, the Chidiebere Arena primary ended in Emenike winning by a wide margin while the direct primary resulted in a victory for former minister Uche Ogah. It was expected that the APC National Working Committee and/or litigation would decide which primary was legitimate but the state party quickly lined up behind Emenike. When Ogah sued to prevent Emenike's recognition, a Court of Appeal sided with Emenike and threw out the lawsuit. In mid-August, Emenike selected Gloria Akara—a Christian minister from Ukwa East LGA—as his running mate. Another lawsuit against Emenike, from Daniel Eke, was dismissed by a High Court in October. The Emenike candidacy was derailed in November when Ogah—who had appealed the previous judgement against him—won his case before a Federal High Court sitting in Abuja, declaring Emenike's nomination invalid and affirming Ogah's nomination. However, the next month, a Court of Appeal ruling overturned that decision and reinstated Emenike as the legitimate nominee.

==== Nominated ====
- Ikechi Emenike: 2019 APC gubernatorial candidate and husband of Ambassador to the United States Uzoma Emenike
  - Running mate—Gloria Akara

==== Eliminated in primary ====
- Uche Ogah: former Minister of State for Mines and Steel Development (2019–2022) and 2019 APC gubernatorial nominee
- Emeka Atuma: former House of Representatives member for Umuahia North/Umuahia South/Ikwuano (2003–2007)
- Daniel Eke: accountant
- Paul Ikonne: Executive Secretary of National Agricultural Land Development Authority (2020–present)
- Obinna Oriaku: former Commissioner for Finance (2015–2019)

==== Withdrew ====
- Michael Kasarachi Enyinna: 2019 APC Ukwa East/Ukwa West House of Representatives candidate (to run for senator for Abia South)
- Alex Otti: 2015 and 2019 APGA gubernatorial nominee (defected prior to the primary to successfully run in the LP gubernatorial primary)

==== Declined ====
- Nnanna Uzor Kalu: former House of Representatives member for Aba North/Aba South (2003–2011) and brother of Senator for Abia North and former Governor Orji Uzor Kalu
- Nkechi Nwaogu: former Senator for Abia Central (2007–2015) and former House of Representatives member for Obingwa/Ugwunagbo/Osisioma (2003–2007)
- Friday Nwosu: 2019 APC gubernatorial candidate and barrister

==== Results ====
Candidates' vote share
1. Ikechi Emenike (75.3%)
2. Emeka Atuma (16.8%)
3. Other candidates (7.85%)

APC Chidiebere Arena primary results
Party	Candidate	Votes	%
APC	Ikechi Emenike	672	75.34%
APC	Emeka Atuma	150	16.81%
APC	Paul Ikonne	22	2.47%
APC	Daniel Eke	16	1.79%
APC	Alex Otti (withdrawn)	14	1.57%
APC	Obinna Oriaku	12	1.35%
APC	Uche Ogah	6	0.67%
Total votes		919	100.00%

Invalid indirect primary results
Candidates' vote share
1. Uche Ogah (72.5%)
2. Paul Ikonne (13.8%)
3. Other candidates (13.7%)

APC direct primary results
Party	Candidate	Votes	%
APC	Uche Ogah	141,952	72.50%
APC	Paul Ikonne	27,054	13.82%
APC	Ikechi Emenike	9,446	4.82%
APC	Emeka Atuma	7,429	3.79%
APC	Obinna Oriaku	5,553	2.84%
APC	Alex Otti (withdrawn)	2,414	1.23%
APC	Daniel Eke	1,953	1.00%
Total votes		195,801	100.00%

=== All Progressives Grand Alliance ===
On 25 March 2022, the national APGA announced its primary schedule, setting its expression of interest form price at ₦3 million and the nomination form price at ₦12 million with a 50% discount for women candidates and candidates with disabilities. Forms were to be sold from 29 March to 11 April but the deadline was extended to 15 April; after the purchase of forms, gubernatorial candidates were screened by a party committee on 22 and 23 April while the screening appeal process was held on 5 May. Ward congresses were set for 10 May to elect delegates for the primary. Candidates approved by the screening process advanced to a primary set for 29 May, in concurrence with all other APGA gubernatorial primaries; challenges to the result could be made on 31 May.

On the primary date, the four candidates contested an indirect primary that ended with Gregory Ibe emerging as the PDP nominee after results showed Ibe winning around 54% of the delegates' votes. In his acceptance speech, Ibe called for his opponents to unify the party but one of them, Ijioma Nwokoro Ijioma, immediately rejected the results. Both of the other opponents later also rejected Ibe's win and separately went to court to challenge the results. In July, Ibe's running mate was announced as Obinna Ichita—a MHA. However, on December 1, Udensi's lawsuit was successful as a Federal High Court ruling annulled the primary and ordered APGA to conduct a new primary within fourteen days. The party stated its intent to appeal the ruling instead of holding a new primary. However, its appeal was dismissed by a Court of Appeal judgment on 8 February 2023 and, since the High Court's fourteen days limit had elapsed, the judgment also barred APGA from fielding a gubernatorial nominee in the election. Ibe rejected the ruling and immediately began to appeal process which led to the reinstatement of Ibe as nominee.

==== Nominated ====
- Gregory Ibe: founder and Chancellor of Gregory University
  - Running mate—Obinna Ichita: House of Assembly member for Aba South

==== Eliminated in primary ====
- Ijioma Nwokoro Ijioma: former Army major general
- Chikwe Udensi: businessman
- Etigwe Uwa: lawyer

==== Results ====
Candidates' vote share
1. Gregory Ibe (54.5%)
2. Etigwe Uwa (36.2%)
3. Ijioma Nwokoro Ijioma (6.94%)
4. Chikwe Udensi (2.31%)

APGA primary results
Party	Candidate	Votes	%
APGA	Gregory Ibe	283	54.53%
APGA	Etigwe Uwa	188	36.22%
APGA	Ijioma Nwokoro Ijioma	36	6.94%
APGA	Chikwe Udensi	12	2.31%
Total votes		519	100.00%

=== People's Democratic Party ===
Ahead of the primary, arguments over zoning starkly divided the state PDP as groups from each senatorial district separately demanded different zoning arrangements with groups from the Southern district attempting to keep the primary open and those from the Central district lobbying for the nomination to be zoned to the centre along with those from the Northern district, whose turn it is based on the previous agreement. Eventually, the party zoned its nomination to both the Northern and Central districts in late March 2022. The decision immediately elevated the intraparty strife as Northern groups protested the inclusion of the Central district in what was termed an "abnormal novelty" meant to allow a central candidate Ikpeazu supported to run. Southern PDP stakeholders also rejected the arrangement with candidate Enyinnaya Abaribe describing it as unjust imposition meant to exclude him from the primary.

Another cause of internal party rifts was Ikpeazu's alleged attempts to impose his preferred candidate upon the party, with opponents accusing him of unduly supporting either optometrist Uche Ikonne or his former aide Chinenye Nwogu. The alleged endorsement of Ikonne caused even greater turmoil as Ikonne is not only from the Central district but is also a member of the Ukwa-Ngwa ethnic subgroup, just like Ikpeazu. While Ukwa-Ngwa bodies dismissed objections to consecutive Ukwa-Ngwa governors and lined up behind Ikonne, other candidates vehemently opposed what was termed subethnic "self-succession."

On 16 March 2022, the national PDP announced its gubernatorial primaries' schedule, setting its expression of interest form price at ₦1 million and the nomination form price at ₦20 million with a 50% discount for candidates between 25 and 30. Forms were to be sold until 1 April but the party later extended the deadline four times before reaching a final deadline of 22 April. After the submission of nomination forms by 25 April, candidates were screened by a party committee on 28 April while 2 May was the rescheduled date for the screening appeal process. Ward congresses were set for 29 April and LGA congresses were rescheduled for 10 May to elect delegates for the primary. Candidates approved by the screening process advanced to a primary set for 25 May, in concurrence with all other PDP gubernatorial primaries; challenges to the result could be made in the following days.

In the days before the primary, the party crisis deepened as several governorship aspirants and other stakeholders rejected the ad hoc delegate list as fabricated and accused bad actors of planning on doctoring the statutory delegate list as well. Analysts noted that if the allegations were proven true, the Abia PDP was risking disqualification by using unelected delegates. When their appeals to the national party for intervention failed, seven candidates withdrew on the date of the primary in protest of its conduct including Abaribe and Oko Chukwu. Ikonne ended up winning the nomination easily with over 80% of the votes cast. However, the fiery primary and party crisis around it caused massive divides within the Abia PDP with Abaribe defecting to APGA the day after the primary. In June, Ikonne selected Okey Igwe—MHA for Umunneochi—as his running mate.

May 2022 primary

==== Nominated in May 2022 primary ====
- Uche Ikonne†: optometrist
  - Running mate—Okey Igwe: House of Assembly member for Umunneochi

==== Eliminated in May 2022 primary ====
- Lucky Igbokwe: businessman
- Ezenwanyi Ngozi Jonah

==== Withdrew from May 2022 primary ====
- Enyinnaya Abaribe: Senator for Abia South (2007–present), Senate Minority Leader (2019–present), 2003 ANPP gubernatorial nominee, and former Deputy Governor (1999–2003) (defected after the primary to APGA to run for re-election as senator for Abia South)
- Chima Anyaso: hotelier
- Onyekwere Akym Uche: founder of the OAU Foundation (defected prior to the primary to successfully run in the AA gubernatorial primary)
- Gregory Ibe: founder and Chancellor of Gregory University (defected prior to the primary to successfully run in the APGA gubernatorial primary)
- Enyinnaya Nwafor: engineer and son of former Deputy Governor Chima Nwafor (defected prior to the primary to successfully run in the YPP gubernatorial primary)
- Emma Nwaka: former Abia State PDP Chairman and former Senator for Abia North (1992–1993)
- Ude Oko Chukwu: Deputy Governor (2015–present) and former House of Assembly member for Ohafia North (2003–2015)
- Ncheta Omerekpe: businessman
- Sampson Orji: former Commissioner for Special Duties (2011–2015), former Commissioner for Commerce (2009–2011), and former House of Assembly member for Arochukwu (1999–2003)

==== Declined to run in May 2022 primary ====
- Chris Odinaka Igwe: Chairman of the Chrisnak Group and managing director of Mainland Oil and Gas Limited
- Chinenye Nwogu: former Ikpeazu aide
- Nnenna Obewo: former Commissioner for Transportation
- Chinedum Enyinnaya Orji: House of Assembly member for Umuahia Central (2015–present), House of Assembly Speaker (2019–present), and son of former Governor Theodore Orji

==== Results of May 2022 primary ====
Candidates' vote share
1. Uche Ikonne (85.6%)
2. Lucky Igbokwe (8.23%)
3. Other candidates (6.21%)

PDP primary results
Party	Candidate	Votes	%
PDP	Uche Ikonne	468	85.56%
PDP	Lucky Igbokwe	45	8.23%
PDP	Ude Oko Chukwu (withdrawn)	6	1.10%
PDP	Enyinnaya Abaribe (withdrawn)	5	0.91%
PDP	Chima Anyaso (withdrawn)	5	0.91%
PDP	Ezenwanyi Ngozi Jonah	5	0.91%
PDP	Enyinnaya Nwafor (withdrawn)	4	0.73%
PDP	Emma Nwaka (withdrawn)	4	0.73%
PDP	Ncheta Omerekpe (withdrawn)	3	0.55%
PDP	Greg Ibe (withdrawn)	2	0.37%
PDP	Other candidates (withdrawn)	0	0.00%
Total votes		547	100.00%
Invalid or blank votes		8	N/A
Turnout		555	Unknown

However, Ikonne's death on 25 January 2023 forced the PDP into a new nomination process less than two months before the election in addition to vacating Igwe's nomination. On 27 January, the state PDP announced the first part of the new gubernatorial primary schedule, with expression of interest and nomination forms being sold until 1 February. The next day, aspirants must present themselves to the State Working Committee at the State Party Secretariat. Pre-primary analysis mainly focused on the losing aspirants from the first primary that had remained in the PDP along with reports that state party leadership had held several meetings about the primary throughout the state. One of these meetings, attended by Ikpeazu and several prospective candidates, resulted in the micro-zoning of the nomination to the Isiala Ngwa North LGA—Ikonne's LGA—on 30 January despite renewed calls for zoning the nomination to the North; candidates from outside of Isiala Ngwa North were allowed to contested though. Pre-primary analysis reviewed the complicated circumstances of the primary but revealed that the party intended on using the controversial delegate list from the May primary along with reports that Ikpeazu and other members of party leadership had decided on Okey Ahiwe—Ikpeazu's Chief of Staff—as their pick for the nomination. On primary day, five candidates contested an indirect primary at the Umuahia Township Stadium resulted in Ahiwe emerging as the PDP nominee after results showed him winning over 93% of the delegates' votes. Later reporting revealed that delegates had been bribed to support Ahiwe and none of the unsuccessful aspirants conceded to Ahiwe after the announcement of results. In the days after the primary, reporting revealed that Ikpeazu planned to drop Ikonne's running mate—Okey Igwe—in favour of Jasper Uche to placate the Theodore Orji-led intraparty bloc. Although Igwe loudly protested the move and claimed that his nomination had not been voided by Ikonne's death, the PDP submitted Uche's name to INEC and he was listed as the deputy gubernatorial nominee.

==== Nominated in February 2023 primary ====
- Okey Ahiwe: former Chief of Staff to the Governor
  - Running mate—Jasper Uche

==== Eliminated in February 2023 primary ====
- Lucky Igbokwe: businessman
- Emma Nwaka: former Abia State PDP Chairman and former Senator for Abia North (1992–1993)
- Ude Oko Chukwu: Deputy Governor (2015–present) and former House of Assembly member for Ohafia North (2003–2015)
- Sampson Orji: former Commissioner for Special Duties (2011–2015), former Commissioner for Commerce (2009–2011), and former House of Assembly member for Arochukwu (1999–2003)

==== Withdrew from February 2023 primary ====
- Ezenwanyi Ngozi Jonah
- Bob Ogu: former Commissioner for Works
- Eric Opah: businessman

==== Declined to run in February 2023 primary ====
- Ncheta Omerekpe: businessman

==== Results of February 2023 primary ====
Candidates' vote share
1. Okey Ahiwe (93.1%)
2. Other candidates (6.94%)

PDP primary results
Party	Candidate	Votes	%
PDP	Okey Ahiwe	469	93.06%
PDP	Lucky Igbokwe	12	2.38%
PDP	Ude Oko Chukwu	12	2.38%
PDP	Sampson Orji	11	2.18%
PDP	Emma Nwaka	0	0.00%
Total votes		504	100.00%

=== Minor parties ===
- Emeka Michael Nwankpa (Accord)
  - Running mate: Okpere Udo
- Wilson Kalu Akuma (Action Alliance)
  - Running mate: Gilead Nwanganga
- Bond Ohuche (African Action Congress)
  - Running mate: Princewill Chidiebere Ekeke
- Sunday Onuoha (African Democratic Congress)
  - Running mate: Glory Ngozi Nwasinmuo
- Chibuike Jonas (Action Democratic Party)
  - Running mate: Ifeoma Stella Okoya-Thomas
- Anagha Ndukwo Anagha (Allied Peoples Movement)
  - Running mate: Oliver Chinnendu Sunday
- Mascot Kalu (Action Peoples Party)
  - Running mate: Osondu Christopher Akoma
- Lucky Achinihu Ekeji (Boot Party)
  - Running mate: Goodness Ekenma Azuonye
- Alex Otti (Labour Party)
  - Running mate: Ikechukwu Emetu
- Ukpai Iro Ukpai (New Nigeria Peoples Party)
  - Running mate: Josiah Tony Chiedozie
- Ijeoma Kalu (National Rescue Movement)
  - Running mate: Nnamdi Chika Ireaja Eze
- Nnenna Ngwa'Mma Lancaster-Okoro (People's Redemption Party)
  - Running mate: Martin Chibuike Nwakanma
- Gladys Ikonnaya Ngozika Johnson-Ogbuneke (Social Democratic Party)
  - Running mate: Damian Ifeanyichukwu Dicson
- Enyinnaya Nwafor (Young Progressives Party)
  - Running mate: Chima Anyaso
- Prince Chibunna Onukwu (Zenith Labour Party)
  - Running mate: Amobi Eugene Nwosu

== Campaign ==
Prior to the formal campaign period start in October 2022, analysts noted the deep divides within the state PDP due to the fallout from the primary and the jettisoning of zoning. Observers claimed the crisis provided an opportunity to Emenike and Ibe along with the more prominent minor party nominees—Sunday Onuoha (ADC), Alex Otti (LP), and Enyinnaya Nwafor (YPP). The next month, on 7 November, the first public poll—conducted by NOI Polls and commissioned by the Anap Foundation—was released for the race with it showing a substantial lead for Otti while Ikonne, Ibe, and Emenike trailed in second, third, and fourth, respectively. In the weeks afterwards, ThisDay profiled Otti's campaign and chances while The Guardian analysis focused on the election's potential impact on future zoning and the state Charter of Equity.

As the general election campaign commenced, internal and legal disputes within the APC and APGA derailed their campaigns as court rulings switched legal recognition from Emenike to Ogah in the APC and annulled the APGA primary in mid-November and early December, respectively. Both decisions were appealed with Emenike being reinstated as nominee in late December while the APGA case continued. Similarly, the PDP faced continued challenges to its primary that carried into the new year along with controversy over Ikonne's unknown whereabouts from late November to January; It was not until mid-January that Ikpeazu revealed that Ikonne had been ill and was in the process of recovery. However, opponents claimed that Ikonne's health status was far worse than Ikpeazu had stated and the PDP was concealing his true condition. These statements were confirmed on 25 January, when Ikonne's family announced that he had died in the National Hospital, Abuja. Amid the continued APC crisis and the renewed PDP divides surrounding its new primary, pundits noted that the divisions in the two parties gave other candidates a much better chance of victory. Nonetheless, the PDP nominated Ahaiwe but doubts emerged over the prospect of such a sudden candidacy. Litigation returned to the forefront just days later as APGA's appeal of its primary annulment was dismissed by a Court of Appeal judgment on 8 February and, since the High Court's fourteen days limit had elapsed, the judgment also barred APGA from fielding any gubernatorial nominee in the election; however, another appeal overturned the ruling later that month.

Later in February, focus switched to the presidential election on 25 February. In the election, Abia State voted for Peter Obi (LP); Obi won the state with 88.4% of the vote, beating Atiku Abubakar (PDP) at 6.1% and Bola Tinubu (APC) at 2.4%. Although the result was unsurprising—Abia is in Obi's southeastern stronghold and projections had favored him—the result led to increased attention on Otti's chances in the gubernatorial race with the EiE-SBM forecast projecting Otti to win "based on the outcome of the presidential elections and the state's evolving voting patterns."

=== Polling ===
Polling organisation/client	Fieldwork date	Sample size	APC	APGA	LP	PDP	Others	Undecided	None/No response/Refused
Polling organisation/client	Fieldwork date	Sample size	Emenike APC	Ibe APGA	Otti LP	Ikonne (Note: Poll conducted prior to Ikonne's death) PDP	Others	Undecided	None/No response/Refused
NOI Polls for Anap Foundation	October 2022	500	3%	4%	20%	9%	3% (Note: Enyinnaya Nwafor (YPP): 2%; Mascot Kalu (APP): 1%)	34%	28% (Note: Refused: 25%; None: 2%)

== Projections ==
Source	Projection	As of
Africa Elects (Note: AfricaElects projections predict the likelihood of a candidate winning a state by categorizing a state as "Safe" for exceedingly likely, "Likely" for somewhat likely, and "Lean" for least likely. If no clear determination could be made, states are categorized as "tossups".)	Lean Otti	17 March 2023
Enough is Enough- SBM Intelligence (Note: EiE-SBM projections predict which candidates will win states.)	Otti	2 March 2023

== Conduct ==
=== Electoral timetable ===
On 26 February 2022, the Independent National Electoral Commission released the timetable, setting out key dates and deadlines for the election. Months later on 27 May 2022, INEC made a slight revision to the timetable, allowing parties extra time to conduct primaries.

- 28 February 2022 – Publication of Notice of Election
- 4 April 2022 – First day for the conduct of party primaries
- 9 June 2022 (Note: The original deadline was 3 June; however, INEC pushed it back to 9 June at the behest of parties.) – Final day for the conduct of party primaries, including the resolution of disputes arising from them
- 1 July 2022 – First day for submission of nomination forms to INEC via the online portal
- 15 July 2022 – Final day for submission of nomination forms to INEC via the online portal
- 12 October 2022 – Commencement of the official campaign period
- 16 March 2023 (Note: The original deadline was 9 March; however, INEC pushed it back to 16 March.) – Final day of the official campaign period

== General election ==
=== Results ===
2023 Abia State gubernatorial election
Party	Candidate	Votes	%
A	Emeka Michael Nwankpa	1,528	0.41%
AA	Wilson Kalu Akuma	474	0.13%
AAC	Bond Ohuche	298	0.08%
ADC	Sunday Onuoha	2,529	0.70%
ADP	Chibuike Jonas	601	0.16%
APC	Ikechi Emenike	24,091	6.72%
APM	Anyim Uguru Chikezie	572	0.15%
APP	Mascot Kalu	11,728	3.3%
APGA	Gregory Ibe	18,119	5.05%
BP	Lucky Achinihu Ekeji	1,141	0.31%
LP	Alex Otti	175,467	48.94%
New Nigeria Peoples Party	Ukpai Iro Ukpai	2,068	0.57%
NRM	Ijeoma Kalu	472	0.13%
PDP	Okey Ahiwe	88,529	24.69%
PRP	Nnenna Ngwa'Mma Lancaster-Okoro	168	0.04%
SDP	Gladys Ikonnaya Ngozi Johnson-Ogbuneke	773	0.21%
YPP	Enyinnaya Nwafor	28,972	8.08%
ZLP	Prince Chibunna Onukwu	1,011	0.28%
Total votes		358,541	90.4%
Invalid or blank votes		34,520	9.6%
Turnout		393,061	100.00%

==== By senatorial district ====
The results of the election by senatorial district.

LGA	TBD APC		TBD APGA		Alex Otti LP		Okey Ahiwe PDP		Others		Total Valid Votes
LGA	Votes	Percentage	Votes	Percentage	Votes	Percentage	Votes	Percentage	Votes	Percentage	Total Valid Votes
Abia Central Senatorial District (Note: Comprising the local government areas of Ikwuano, Isiala Ngwa North, Isiala Ngwa South, Umuahia North, and Umuahia South.)	TBD	%	TBD	%	TBD	%	TBD	%	TBD	%	TBD
Abia North Senatorial District (Note: Comprising the local government areas of Arochukwu, Bende, Isuikwuato, Ohafia, and Umu Nneochi.)	TBD	%	TBD	%	TBD	%	TBD	%	TBD	%	TBD
Abia South Senatorial District (Note: Comprising the local government areas of Aba North, Aba South, Obi Ngwa, Osisioma Ngwa, Ugwunagbo, Ukwa East, and Ukwa West.)	TBD	%	TBD	%	TBD	%	TBD	%	TBD	%	TBD
Totals	TBD	TBD%	TBD	TBD%	TBD	TBD%	TBD	TBD%	TBD	TBD%	TBD

==== By federal constituency ====
The results of the election by federal constituency.

Federal Constituency	TBD APC		TBD APGA		Alex Otti LP		Okey Ahiwe PDP		Others		Total Valid Votes
Federal Constituency	Votes	Percentage	Votes	Percentage	Votes	Percentage	Votes	Percentage	Votes	Percentage	Total Valid Votes
Aba North/Aba South Federal Constituency (Note: Comprising the local government areas of Aba North and Aba South.)	TBD	%	TBD	%	TBD	%	TBD	%	TBD	%	TBD
Arochukwu/Ohafia Federal Constituency (Note: Comprising the local government areas of Arochukwu and Ohafia.)	TBD	%	TBD	%	TBD	%	TBD	%	TBD	%	TBD
Bende Federal Constituency (Note: Comprising the local government area of Bende.)	TBD	%	TBD	%	TBD	%	TBD	%	TBD	%	TBD
Isiala Ngwa North/Isiala Ngwa South Federal Constituency (Note: Comprising the local government areas of Isiala-Ngwa North and Isiala-Ngwa South.)	TBD	%	TBD	%	TBD	%	TBD	%	TBD	%	TBD
Isuikwuato/Umunneochi Federal Constituency (Note: Comprising the local government areas of Isuikwuato and Umu-Nneochi.)	TBD	%	TBD	%	TBD	%	TBD	%	TBD	%	TBD
Obingwa/Ugwunagbo/Osisioma Federal Constituency (Note: Comprising the local government areas of Obi Ngwa, Osisioma Ngwa, and Ugwunagbo.)	TBD	%	TBD	%	TBD	%	TBD	%	TBD	%	TBD
Ukwa East/Ukwa West Federal Constituency (Note: Comprising the local government areas of Ukwa East and Ukwa West.)	TBD	%	TBD	%	TBD	%	TBD	%	TBD	%	TBD
Umuahia North/Umuahia South/Ikwuano Federal Constituency (Note: Comprising the local government areas of Ikwuano, Umuahia North, and Umuahia South.)	TBD	%	TBD	%	TBD	%	TBD	%	TBD	%	TBD
Totals	TBD	%	TBD	%	TBD	%	TBD	%	TBD	%	TBD

==== By local government area ====
The results of the election by local government area.

LGA	TBD APC		TBD APGA		Alex Otti LP		Okey Ahiwe PDP		Others		Total Valid Votes	Turnout Percentage
LGA	Votes	Percentage	Votes	Percentage	Votes	Percentage	Votes	Percentage	Votes	Percentage	Total Valid Votes	Turnout Percentage
Aba North	TBD	%	TBD	%	TBD	%	TBD	%	TBD	%	TBD	%
Aba South	TBD	%	TBD	%	TBD	%	TBD	%	TBD	%	TBD	%
Arochukwu	TBD	%	TBD	%	TBD	%	TBD	%	TBD	%	TBD	%
Bende	TBD	%	TBD	%	TBD	%	TBD	%	TBD	%	TBD	%
Ikwuano	TBD	%	TBD	%	TBD	%	TBD	%	TBD	%	TBD	%
Isiala Ngwa North	TBD	%	TBD	%	TBD	%	TBD	%	TBD	%	TBD	%
Isiala Ngwa South	TBD	%	TBD	%	TBD	%	TBD	%	TBD	%	TBD	%
Isuikwuato	TBD	%	TBD	%	TBD	%	TBD	%	TBD	%	TBD	%
Obi Ngwa	TBD	%	TBD	%	TBD	%	TBD	%	TBD	%	TBD	%
Ohafia	TBD	%	TBD	%	TBD	%	TBD	%	TBD	%	TBD	%
Osisioma	TBD	%	TBD	%	TBD	%	TBD	%	TBD	%	TBD	%
Ugwunagbo	TBD	%	TBD	%	TBD	%	TBD	%	TBD	%	TBD	%
Ukwa East	TBD	%	TBD	%	TBD	%	TBD	%	TBD	%	TBD	%
Ukwa West	TBD	%	TBD	%	TBD	%	TBD	%	TBD	%	TBD	%
Umuahia North	TBD	%	TBD	%	TBD	%	TBD	%	TBD	%	TBD	%
Umuahia South	TBD	%	TBD	%	TBD	%	TBD	%	TBD	%	TBD	%
Umu Nneochi	TBD	%	TBD	%	TBD	%	TBD	%	TBD	%	TBD	%
Totals	TBD	%	TBD	%	TBD	%	TBD	%	TBD	%	TBD	%

== See also ==
- 2023 Nigerian elections
- 2023 Nigerian gubernatorial elections
- Primary elections in Nigeria
