= List of local government areas in Abia State =

Abia State is one of the states of Nigeria. It has 17 Local government areas. The chairman is Chief executive officer of the local government council. The council may include the secretary, supervisory councilors and councilors, and are usually subdivided into five departments: local administration, health, agriculture, education and labour.

The administrative headquarters is usually one of the urban or semi-urban areas within the local government. High courts are in Aba, Ohafia and Umuahia; Magistrates' courts are in Aba, Ohafia, Arochukwu, Bende, Isuikwuato and Ukwa (south and north); customary courts are in Ukwa, Isuikwuato, Bende, Ohafia, and Arochukwu. In Abia, autonomous communities exists with an Eze as the traditional leader.

== List ==
- Aba North
- Aba South
- Arochukwu
- Bende
- Ikwuano
- Isiala Ngwa North
- Isiala Ngwa South
- Isuikwuato
- Obi Ngwa
- Ohafia
- Osisioma Ngwa
- Ugwunagbo
- Ukwa East
- Ukwa West
- Umuahia North
- Umuahia South
- Umu Nneochi
