= 2023 Nigerian presidential election in Abia State =

- 25 February 2023
- Registered: 2,120,808
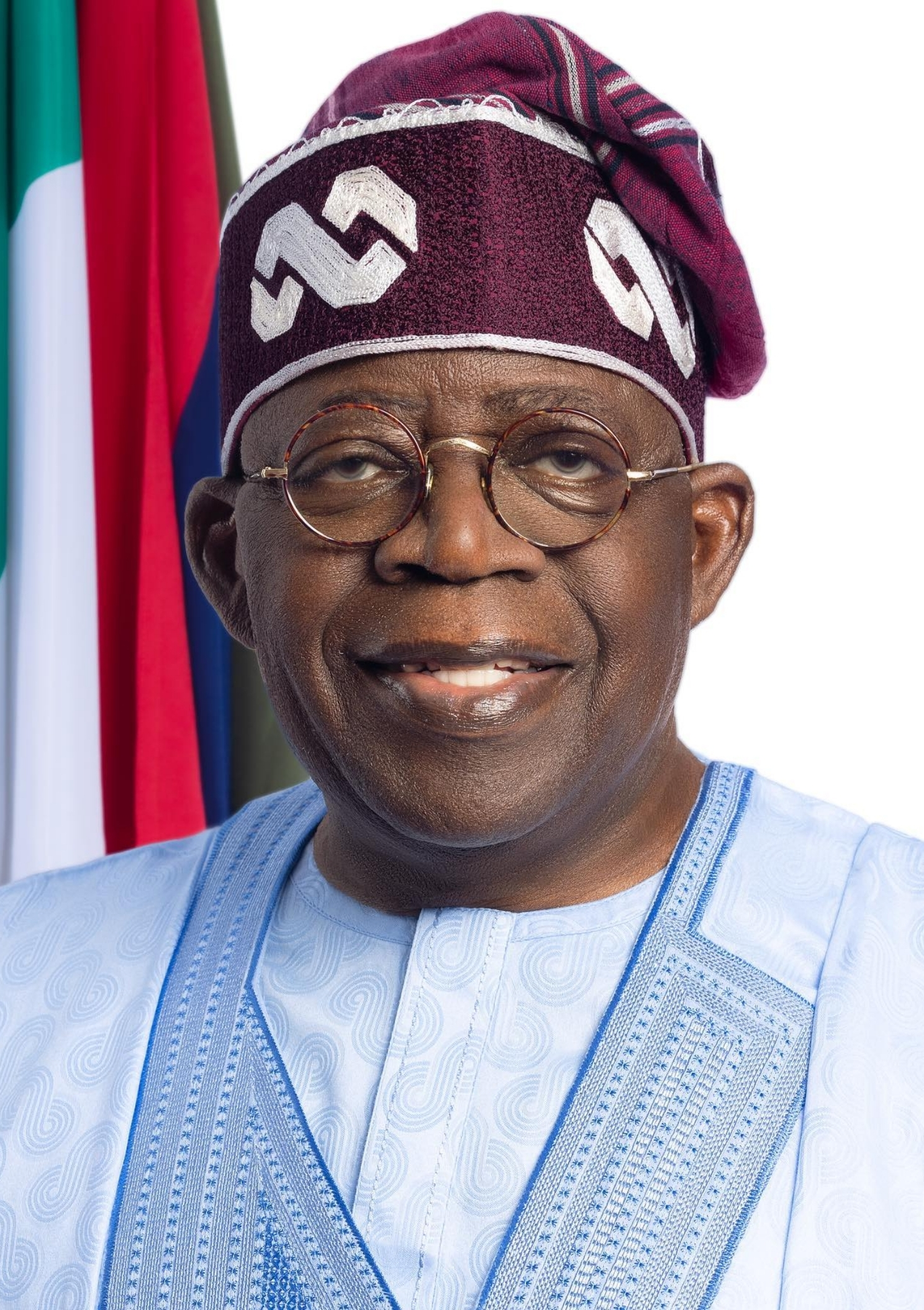

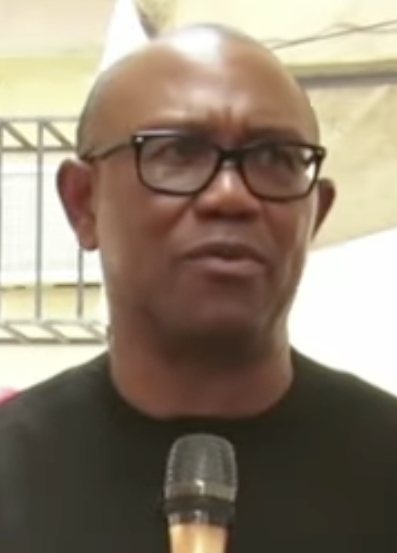

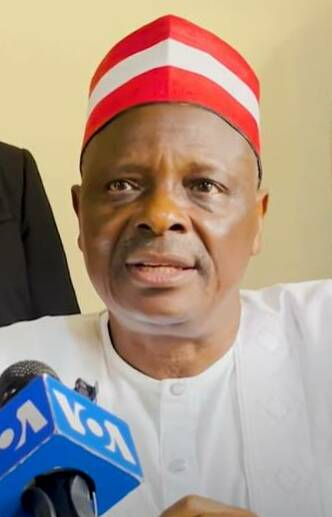

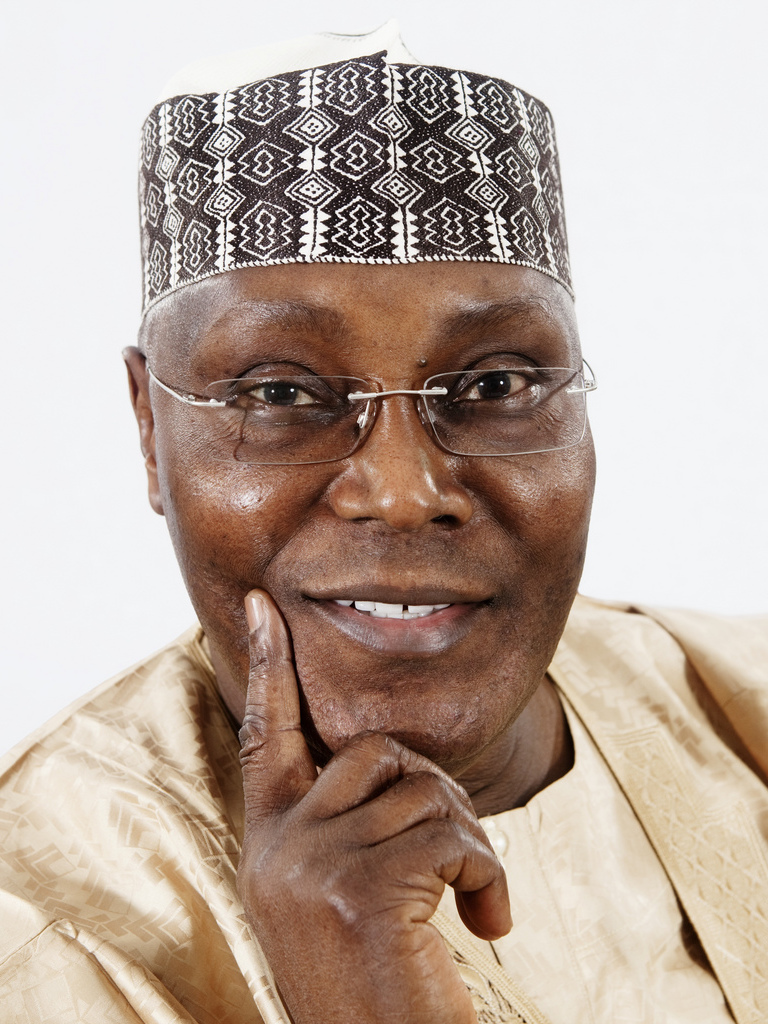
Nominee	Bola Tinubu	Peter Obi
Party	APC	LP
Home state	Lagos	Anambra
Running mate	Kashim Shettima	Yusuf Datti Baba-Ahmed
Nominee	Rabiu Kwankwaso	Atiku Abubakar
Party	NNPP	PDP
Home state	Kano	Adamawa
Running mate	Isaac Idahosa	Ifeanyi Okowa
President before election
Muhammadu Buhari
APC
Elected President
Bola Tinubu
APC

The 2023 Nigerian presidential election in Abia State was held on 25 February 2023 as part of the nationwide 2023 Nigerian presidential election to elect the president and vice president of Nigeria. Other federal elections, including elections to the House of Representatives and the Senate, were also held on the same date while state elections were held two weeks afterward on 11 March.

Peter Obi — the nominee of the Labour Party — received 88.4% of the vote and won the state by over 300,000 votes, a 82.3% margin of victory, over runner-up Atiku Abubakar of the Peoples Democratic Party at 6.1%. The other two major contenders, Bola Tinubu (All Progressives Congress) and Rabiu Kwankwaso (New Nigeria People's Party), trailed with 2.4% and 0.3%, respectively.

== Background ==
Abia State is a small, Igbo-majority southeastern state; although it is one of the most developed states in the nation, Abia has faced challenges in security as both the nationwide kidnapping epidemic and separatist violence have heavily affected the region. Originally launched ostensibly to defend ethnic Igbos from herdsmen and government attacks, the separatist organization Indigenous People of Biafra's Eastern Security Network began violently enforcing economically destructive weekly lockdowns in 2021 and swiftly were criticized for committing human rights abuses against civilians it was meant to protect. These atrocities coupled with law enforcement brutality and herder–farmer clashes worsened the security situation prior to the election.

Politically, the 2019 elections were categorized as a solidification of the Abia PDP's control but a slight expansion of the APC on the federal level. Statewise, incumbent PDP Governor Okezie Ikpeazu won re-election with over 60% of the vote and the vast majority of House of Assembly seats were won by the PDP. On the other hand, while the PDP was still successful federally, it lost ground only winning seven House of Representatives seats and two Senate seats compared to all nine and all three in 2015. For the presidency, Abia was easily won by PDP nominee Atiku Abubakar with about 68% but still swung towards the APC and had strikingly low turnout.

== Polling ==
Polling organisation/client	Fieldwork date	Sample size					Others	Undecided	Undisclosed	Not voting
Polling organisation/client	Fieldwork date	Sample size	Tinubu APC	Obi LP	Kwankwaso NNPP	Abubakar PDP	Others	Undecided	Undisclosed	Not voting
BantuPage	January 2023	N/A	1%	83%	3%	3%	–	6%	4%	1%
Nextier (Abia crosstabs of national poll)	27 January 2023	N/A	1.5%	93.8%	–	1.5%	–	3.1%	–	–
SBM Intelligence for EiE (Abia crosstabs of national poll)	22 January-6 February 2023	N/A	2%	17%	–	2%	2%	78%	–	–

== Projections ==
Source	Projection		As of
Africa Elects (Note: AfricaElects projections predict the likelihood of a candidate winning a state by categorizing a state as "Safe" for exceedingly likely, "Likely" for somewhat likely, and "Lean" for least likely. If no clear determination could be made, states are categorized as "tossups".)	Safe Obi		24 February 2023
Dataphyte (Note: Dataphyte projections predict candidates' projected votal shares in each state.)
Dataphyte	Tinubu:	14.38%	11 February 2023
Dataphyte	Obi:	62.79%	11 February 2023
Dataphyte	Abubakar:	18.99%	11 February 2023
Dataphyte	Others:	3.84%	11 February 2023
Enough is Enough- SBM Intelligence (Note: EiE-SBM projections predict which candidates will win states.)	Obi		17 February 2023
SBM Intelligence (Note: SBM projections predict which candidates will win states or, if no determination could be made, categorizes states as "Too close to call" (TCC).)	Obi		15 December 2022
ThisDay (Note: ThisDay projections predict candidates' projected votal shares in each state.)
ThisDay	Tinubu:	10%	27 December 2022
ThisDay	Obi:	60%	27 December 2022
ThisDay	Kwankwaso:	–	27 December 2022
ThisDay	Abubakar:	15%	27 December 2022
ThisDay	Others/Undecided:	15%	27 December 2022
The Nation (Note: SBM projections predict which candidates will win states or, if no determination could be made, categorizes states as "Battlegrounds.")	Obi		12-19 February 2023

== General election ==
=== Results ===
2023 Nigerian presidential election in Abia State
Party	Candidate	Votes	%
A	Christopher Imumolen		
AA	Hamza al-Mustapha		
ADP	Yabagi Sani		
APP	Osita Nnadi		
AAC	Omoyele Sowore		
ADC	Dumebi Kachikwu		
APC	Bola Tinubu		
APGA	Peter Umeadi		
APM	Princess Chichi Ojei		
BP	Sunday Adenuga		
LP	Peter Obi		
NRM	Felix Johnson Osakwe		
New Nigeria Peoples Party	Rabiu Kwankwaso		
PRP	Kola Abiola		
PDP	Atiku Abubakar		
SDP	Adewole Adebayo		
YPP	Malik Ado-Ibrahim		
ZLP	Dan Nwanyanwu		
Total votes			100.00%
Invalid or blank votes			N/A
Turnout			

==== By senatorial district ====
The results of the election by senatorial district.

Senatorial district	Bola Tinubu APC		Atiku Abubakar PDP		Peter Obi LP		Rabiu Kwankwaso NNPP		Others		Total valid votes
Senatorial district	Votes	%	Votes	%	Votes	%	Votes	%	Votes	%	Total valid votes
Abia Central Senatorial District (Note: Comprising the local government areas of Ikwuano, Isiala Ngwa North, Isiala Ngwa South, Umuahia North, and Umuahia South.)	TBD	%	TBD	%	TBD	%	TBD	%	TBD	%	TBD
Abia North Senatorial District (Note: Comprising the local government areas of Arochukwu, Bende, Isuikwuato, Ohafia, and Umu Nneochi.)	TBD	%	TBD	%	TBD	%	TBD	%	TBD	%	TBD
Abia South Senatorial District (Note: Comprising the local government areas of Aba North, Aba South, Obi Ngwa, Osisioma Ngwa, Ugwunagbo, Ukwa East, and Ukwa West.)	TBD	%	TBD	%	TBD	%	TBD	%	TBD	%	TBD
Totals	TBD	%	TBD	%	TBD	%	TBD	%	TBD	%	TBD

==== By federal constituency ====
The results of the election by federal constituency.

Federal constituency	Bola Tinubu APC		Atiku Abubakar PDP		Peter Obi LP		Rabiu Kwankwaso NNPP		Others		Total valid votes
Federal constituency	Votes	%	Votes	%	Votes	%	Votes	%	Votes	%	Total valid votes
Aba North/Aba South Federal Constituency (Note: Comprising the local government areas of Aba North and Aba South.)	TBD	%	TBD	%	TBD	%	TBD	%	TBD	%	TBD
Arochukwu/Ohafia Federal Constituency (Note: Comprising the local government areas of Arochukwu and Ohafia.)	TBD	%	TBD	%	TBD	%	TBD	%	TBD	%	TBD
Bende Federal Constituency (Note: Comprising the local government area of Bende.)	TBD	%	TBD	%	TBD	%	TBD	%	TBD	%	TBD
Isiala Ngwa North/Isiala Ngwa South Federal Constituency (Note: Comprising the local government areas of Isiala-Ngwa North and Isiala-Ngwa South.)	TBD	%	TBD	%	TBD	%	TBD	%	TBD	%	TBD
Isuikwuato/Umunneochi Federal Constituency (Note: Comprising the local government areas of Isuikwuato and Umu-Nneochi.)	TBD	%	TBD	%	TBD	%	TBD	%	TBD	%	TBD
Obingwa/Ugwunagbo/Osisioma Federal Constituency (Note: Comprising the local government areas of Obi Ngwa, Osisioma Ngwa, and Ugwunagbo.)	TBD	%	TBD	%	TBD	%	TBD	%	TBD	%	TBD
Ukwa East/Ukwa West Federal Constituency (Note: Comprising the local government areas of Ukwa East and Ukwa West.)	TBD	%	TBD	%	TBD	%	TBD	%	TBD	%	TBD
Umuahia North/Umuahia South/Ikwuano Federal Constituency (Note: Comprising the local government areas of Ikwuano, Umuahia North, and Umuahia South.)	TBD	%	TBD	%	TBD	%	TBD	%	TBD	%	TBD
Totals	TBD	%	TBD	%	TBD	%	TBD	%	TBD	%	TBD

==== By local government area ====
The results of the election by local government area.

Local government area	Bola Tinubu APC		Atiku Abubakar PDP		Peter Obi LP		Rabiu Kwankwaso NNPP		Others		Total valid votes	Turnout (%)
Local government area	Votes	%	Votes	%	Votes	%	Votes	%	Votes	%	Total valid votes	Turnout (%)
Aba North	TBD	%	TBD	%	TBD	%	TBD	%	TBD	%	TBD	%
Aba South	TBD	%	TBD	%	TBD	%	TBD	%	TBD	%	TBD	%
Arochukwu	TBD	%	TBD	%	TBD	%	TBD	%	TBD	%	TBD	%
Bende	TBD	%	TBD	%	TBD	%	TBD	%	TBD	%	TBD	%
Ikwuano	TBD	%	TBD	%	TBD	%	TBD	%	TBD	%	TBD	%
Isiala Ngwa North	TBD	%	TBD	%	TBD	%	TBD	%	TBD	%	TBD	%
Isiala Ngwa South	TBD	%	TBD	%	TBD	%	TBD	%	TBD	%	TBD	%
Isuikwuato	TBD	%	TBD	%	TBD	%	TBD	%	TBD	%	TBD	%
Obi Ngwa	TBD	%	TBD	%	TBD	%	TBD	%	TBD	%	TBD	%
Ohafia	TBD	%	TBD	%	TBD	%	TBD	%	TBD	%	TBD	%
Osisioma	TBD	%	TBD	%	TBD	%	TBD	%	TBD	%	TBD	%
Ugwunagbo	TBD	%	TBD	%	TBD	%	TBD	%	TBD	%	TBD	%
Ukwa East	TBD	%	TBD	%	TBD	%	TBD	%	TBD	%	TBD	%
Ukwa West	TBD	%	TBD	%	TBD	%	TBD	%	TBD	%	TBD	%
Umuahia North	TBD	%	TBD	%	TBD	%	TBD	%	TBD	%	TBD	%
Umuahia South	TBD	%	TBD	%	TBD	%	TBD	%	TBD	%	TBD	%
Umu Nneochi	TBD	%	TBD	%	TBD	%	TBD	%	TBD	%	TBD	%
Totals	TBD	%	TBD	%	TBD	%	TBD	%	TBD	%	TBD	%

== See also ==
- 2023 Abia State elections
- 2023 Nigerian presidential election
