= 2019 Abia State gubernatorial election =

2019 gubernatorial election in Abia State, Nigeria

- (Nigeria)
- March 9, 2019
- Turnout: 22.99%
Nominee	Okezie Ikpeazu	Uchechukwu Sampson Ogah
Party	PDP	APC
Running mate	Oko Chukwu	Martins Azubuike
Popular vote	261,127	99,574
Percentage	60.26%	22.98%
Governor before election
Okezie Ikpeazu
PDP
Elected Governor
Okezie Ikpeazu
PDP

The 2019 Abia State gubernatorial election occurred on March 9, 2019. Incumbent PDP Governor Okezie Ikpeazu won re-election for a second term, defeating APC's Uchechukwu Sampson Ogah, and several minor party candidates. The major contenders for the race signed a peace accord agreement in January 2019.

Ikpeazu won in 11 LGAs with a total of 60.26% of popular vote, while Ogah won in four of the state's 17 LGAs with a total of 22.98% of popular vote.

Okezie Ikpeazu emerged unopposed in the PDP gubernatorial primary election. His running mate was Ude Oko Chukwu.

Of the 32 candidates who aspired for the governorship seat, 30 were male, two were female.

== Electoral system ==
The Governor of Abia State is elected using the plurality voting system.

== Primary election ==
=== PDP primary ===
The PDP primary election was held on 30 September 2018. Okezie Ikpeazu, the incumbent governor, who was the party sole aspirant, emerged winner with 1,991 delegate votes. The chairperson of the PDP gubernatorial primary elections in Abia State, Chief Raymond Dokpesi, announced there was a total of 2,350 registered delegates from the 17 LGAs of the state, 2,207 used ballots, with 23 invalid votes.

=== Candidates ===
- Party nominee: Okezie Ikpeazu: Incumbent governor.
- Running mate: Ude Okoh Chukwu.

=== APC primary ===
The All Progressives Congress (APC) primary election earlier slated to be were held on Sunday 30 September 2018 was rescheduled for Monday 1 October 2018 to be witnessed by the party's National Executive Committee (NEC) coming from Abuja.

However, the Dr. Emmanuel Ndukwe faction of state's APC declared Emenike winner of the contest they went ahead to organise on 30 September 2018, in which he was said to have polled 274,133 votes, defeating six other contenders in the contest. But his name, nevertheless, got omitted from the list forward to the INEC by the party's National Working Committee (NWC). Emenike secured an Abuja court injunction which affirmed Emenike as the party's candidate for the upcoming governorship race.

The official primary election was held Tuesday, October 2, 2018, and the results announced at about 3.45 a.m, on Wednesday by the Chairman of the electoral committee, David Iyoha, announcing Uche Ogah, said to have polled 86,875 votes winner ahead of six other aspirants, including: Chief Martins Azubuike with 10,889 votes, Chief Friday Nwosu with 3,529 votes, Chris Akomas with 2,143 votes, Amb. Okey Emuchey with 1,270 votes, Paul Ikonne with 999 votes, and Chief Ikechi Emenike with 455 votes. A total of 106,160 votes were reportedly cast according to the News Agency of Nigeria (NAN) in the state's 184 wards.

Subsequently, a court ruling in January 2019 affirmed Ogah as winner of the election instead of Emenike. Ogah picked Martins Azubuike, thereafter, as his running mate.

=== Candidates ===
- Party nominee: Uchechukwu Sampson Ogah.
- Running mate: Martins Azubuike.
- Friday Nwosu
- Chris Akomas
- Okey Emuchey
- Paul Ikonne
- Ikechi Emenike

== Results ==
A total of 32 candidates registered with the Independent National Electoral Commission to contest in the election. PDP Governor Okezie Ikpeazu won re-election for a second term, defeating APC Uchechukwu Sampson Ogah, and several minor party candidates. Ikpeazu polled 261,127 votes representing 60.26% of total vote cast, and Ogah 99,574 votes representing 22.98%. Both Ogah and Otti rejected this result. Earlier on, Okezie won at the popular opinion polls.

The total number of registered voters in the state was 1,932,892. Total number of votes cast was 444,376, while total number of valid votes was 433,315. Total rejected votes were 11,061. There we're low voters' turnout.

Candidate	Party	Votes	%
Okezie Victor Ikpeazu	People's Democratic Party (PDP)	261,127	60.26
Uchechukwu Sampson Ogah	All Progressives Congress (APC)	99,574	22.98
Alex Otti	All Progressives Grand Alliance (APGA)	64,366	14.85
Hon. (Mrs) Blessing Nwagba	Social Democratic Party (SDP)	2,191	0.51
Okoronkwo Fortunes Paul	Providence People's Congress (PPC)	1,044	0.24
Chukwudi Nnabugwu	People's Party of Nigeria (PPN)	624	0.14
Okey Okoro Udo	Action Democratic Party (ADP)	522	0.12
Igara Ceekay Kalu	Labour Party (LP)	520	0.12
Madu Anthony Chukwuonye	People for Democratic Change (PDC)	442	0.10
Obinna Kelenna	African Democratic Congress (ADC)	333	0.08
Igwo Nnanna Okpan	All Grassroots Alliance (AGA)	293	0.07
Orji Kingsley	Zenith Labour Party (ZLP)	291	0.07
Ulunwa Utokannandu Morgan	Alliance National Party (ANP)	289	0.07
Ubani Vincent Anthony	African Action Congress (AAC)	254	0.06
Onuoha Uko Igwe	All Grand Alliance Party (AGAP)	247	0.06
Opara Alphonsius Obinna	Advanced Congress of Democrats (ACD)	166	0.04
Francis Onugu Ukwu	United Progressive Party (UPP)	151	0.03
Umeh Charles Okezi	Action Peoples Party (APP)	138	0.03
Udeagha Rose Uzoaru	Mega Party of Nigeria (MPN)	124	0.03
Benson Chibunna Onyekachi	Kowa Party (KP)	102	0.02
Nkoro Joseph Ngozi	Young Progressive Party (YPP)	100	0.02
Ahaiwe Udochukwu Elvis	Restoration Party of Nigeria (RP)	89	0.02
Awa Ezekiel Anya	People's Trust (PT)	53	0.01
Emeka Uwakolam	Accord (A)	43	0.01
Charles Okechukwu Okereke	Justice Must Prevail Party (JMPP)	40	0.01
Gilbert Chikezie Chris	Independent Democrats (ID)	38	0.01
Chijioke Owanta	Alliance of Social Democrats (ASD)	35	0.01
Annyalewachi Nwaozuru	Green Party of Nigeria (GPN)	33	0.01
Michael Imojo Ndu	Alliance for a United Nigeria (AUN)	29	0.01
Paul Chinedu Emmanuel	Fresh Democratic Party (FRESH)	22	0.01
Chinwuba Queen Edith Asikaralinoun	Change Advocacy Party (CAP)	21	0.00
Obasi Heavens Ugochukwu	Democratic Alternative (DA)	14	0.00
Total		433,315	100.00
Valid votes		433,315	97.51
Invalid/blank votes		11,061	2.49
Total votes		444,376	100.00
Registered voters/turnout		1,932,892	22.99
Source: INEC

=== By local government area ===
Here are the results of the election from the local government areas of the state for the two major parties. The total valid votes of 433,315 represents the 32 political parties that participated in the election. Green represents LGAs won by Ikpeazu. Blue represents LGAs won by Ogah. White represents LGAs won by Otti.

County (LGA)	Okezie Ikpeazu PDP		Uche Ogah APC		Total votes
County (LGA)	#	%	#	%	#
Aba North	8,429		4,209		
Aba South	5,256		5,418		
Arochukwu	5,070		3,819		
Bende	7,265		12,172		
Ikwuano	6,286		5,619		
Isiala Ngwa North	19,209		2,404		
Isiala Ngwa South	19,672		1,569		
Isiukwuato	3,564		14,146		
Obi Ngwa	78,803		3,390		
Ohaofia	19,346		6,718		
Osisioma	19,835		1,981		
Ugwunagbo	22,084		1,865		
Ukwa East	3,819		1,447		
Ukwa West	11,602		3,140		
Umuahia North	15,627		16,833		
Umuahia South	8,257		7,606		
Umunneochi	7,004		7,238		
Totals	261,127		99,574		-
