= Onuoha (disambiguation) =

Nedum Onuoha (born 1986) is a Nigerian-born footballer and television pundit.

Onuoha is a name of Igbo origin.

Onuoha is the name of:

- David Onuoha (fl. 2004-2020), Nigerian bishop
- Georgina Onuoha (born 1980), Nigerian actress, model, and television personality
- Guchi (musician) (Ugochi Lydia Onuoha, born 1996 or 1997), Nigerian singer
- Johnson Onuoha (fl. 2019), Nigerian bishop
- Kalu Mosto Onuoha (born 1947), Nigerian professor, president of the Nigerian Academy of Science
- Mimi Onuoha (born 1989), Nigerian American visual artist and academic
- Miriam Onuoha (fl. 2015), Nigerian politician
- Ndukwe Onuoha (born 1982), Nigerian-born British poet and politician
- Onuoha Ogbonna (born 1988), Nigerian footballer
- Randy Onuoha (born 1994), Dutch footballer
- Sunday Onuoha (born 1964), Nigerian bishop and author
- Uzoamaka Onuoha (fl. 2018)), Nigerian actress
