= Azubuike =

Azubuike // is both a male given name and a surname of Igbo origin, meaning “the past is my strength”. It may refer to:

== Given name ==
- Azubuike Egwuekwe (born 1989), Nigerian football defender
- Azubuike Ihejirika (born 1956), Nigerian general
- Azubuike Ishiekwene (born 1965), Nigerian newspaper journalist
- Azubuike Okechukwu (born 1997), Nigerian football midfielder
- Azubuike Oliseh (born 1978), Nigerian football midfielder

== Surname ==
- Chibuzor Azubuike (born 1986), Nigerian rapper, known by stage name Phyno
- Kelenna Azubuike (born 1983), American basketball player
- Martins Azubuike, Nigerian politician
- Owen Azubuike (c. 1947 – 2016), Nigerian bishop
- Udoka Azubuike (born 1999), Nigerian-American basketball player

== See also ==
- Azubu, a defunct game streaming website
