= Isiala-Ngwa =

Isiala-Ngwa may refer to:

- One of two local government areas of Abia State, Nigeria:
  - Isiala-Ngwa North
  - Isiala-Ngwa South
- Diocese of Isiala-Ngwa, an Anglican diocese
