= 1999 Abia State House of Assembly election =

The 1999 Abia State House of Assembly election was held on January 9, 1999, to elect members of the Abia State House of Assembly in Nigeria. All the 24 seats were up for election in the Abia State House of Assembly.

== Results ==
=== Osisioma South ===
APP candidate Donatus Nwankpa won the election.

1999 Abia State House of Assembly election
Party	Candidate	Votes	%
All People's Party (Nigeria)	Donatus Nwankpa		
All People's Party (Nigeria) hold			

=== Umuahia North ===
PDP candidate Nkem Chris Ike won the election.

1999 Abia State House of Assembly election
Party	Candidate	Votes	%
PDP	Nkem Chris Ike		
PDP hold			

=== Umuahia Central ===
PDP candidate Stanley Ohajuruka won the election.

1999 Abia State House of Assembly election
Party	Candidate	Votes	%
PDP	Stanley Ohajuruka		
PDP hold			

=== Isiala Ngwa North ===
PDP candidate Christopher Enweremadu won the election.

1999 Abia State House of Assembly election
Party	Candidate	Votes	%
PDP	Christopher Enweremadu		
PDP hold			

=== Isiala Ngwa South ===
APP candidate Remigius Nji won the election.

1999 Abia State House of Assembly election
Party	Candidate	Votes	%
All People's Party (Nigeria)	Remigius Nji		
All People's Party (Nigeria) hold			

=== Isuikwuato ===
PDP candidate Ernest Osita Igbe won the election.

1999 Abia State House of Assembly election
Party	Candidate	Votes	%
PDP	Ernest Osita Igbe		
PDP hold			

=== Umuahia East ===
APP candidate Dan Egbogu won the election.

1999 Abia State House of Assembly election
Party	Candidate	Votes	%
All People's Party (Nigeria)	Dan Egbogu		
All People's Party (Nigeria) hold			

=== Umunneochi ===
PDP candidate Matthew Ibeh won the election.

1999 Abia State House of Assembly election
Party	Candidate	Votes	%
PDP	Matthew Ibeh		
PDP hold			

=== Ukwa West ===
PDP candidate Ngozi Ulunwa won the election.

1999 Abia State House of Assembly election
Party	Candidate	Votes	%
PDP	Ngozi Ulunwa		
PDP hold			

=== Ukwa East ===
PDP candidate Emeka Stanley won the election.

1999 Abia State House of Assembly election
Party	Candidate	Votes	%
PDP	Emeka Stanley		
PDP hold			

=== Obingwa East ===
PDP candidate Eric Acho Nwakanma won the election.

1999 Abia State House of Assembly election
Party	Candidate	Votes	%
PDP	Eric Acho Nwakanma		
PDP hold			

=== Obingwa West ===
PDP candidate Chima Ochieze won the election.

1999 Abia State House of Assembly election
Party	Candidate	Votes	%
PDP	Chima Ochieze		
PDP hold			

=== Umuahia South ===
APP candidate Ndukwe Adindu won the election.

1999 Abia State House of Assembly election
Party	Candidate	Votes	%
All People's Party (Nigeria)	Ndukwe Adindu		
All People's Party (Nigeria) hold			

=== Ikwuano ===
PDP candidate Wisdom Ogbonna won the election.

1999 Abia State House of Assembly election
Party	Candidate	Votes	%
PDP	Wisdom Ogbonna		
PDP hold			

=== Ugwunagbo ===
PDP candidate James Maraizu won the election.

1999 Abia State House of Assembly election
Party	Candidate	Votes	%
PDP	James Maraizu		
PDP hold			

=== Ohafia North ===
PDP candidate Tony Okoro Kalu won the election.

1999 Abia State House of Assembly election
Party	Candidate	Votes	%
PDP	Tony Okoro Kalu		
PDP hold			

=== Aba Central ===
PDP candidate Nnamdi Egege won the election.

1999 Abia State House of Assembly election
Party	Candidate	Votes	%
PDP	Nnamdi Egege		
PDP hold			

=== Osisioma North ===
PDP candidate Kingsley Mgbeahuru won the election.

1999 Abia State House of Assembly election
Party	Candidate	Votes	%
PDP	Kingsley Mgbeahuru		
PDP hold			

=== Aba North ===
APP candidate Blessing Azuru won the election.

1999 Abia State House of Assembly election
Party	Candidate	Votes	%
All People's Party (Nigeria)	Blessing Azuru		
All People's Party (Nigeria) hold			

=== Arochukwu ===
PDP candidate Sampson Orji won the election.

1999 Abia State House of Assembly election
Party	Candidate	Votes	%
PDP	Sampson Orji		
PDP hold			

=== Aba South ===
APP candidate Obioma Ekpem won the election.

1999 Abia State House of Assembly election
Party	Candidate	Votes	%
All People's Party (Nigeria)	Obioma Ekpem		
All People's Party (Nigeria) hold			

=== Bende North ===
PDP candidate Lekwauwa Orji won the election.

1999 Abia State House of Assembly election
Party	Candidate	Votes	%
PDP	Lekwauwa Orji		
PDP hold			

=== Bende South ===
PDP candidate Emenike Okoroafor won the election.

1999 Abia State House of Assembly election
Party	Candidate	Votes	%
PDP	Emenike Okoroafor		
PDP hold			

=== Ohafia South ===
PDP candidate Bernard Orji won the election.

1999 Abia State House of Assembly election
Party	Candidate	Votes	%
PDP	Bernard Orji		
PDP hold			
