= Uche Ikonne =

Nigerian professor of optometry

Professor Uche Ikonne

Vice-Chancellor of Abia State University
- In office 1 December 2015 – 30 November 2020
- Preceded by: Chibuzo Ogbuagu
- Succeeded by: Onyemachi Maxwell Ogbulu

Personal details
- Born: 15 August 1956
- Died: 25 January 2023 (aged 66)
- Education: Manila Central University; Saint Jude College; Abia State University
- Occupation: Academic; author
- Profession: Optometrist

Uchenna Ikonne(15 August 1956 – 25 January 2023) was a Nigerian professor of optometry and politician. In December 2015, he became the 7th substantive vice-chancellor of Abia State University, having previously served as the rector of Abia State Polytechnic, Aba, from 2014 to 2015.

Ikonne took Abia State University from 93rd position, on assumption of office in 2015, to 27th and 2nd best state university in Nigeria in the 2020 Nigerian University Ranking.

Ikonne was the gubernatorial candidate of the Peoples Democratic Party for the 2023 Abia State elections.

== Early life and education ==
Ikonne was born in Agburuike, Nsulu, in Isiala Ngwa North, Abia State. After attending Ngwa High School in Aba of Abia State, he studied optometry at Manila Central University, Philippines. He also graduated from a specialist master's degree programme in hospital administration at St. Jude College, in the Philippines, and on his return to Nigeria in 1985, he served as a consulting optometrist at Park Lane General Hospital, Enugu, and obtained a Doctor of Philosophy degree in environmental health science from Abia State University.

== Career ==
From 2010 to 2014, Ikonne served as the deputy vice-chancellor (academic) of Abia State University before becoming the rector of Abia State Polytechnic, Aba. In December 2015, he was appointed the 7th substantive vice-chancellor of Abia State University, a position he held until 30 November 2020. He also served as the head of the Department of Optometry in the same institution. While at Abia State University, he served as the acting dean of the Faculty of Health Sciences and deputy provost of the College of Medicine and Health Sciences. In 1993, he was appointed as a member of the Optometrists and Dispensing Opticians Registration Board of Nigeria. He was subsequently appointed chairman of the education committee in Abia State. In 2019, he was appointed chairman of the Governing Board of the Optometrists and Dispensing Opticians Registration Board of Nigeria (ODORBN), serving until 2022. Ikonne won the African Optometric Educator Award of the year 2003 and the Distinguished Merit Award of the Nigerian Optometric Association 2006.

On 25 May 2022, Ikonne was elected as the Peoples Democratic Party candidate for the 2023 Abia State gubernatorial election.

== Death ==
Ikonne died at the National Hospital, Abuja, around 4 am on 25 January 2023, after suffering multiple cardiac arrests.
