= Masters Energy Oil and Gas Ltd. =

Masters Energy Oil & Gas Limited is a Nigerian petroleum products marketing company that operates within the downstream and midstream sectors of the oil and gas industry. It is a subsidiary of Masters Energy Group, a diversified conglomerate headquartered in Lagos, Nigeria. The company holds a license from the Nigerian Midstream and Downstream Petroleum Regulatory Authority (NPRA), previously known as the Department of Petroleum Resources (DPR), to engage in the trading and distribution of petroleum products as well as other energy-related services. The current CEO/Group Managing Director (GMD) is Barrister (Mrs.) Patience Dappa.

== History ==
Masters Energy Oil & Gas Limited was founded by Nigerian entrepreneur Uche Ogah and was incorporated on February 16, 2005, to provide high-quality petroleum products and services to Nigeria’s growing energy market. Initially focused on the importation, bulk purchasing, and distribution of petroleum products, the company expanded its scope in 2011 by obtaining a crude oil lifting license, enabling it to engage in crude oil trading as well as refined product distribution. Over the years, Masters Energy has further diversified into various sectors including power generation, engineering, procurement, and construction (EPC), petrochemicals, aviation, renewable energy, shipping, and marine logistics.

== Operations and services ==
Masters Energy’s main operations include the marketing, trading, and distribution of various petroleum products such as gasoline, diesel, kerosene, and jet fuel. The company operates extensively within the downstream sector but has also established significant midstream infrastructure, allowing it to store, transport, and distribute petroleum products across Nigeria and West Africa.

=== Diversification and subsidiaries ===
As part of its commitment to supporting Nigeria’s energy needs, Masters Energy Group has grown to encompass over 20 subsidiaries across diverse sectors, such as power, EPC, and petrochemicals. Its ventures in aviation, shipping, and marine sectors provide tailored fuel supply and logistics solutions to clients both within Nigeria and internationally. The organization is also involved in community development and various corporate social responsibility (CSR) initiatives aimed at improving education, health care, and infrastructure in local communities.

=== Infrastructure ===
Masters Energy operates one of Nigeria’s largest petroleum storage facilities in Port Harcourt, which significantly enhances its large-scale importation and distribution capabilities. This facility, designed to meet Nigeria's growing energy demands and those of neighboring West African nations, is strategically positioned to streamline fuel distribution across the region.

== Leadership ==
Founded by Uche Ogah; although Ogah stepped down to pursue other ventures, the company continues to thrive under the leadership of Dr. (Mrs.) Patience Dappa, who serves as the CEO and Group Managing Director.

== Community and social impact ==
Masters Energy Group has implemented various initiatives to support local communities, including educational sponsorships, healthcare assistance, and infrastructure projects.
