= O. M. Ogbulu =

Nigerian academic

Onyemachi Maxwell Ogbulu

8th Vice-Chancellor Abia State University Uturu
- In office 1 December 2021 – 1 November 2024
- President: Bola Ahmed Tinubu
- Chancellor: Tor Tiv James Ayatse
- Governor: Alex Otti
- Deputy: Godwin Emezue
- Preceded by: Uchenna Ikonne
- Succeeded by: Ndukwe Okeudo

Personal details
- Born: Onyemachi Maxwell Ogbulu; 18 July 1956 (age 69) Ukwa West, Abia state, Nigeria

Onyemachi Maxwell Ogbulu (born 18 July 1956 in Lagos State, Nigeria), commonly known as O. M. Ogbulu, is a Nigerian academic. He served as the 8th Vice-Chancellor of Abia State University Uturu from December 2021 to November 2024. He earned a Ph.D in Finance from Abia State University, Uturu in 2007.

== Personal life ==
Ogbulu was born on 18 July 1956 in Lagos State, Nigeria. He is from Obozu, Ukwa East and married with three children.
