= Eric Opah =

Nigerian politician)

- Born: Eric Opah
- Education: University of Calabar, Nigeria. B.Sc. Business Administration
- Occupations: Philanthropist, Entrepreneur, Politician
- Political party: All Progressive Congress

Eric Opah is a Nigerian philanthropist, businessman and logistics executive. He is the founder and chief executive officer of Fortune Global Shipping and Logistics Limited. He also serves as chairman of the Abia State chapter of the Nigerian-American Chamber of Commerce and is an associate member of the Institute of Directors Nigeria.

Eric Opah is the candidate of the All Progressive Congress for the 2027 Abia State governorship elections.

== Early life and education ==
Eric Opah was born in Mbubo, Umunna-Nsulu, in Isiala Ngwa North Local Government Area of Abia State. He obtained a Bachelor of Science degree in Business Administration from the University of Calabar.

== Career ==
Opah began his career in the logistics industry with Panalpina, where he gained experience in freight forwarding and shipping operations.

He later worked in air cargo operations and was involved in the establishment of China Southern Airlines operations in Nigeria, serving as Director of Cargo Operations.

In 2006, he founded Fortune Global Shipping and Logistics Limited, a Nigerian logistics and freight forwarding company. He also has interests in aviation as well as oil and gas

Opah has served as a board member of the Nigerian-American Chamber of Commerce, an Associate Member of the Institute of Directors of Nigeria, and has been involved in logistics and shipping industry advocacy in Nigeria.

In 2023, an American university awarded him an honorary doctorate in recognition of his contributions to the logistics and shipping industry. In 2025, he received The Sun Entrepreneur of the Year Award.

== Philanthropy ==
Opah is the founder and president of the Eric Opah Foundation, a non-governmental and non-profit organisation established in 2016. The foundation focuses on healthcare support, youth empowerment, education, scholarships, and community development projects in Nigeria.

The foundation has supported projects including a community complex in Mbubo-Nsulu, Abia State, consisting of a town hall and a primary healthcare centre. It also provides scholarships for undergraduate and postgraduate students.

He is also founder and president of the Mbubo Transformation Group and has been associated with community development initiatives in Abia State.

== Politics ==
Opah has participated in Nigerian politics and was cleared by the Peoples Democratic Party (PDP) for the Abia State rerun gubernatorial primaries in 2023. Currently he is a member of the All Progressives Congress (APC). In 2026, he was reported as an aspirant for the governorship of Abia State 2027 Nigerian general election on the platform of the All Progressives Congress. On 21 May 2026, Opah emerged the flagbearer of the All Progressives Congress for the governorship of Abia State for the 2027 Nigerian general election, after defeating Chief Henry ikoh, a former Federal minister of science and technology in a landslide at the governorship primaries primaries. Opah polled 125,977 votes to Ikoh's 5,905 votes.
