= Emma Nwaka =

Nigerian politician and lawyer

Emmanuel Chiedoziem Nwaka is a Nigerian politician and lawyer who served in the Nigerian Senate representing Aba North federal constituency from 1992 to 1993.

== Early life and education ==
Nwaka was born in 1958 to Godwill Ezuike Nwaka in Ogunduasa in Isuikwuato local government area of Abia State. Nwaka began his primary school education at Municipal Council School, Orogbum in Port Harcourt. He left schooling due to the Nigerian Civil War and continued later at the Local Authority Primary School, Amokwe-Amiyi and Methodist Primary School, Emene in Enugu where he graduated in 1972. Nwaka attended St. Theresa’s Secondary School, Nsukka briefly in 1973 before proceeding to Boys High School, Isuikwuato for his secondary education and graduated with WASSCE in 1977. Nwaka attended Nigerian Institute of Journalism (NIJ) while doing a part-time job in Festac Town before proceeding to University of Nigeria, Nsukka where he graduated in 1982 and was called to the bar in 1983.

== Career ==
Nwaka observed the compulsory one year service for the National Youth Service Corps in the Kano State's Ministry of Justice before working as for Chief James Uba and later establishing Okaome Law Firm.

Nwaka joined the National Republican Convention and was elected as the state legal adviser. During the creation of Abia State, Nwaka resigned as a legal adviser and won in the 1992 Senate election but was cut short in 1993 due to the 1993 Nigerian coup d'état.
