= Umuahala =

Village in Abia State, Nigeria

Coordinates: 5°26′00″N 7°05′30″E

Umuahala is a village in Ukwa West local government area, Abia State, Nigeria.
