= Okey Igwe =

Nigerian politicians

Okey Igwe is a Nigerian politician and lawmaker. He formerly represented Umunneochi constituency in the Abia State House of Assembly.
