= Obinna Ichita =

Nigerian politician

Obinna Ichita is a Nigerian politician. He was a member of the Abia State House of Assembly who represented Aba South constituency.

== Career ==
Ichita represented the Aba South State Constituency in the Abia House of Assembly from 2019 to 2023. In the 2023 general elections, he was the Deputy Governorship candidate of the All Progressives Grand Alliance (APGA) in Abia State.

In January 8, 2024, he was appointed Country Director, German Initiative for Knowledge Transfer eV in Nigeria.
