= Sampson Orji =

Nigerian politician

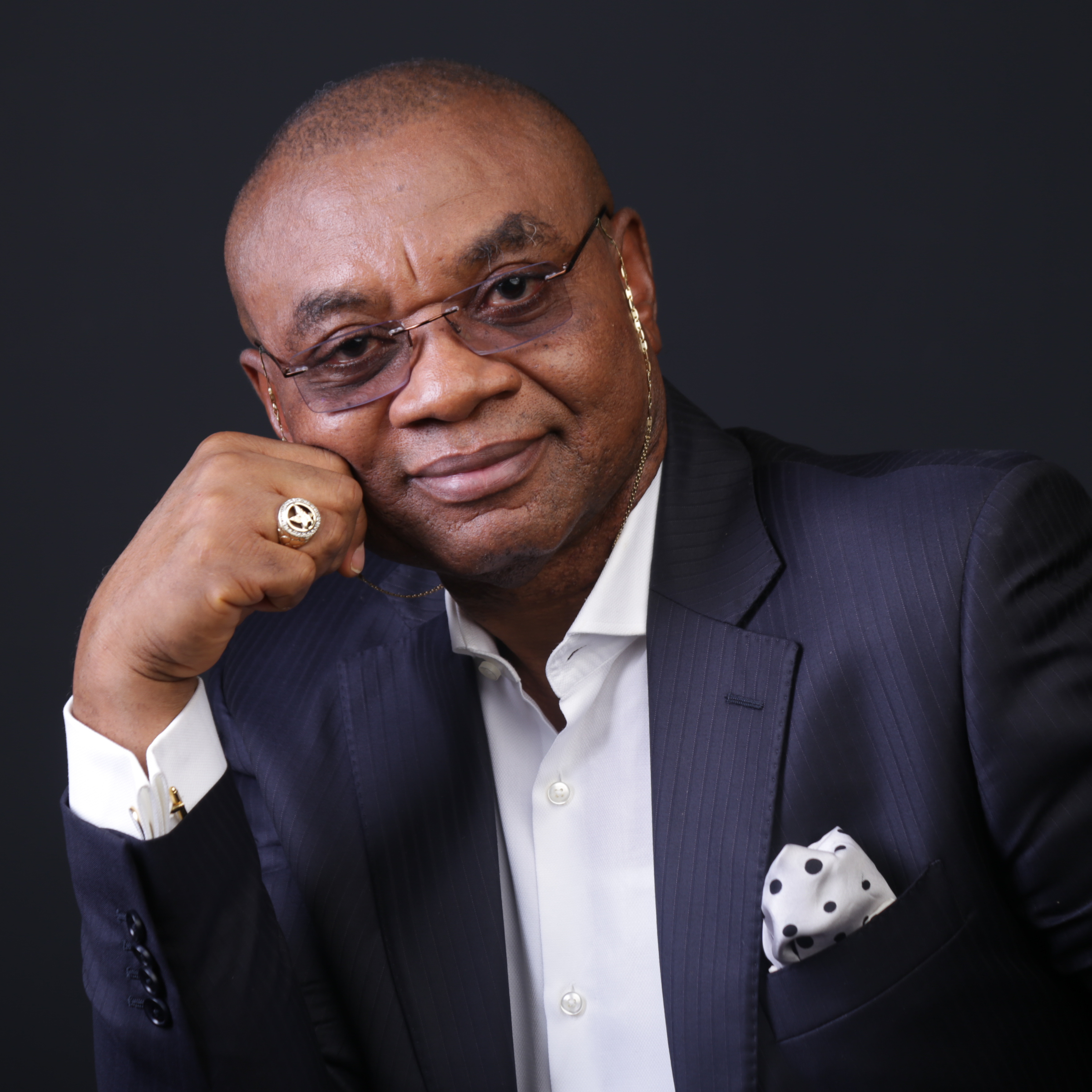
- Born: 24 February 1960 (age 66); Abam, Eastern Region (now Abia State, Nigeria)
- Education: University of Abuja
- Occupations: Politician, Businessperson
- Political party: People's Democratic Party

Sampson Uka Orji (born 24 February 1960) is a Nigerian politician and businessman who served as former Commissioner of Commerce and Industries, and Commissioner for Special Duties, Asset and Debt Recovery. In 2011, he was appointed PDP chieftain from the Council representing Arochukwu. Orji was born to Igbo parents from Abia State, where he spent most of his childhood. He is married and has four children.

Orji is among the declared PDP candidates for the 2023 Abia State gubernatorial election.

== Political career ==
Orji represented the local government area of Arochukuwu, Abia state as a member of the Abia State House of Assembly from 1999 to 2003. He also served as Abia state commissioner for departments of commerce and industry from 2009 to 2011 and later as commissioner for special duties, assets and debts recovery from 2011 to 2015.

On 31 March 2022, Orji officially announced his interest in contesting for Governor of Abia State under PDP
