= Stanley Ohajuruka =

Nigerian politician

Stanley U. Ohajuruka is a Nigerian politician. He served as a two-term member and Speaker of the Abia State House of Assembly.

== Political career ==
Ohajuruka represented the Ikwuano, Umuahia North, and Umuahia South federal constituencies of Abia State in the 6th National Assembly as a member of the House of Representatives. He was succeeded in this position by Samuel Ifeanyi Onuigbo. He was also appointed Acting Governor of Abia State at one point during his political career.

In December 2024, Ohajuruka was appointed by President Bola Tinubu as Executive Director for Finance on the Board of the South-East Development Commission (SEDC).
