= Ngwa High School =

Secondary school in Abia State

- Ụlọ Akwụkwọ Élú ndị Ngwa
- Abayi, Aba, Abia State; Nigeria

Information
- Type: Secondary school
- Motto: "Dives Intra" ("Rich Within")
- Religious affiliation: Church of Nigeria
- Established: September 24, 1954; 71 years ago
- Principal: Felix O. Erondu
- Gender: Male
- Age range: 11 - 18
- Language: English, Igbo
- Campus type: Urban
- Affiliation: Government of Abia State

Ngwa High School is a secondary school for boys in Aba. It is located in Abayi, a town in Osisioma Ngwa.

== History ==
The school was established in 1954 with 29 boys. The school was supposed to be in Umuocham but was relocated to Abayi due to the school land being taken off from the school authority. The school was run through donations from individuals in Ngwa Land. The first principal was Rev W. G. Pollard, a British who served from 1954 to 1960. Afterwards, an African principal S. I. Amadi from Okirika in Rivers State served from 1961 to 1967. After the Nigeria Civil War the school was taken over by the Government of Nigeria but was returned to the Church of Nigeria in 2013.

== Notable alumni ==
- Chukwuemeka Ngozichineke Wogu
- Alex Otti
- Uche Ikonne
