= Sunday Onuoha =

President, Vision Africa International

Sunday Ndukwo Onuoha
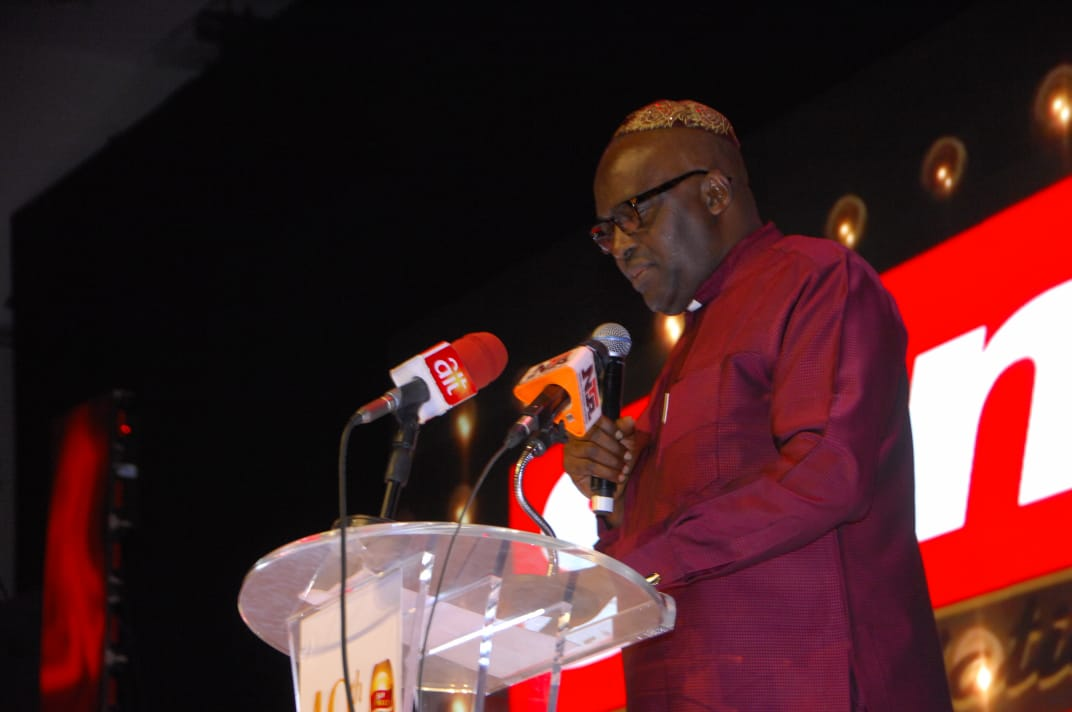
- Bishop Onuoha at the Sun Awards
- Born: Sunday Ndukwo Onuoha; March 22, 1964 (age 62); Item, Abia State, Nigeria
- Occupations: Bishop, author, educationist, minister
- Title: Bishop
- Spouse: Ugonna Osoka
- Children: 3
- Website: sundayonuoha.com

Sunday Ndukwo Onuoha is the founder and president of Vision Africa International and the co-chair, Interfaith Dialogue Forum for Peace. In 2003, he was consecrated bishop in the Nigerian methodist church, and appointed special assistant on privatization in Olusegun Obasanjo's cabinet.

Sunday Onuoha was the gubernatorial candidate of African Democratic Congress (ADC) in Abia State in the 2023 General Elections.

== Early life ==
Sunday Ndukwo Onuoha was born in Item, Abia State, Nigeria, on March 22, 1964. "Sunday" is a common English name among first-generation Christian households in Nigeria.

He joined the ministry at a very young age in 1983 and was consecrated a Bishop of the Methodist Church Nigeria in 2006, having served as the first Bishop of Evangelism at the Lagos Headquarters for many years.

== Education ==
Due to financial difficulty, Onuoha couldn't complete his high school. Instead, he relocated to Aba, where he worked as a tailor and began studies for the Nigerian equivalent of a high school exam for college admission.

In 1983, Onuoha was offered admission into the Methodist Church Nigeria ministry. He went to the Methodist Theological Institute in Sagamu, the Immanuel College of Theology in Ibadan, and the University of Ibadan to get his B.A.

Onuoha traveled to the United States in 1995 to pursue his Masters and Doctorate at Southern Methodist University's Perkins School of Theology in Dallas, Texas. The title of Onuoha's doctoral thesis was Vision Africa.

== Career ==
Onuoha was a pastor in numerous congregations, a seminary professor, and a mission and outreach worker in Nigeria. He also served as the first Chairman of the Youths for the Nigerian state of Abia.

He was named special assistant on privatization to Nigerian President Olusegun Obasanjo's cabinet in 2003.

== Ministry ==
Onuoha was a member of an evangelical group attending a camp gathering on May 25, 1978. Onuoha witnessed a God who cried on the cross in Jesus on that day. God did not abandon Jesus in the midst of his screams for help. Onuoha resolved at the age of 14 to spend the rest of his life sharing that same love with others.

In 2006, he was bishop of Methodist Church Nigeria, where he was the first bishop in charge of evangelism. In 2012, he was named World Methodist Evangelism's regional secretary for West Africa.

Onuoha was named president of the Nigerian Inter-Faith Action Association (NIFAA) in 2009.

== Family ==
Onuoha has dual citizenship and dual residency in Nigeria and the United States. Onuoha married Ugonna Osoka of Item in 1992, who works as a chaplain at Children's Medical Center in Dallas. Agnes, Jane, and Isaac are Ugonna and Onuoha's three children.
