= Obinna Oriaku =

Nigerian politician

Obinna Oriaku is a Nigerian politician who served as the commissioner for finance of Abia State from 2015 to 2019 under the governorship of Okezie Ikpeazu. In 2025, Oriaku was appointed as a commissioner representing Abia State in the Federal Character Commission by President Bola Tinubu.
