= Gregory University =

Private university in Abia State, Nigeria

- Motto: Knowledge for tomorrow
- Type: Private
- Established: 2012
- Founder: Gregory Ibe
- Chancellor: Gregory Okechukwu Ibe
- Vice-Chancellor: Prof. C. U Njoku
- Students: 2000+
- Location: Uturu, Abia State, Nigeria; 5.83155693°N 7.41892274°E
- Campus: Urban
- Location within Nigeria

Gregory University (GUU) is located in Uturu, Abia State in Nigeria. It is a private University named after Pope Gregory I.

== History ==
The Gregory University is a Christian private university that was established in 2012 with approval from National Universities Commission (NUC).

== Administration and governance ==
Gregory University is a private Catholic university located in Uturu, Abia State, Nigeria. It was established in 2012 by Gregory University Foundation, with a mission to promote excellence in education, ethical values, and service. The governance structure includes a Chancellor, Governing Council, Vice‑Chancellor, and principal officers responsible for academic and administrative leadership.

=== Founder / Chancellor ===
- Rev. Fr. Gregory Ibe – Founder and Chancellor (2012–present), who established the university’s vision and mission and provides ceremonial leadership.

=== Vice‑Chancellors ===
Vice‑Chancellor	Tenure
Prof. Augustine Mbara	2012–2017
Prof. Leo E. Ugwuegbu	2017–2023
Prof. Darlington E. Obodo	2023–present

== Affiliations and partnerships ==
Gregory University is accredited by the National Universities Commission (NUC) of Nigeria.
