= Primary elections in Nigeria =

Primary election in Nigeria

Primary elections in Nigeria are elections or nomination processes usually done before the general election and conducted by political parties in Nigeria to choose their candidate to contest in the general or other public elections. Political parties in Nigeria are gateways for democatically elected leaders to emerge. Primary elections take place before the general election and are regulated by the constitutions and rules of political parties, as well as electoral legislation and regulations issued by the Independent National Electoral Commission (INEC). During the primary election, parties go follow an elimination procedure where they reduce a pool of nominees to just one person who will represent them at the general polls.

== Methods ==
- Direct

In direct primary elections, eligible members of a political party participate directly in the selection of the party's candidate for a particular constituency or elective office. The method therefore involves a wider portion of the party membership than a delegate-based primary. Under the Electoral Act 2022, a party conducting a direct primary was required to use its membership register for the constituency concerned. INEC's 2022 Regulations and Guidelines required political parties to submit the relevant membership register to the Commission before the primary.

- Indirect

This is a candidate selection process in which delegates, rather than the entire party membership, vote to select the party's candidate. Delegates may be elected or otherwise selected according to the rules of the political party.
