= Gregory Ibe =

Nigerian academic and politician (1963–2026)

Personal details
- Born: 10 December 1963 Kaduna, Northern Nigeria, Nigeria
- Died: 18 October 2026 (aged 62)
- Party: All Progressives Grand Alliance (APGA)
- Children: 6
- Occupation: Academic; Industrialist; Politician
- Known for: Founder of Gregory University and Innov8 Hub

Gregory Ikechukwu Ibe (10 December 1963 – 18 October 2026) was a Nigerian industrialist, academic and politician. He was the founder and Chancellor of Gregory University, Uturu, and the visionary behind Innov8 Hub, a focal point for innovation and startup incubation in Abuja.

== Early life and education ==
Ibe was born in Kaduna, Nigeria on 10 December 1963. He grew up in Uturu in Abia State. Ibe began his career as a businessman before moving into academia. He held a PhD in Management and was a visiting professor at several institutions.

== Career ==
=== Academia and business ===
Ibe is best known for establishing Gregory University in 2012, a private university in Abia State with a focus on practical skills and entrepreneurship. He also founded **Skill 'G' Nigeria Ltd**, a technology company that partners with the Tertiary Education Trust Fund (TETFund) to upgrade science and engineering equipment in Nigerian universities.

In partnership with Israeli technology experts, he established Innov8 Hub in Abuja to facilitate venture creation and technology transfer for Nigerian researchers.

=== Politics ===
Ibe was an active politician in Abia State. He was the governorship candidate for the All Progressives Grand Alliance (APGA) in the 2023 Abia State gubernatorial election.

== Death ==
Ibe died on 18 October 2026, at the age of 62. His death was confirmed in an official statement issued by his family. He was survived by his six children and seven grandchildren.

== See also ==
- Gregory University
- Education in Nigeria
