= Mimi Onuoha =

Nigerian American visual artist and academic

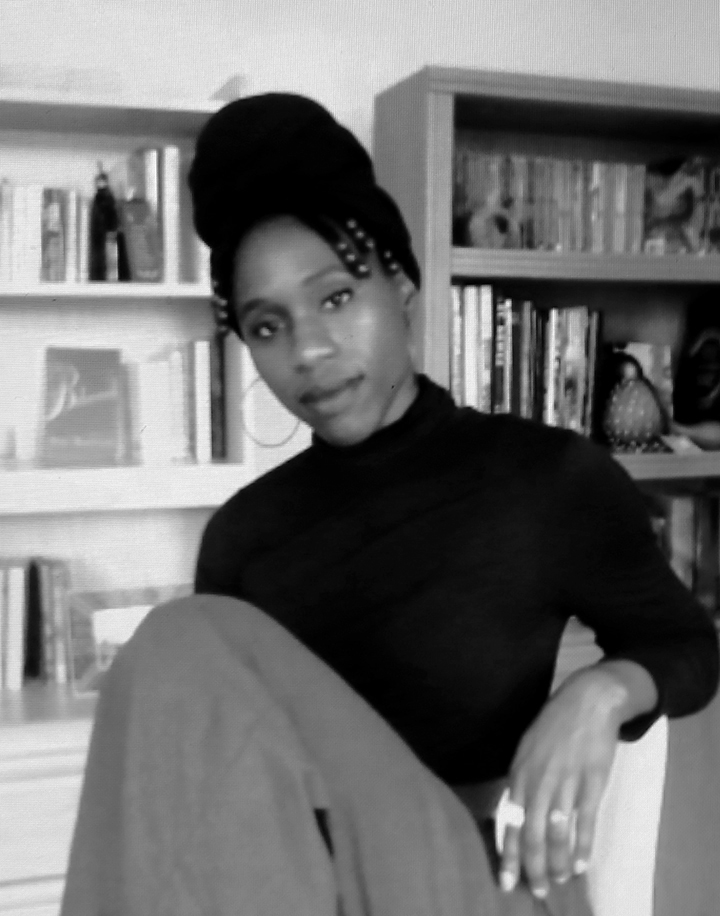
- Education: New York University, Princeton University

Mimi Ọnụọha is a Nigerian American visual artist and academic based in Brooklyn, New York whose work examines the effect of data collection and technology on society.

== Early life and education ==
Ọnụọha was born in 1989 in Parma, Italy, and grew up in Houston, Texas. Ọnụọha majored in anthropology at Princeton University. She earned a master's degree from NYU’s Interactive Telecommunications Program.

== Work ==
Ọnụọha's work, including The Library of Missing Datasets (2016), has explored the idea of "missing datasets," which she describes as "blank holes in otherwise data-saturated systems," such as information about citizen surveillance by the police. These gaps in modern data collection can both harm and help vulnerable communities. Ọnụọha points out that Google Maps lacks map data for Brazil's favelas, leaving out communities where more than a million people live. She is also interested in the effects of artificial intelligence and how people are classified and abstracted by data. Ọnụọha is the co-author of A People's Guide to Tech with Mother Cyborg., an artist-led organization that creates educational guides in the form of zines and hosts workshops about emerging technology. She previously taught at Bennington College. Based in Brooklyn, she is currently an adjunct professor at New York University.

== Exhibitions ==
Ọnụọha's recent solo exhibitions include bitforms gallery and Forest City Gallery. Her work has been featured at the Whitney Museum of Art, the Australian Centre for Contemporary Art, Mao Jihong Arts Foundation, La Gaitê Lyrique, Transmediale Festival, The Photographers Gallery, Gropius Bau, and NEON. Her public art engagements have been supported by Akademie der Kunst, Le Centre Pompidou, the Royal College of Art, the Rockefeller Foundation, and Princeton University.

== Awards and recognition ==
Ọnụọha has been a Fulbright-National Geographic Fellow and an artist in residence at Eyebeam Center for Art & Technology, Studio XX, Data & Society Research Institute, Columbia University’s Tow Center, and the Royal College of Art.

== Writing ==
Ọnụọha has written articles in publications such as Quartz, FiveThirtyEight, the Knight Foundation, and National Geographic. She has also written essays published in The Are.na Annual, FiveThirtyEight, and Nichons-Nous Dans L'Internet.
