= Aro Ngwa =

Neighbourhood in Aba, Abia State, Nigeria

Aro Ngwa (mkpọpụta) is an Igbo community in Osisioma Ngwa Local Government Area, in Abia State of Nigeria. It is a suburb of Aba, a commercial centre in the South Eastern part of Nigeria. The nearest major city is Aba in Nigeria.
