= Owen Azubuike =

Anglican bishop in Nigeria

Owen Azubuike (c. 1947 – 18 July 2016) was the Anglican Bishop of Isiala-Ngwa in Aba Province of the Church of Nigeria.

Azubuike was elected as the first Bishop of Isiala-Ngwa on March 4, 2007.

He died on 18 July 2016, aged 69.
