= Emeka Atuma =

Nigerian politician

Emeka Atuma is a Nigerian politician. He has represented Ikwuano/Umuahia Federal Constituency in the Federal House of Representatives.

== Early life ==
Emeka Atuma was born in January 1969. He is a native of Ikwuano Local Government Area in Abia State, Nigeria. He obtained a degree in Engineering from the University of Calabar.

== Political career ==
Atuma's political career began when he was elected to the Federal House of Representatives, representing the Ikwuano/Umuahia Federal Constituency from 2003 to 2007.

In 2023, he ran for the Senate seat representing the Abia Central Senatorial District as a candidate of the All Progressives Congress (APC).

In December 2024, President Bola Tinubu appointed Atuma as chairman of the South East Development Commission (SEDC), but he was replaced by Emeka Nworgu less than 24 hours after the appointment.
