= Osisioma Ngwa =

- LGA and town
- Interactive map of Osisioma Ngwa
- Location within Nigeria
- Coordinates: 5°8′59″N 7°19′49″E
- Country: Nigeria
- State: Abia State

Area
  - Total: 198 km^{2} (76 sq mi)

Population (2006)
  - Total: 220,662
  - Density: 1,110/km^{2} (2,890/sq mi)
- Time zone: UTC+1 (WAT)
- Postal code: 451

Osisioma Ngwa is a Local Government Area of Abia state of Nigeria. Its headquarters are located in Osisioma town.

It has an area of 198 km^{2} (76 sq mi) and a population of 219,632 as per 2006 census data of Nigeria.

== Geography/Climate ==
Osisioma Ngwa is a flat land without hills or mountains and has a headwater located at Okpu Umuobo that runs through the thick forest cutting across into the city of Aba River waterside in Ogbor Hill. The river is a tributary of the Imo River located in the Southern part of Nigeria. Osisioma Ngwa shares boundaries with Ukwa West and Ugwunagbo in the South, Aba South Local Government Area and Aba North Local Government Area in the East, Isiala Ngwa South Local Government Area in the North and Omuma Local Government Area, Rivers State in the West.

Aba-Port Harcourt Expressway cuts through Osisioma Ngwa with the Aba-Owerri Road running through it from Aba Town Hall down to Olaz Oil filling station.

It has other major routes such as the NNPC depot road which leads to Osisioma Ngwa local government headquarters as well as Osisioma Police Divisional Headquarters, High and Magistrates Court and Ekeakpara market down to Owerrinta the boundary between Abia State and Imo State.

=== Cloud cover ===
Over the course of the year, Osisioma's average percentage of cloud-covered sky varies significantly by season.

In Osisioma, the clearer portion of the year lasts for 2.6 months, starting around November 24 and ending around February 12.

December is the clearest month of the year in Osisioma, with 39% of the sky being clear, mostly clear, or partly overcast on average.

Beginning about February 12 and lasting 9.4 months, the cloudier portion of the year ends around November 24.

In Osisioma, April is the cloudiest month of the year, with 88% of the sky being cloudy or partly cloudy on average.

=== Autonomous communities ===
Community leadership in Osisioma Ngwa is designated on the Traditional Ruler popularly called "Eze" which means King. The Eze is a person widely perceived to represent a community in its traditional religion and socio-economic development. The position of a traditional ruler is not hereditary and is subjected to the democratic process of nomination, selection, appointment and coronation of the eligible candidate among peers who contested for the post by the state Governor.

Various towns in Osisioma Ngwa LGA are divided into Autonomous communities which are spearheaded by a traditional ruler and they are as follows:

- OTUOBI: Umuigbe, Umuokwaa, Umuokereke, Umugwu, Umuodu, Ovoro, Umuadiele, Umuehehe, Umuogwe, Umuokorocha and others.
- ISIALA OSOKWA: Umuokereugo, Umuokere, Umuosi, Umuagwa, Umuohuonu, Umuegbe, Umuelekwa, Umuokpoo.
- MBUTUOMA: Mbutu Umugaa, Mbutu Isi Ahia, Mbutu Umuejije, Umuochuala.
- IBEKU NGWA AMAISE: Okoro, Nkali, Ugwuala, Agwu, Akiri.
- MGBOKO UMUETTE: Umuikocha, Umuabuwa, Umuonyeichi, Umuelele, Umuafara, Osusu-Umuenyioma.
- AMUZU UMUNNEOKPU: Umuobasi-Ukwu, Njara Ukwu, Umuasomaji, Mbutu Ukazi, Umunwajere, Umuafornjara, Umunwankwougwu, Umuagbam.
- ISIALA OKPU: Amaiyi, Umuadiele, Ebere na Onwu, Umuodu, Umunwogu, Umunkarugbara, Umuagbam.
- AHIABA ALAOCHA: Amaugba, Umuonyembi, Umuamadi, Umuogine, Amawom, Umuekeji.
- OKPUALA UMUGWOR: Umuokwukwe, Umule, Umuokorocha, Umuajienyi, Umuiroma, Umuwomada, Umuadikwuru, Umunwokocha.
- ASA AMANO: Umuogba, Umuaja, Umuanyaonwu, Umuekeme, Asa Umudioka, Asa Amoka, Asa Oberete.
- ODE UKWU: Umunkwocha, Umuagwu, Okpokoroala, Umunwankwo, Osokoro, Umuobia, Umuoru, Umunwankwo Diokpa, Ichi, Umunwarie.
- AMATOR: Umuagbai, Umugwu, Amaogwugwu, Umule, Umuokoro-ukwu, Umuakatta, Umueneregbe, Umuchima, Umuagwu.
- NJIKO UMUNNA: Egbelu-Umuegoro, Umukaegbu, Umugwo, Umungwaba, Umunwakwo Asonye, Ugboekpe, Umuogbaraegbe, Umuaduru, Umuoru, Umuokoroafor, Umuihudinma, Umuogogo.
- AMASATO: Umungasi, Umuchichi, Umule.
- ARO-NGWA: Umuohia, Umuonyeukwu, Umuejie, Umuotutu, Umuarakpa.
- ETITI AMAVO: Umuegoro, Ule Nwaghinna, Umunwangwa, Umuosouhie, Umuokereke, Umunkaru, Umuonwunata, Umuchima.
- UMUKA ARO: Umuevo, Umunkoro, Umuokorouka, Umuevuka, Umuama, Umuangara, Umuekpele, Umunwabughiogu, Umuogbonna.

== Institutions of learning ==
- Ngwa High School is a school in Abayi.

Osisioma does not have any State or Federal government institution of higher learning, college or university despite its large population and size.

== Postal code ==
The postal code of the area is 451.

== Notable people ==
=== Business ===
- Dr Emmanuel Adaelu – The Chairman/CEO of Chemlap Nigeria Limited
- Prince Sunny Aku – CEO of Novena Majesty Furniture
- Chidi Onyeukwu Ajaegbu – former president of ICAN

=== Politics ===
- Late Chief Dr Clement Chima Nwafor, former deputy of Abia State
- Late Group Captain Monday Ikpeazu, former Sole Administrator of Anambra State
- Chief Allen Nwachukwu, former chairman of Osisioma Ngwa LGA
- Chief Chukwuemeka Eneogwe, former chairman of Osisioma Ngwa LGA
- Engr. Solomon Adaelu, politician
- Senator Nkechi Justina Nwaogu, politician

=== Entertainment ===
- Nkiru Sylvanus – Nollywood actress

== See also ==
- List of villages in Abia State
