= 1992 Nigerian Senate elections in Abia State =

1992 Nigerian Senate election in Abia State

The 1992 Nigerian Senate election in Abia State was held on July 4, 1992, to elect members of the Nigerian Senate to represent Abia State. Emmanuel Chiedoziem Nwaka representing Abia North and Onyeka Amadi Okoroafor representing Abia Central won on the platform of National Republican Convention, while Mac Onyemachi Nwulu representing Abia South won on the platform of the Social Democratic Party.

== Overview ==
Affiliation	Party		Total
Affiliation	SDP	NRC	Total
Before Election			3
After Election	1	2	3

== Summary ==
District	Incumbent	Party	Elected Senator	Party
Abia North			Emmanuel Chiedoziem Nwaka	NRC
Abia Central			Onyeka Amadi Okoroafor	NRC
Abia South			Mac Onyemachi Nwulu	SDP

== Results ==
=== Abia North ===
The election was won by Emmanuel Chiedoziem Nwaka of the National Republican Convention.

1992 Nigerian Senate election in Abia State
Party	Candidate	Votes	%
NRC	Emmanuel Chiedoziem Nwaka		
Total votes			
NRC hold			

=== Abia Central ===
The election was won by Onyeka Amadi Okoroafor of the National Republican Convention.

1992 Nigerian Senate election in Abia State
Party	Candidate	Votes	%
NRC	Onyeka Amadi Okoroafor		
Total votes			
NRC hold			

=== Abia South ===
The election was won by Mac Onyemachi Nwulu of the Social Democratic Party.

1992 Nigerian Senate election in Abia State
Party	Candidate	Votes	%
SDP	Mac Onyemachi Nwulu		
Total votes			
SDP hold			
