= Anglican Diocese of Isiala-Ngwa =

Anglican diocese in Nigeria

Coordinates: 5°22′N 7°25′E

The Anglican Diocese of Isiala-Ngwa (l is one of nine dioceses within the Anglican Province of Aba, itself one of 14 ecclesiastical provinces within the Church of Nigeria: bishops of the diocese include the late Owen Azubuike and the current incumbent the Right Rev. Temple Nwaogu.
