= Martins Azubuike =

Nigerian politician (born 1969)

5th Speaker of the Abia State House of Assembly
- In office 11 June 2015 – 30 December 2016
- Governor: Okezie Ikpeazu
- Succeeded by: Kennedy Njoku

Personal details
- Born: 16 July 1969 (age 57) Abia State, Nigeria
- Party: PDP

Martins Azubuike // is a Nigerian politician who served as the 5th Speaker of the Abia State House of Assembly after he was elected on June 11, 2015. He had previously served as a Member of the House, representing Isiala Ngwa North Constituency. He was succeeded as Speaker by Kennedy Njoku following his impeachment by members of the House.
