= 2019 Abia State House of Assembly election =

The 2019 Abia State House of Assembly election was held on March 9, 2019, to elect members of the Abia State House of Assembly in Nigeria. All the 24 seats were up for election in the Abia State House of Assembly.

Upon the opening of the 7th State House of Assembly, Chinedum Orji (Umuahia Central) was elected as Speaker of the House while Ifeanyi Uchendu (PDP-Ohafia South) and Solomon Akpulonu (PDP-Obingwa East) became Deputy Speaker and House Leader, respectively.

== Results ==
=== Aba Central ===
A total of 19 candidates registered with the Independent National Electoral Commission to contest in the election. APGA candidate Abraham Oba won the election, defeating PDP Sunday Maduako and 17 other party candidates. Oba got 6,268 votes, while his closest rival got 4,331.

2019 Abia State House of Assembly election
Party	Candidate	Votes	%
APGA	Abraham Oba	6,268	
PDP	Sunday Maduako	4,331	
Others			
Total votes			100%
APGA hold			

=== Aba North ===
A total of 21 candidates registered with the Independent National Electoral Commission to contest in the election. PDP candidate Uzodike Aaron won the election, defeating APGA Nwagwu Araraka and 19 other party candidates.

2019 Abia State House of Assembly election
Party	Candidate	Votes	%
PDP	Uzodike Aaron	5,466	
APGA	Sunday Maduako	5,263	
Others			
Total votes			100%
PDP hold			

=== Aba South ===
A total of 20 candidates registered with the Independent National Electoral Commission to contest in the election. APGA candidate Obinna Ichita Martin won the election, defeating PDP Clinton Ebere and 18 other party candidates.

2019 Abia State House of Assembly election
Party	Candidate	Votes	%
APGA	Obinna Ichita Martin	4,428	
PDP	Clinton Ebera	2,905	
Others			
Total votes			100%
APGA hold			

=== Arochukwu ===
A total of 18 candidates registered with the Independent National Electoral Commission to contest in the election. APGA candidate Onyekwere M.Ukoha won the election, defeating PDP Eric Kalu and 16 other party candidates.

2019 Abia State House of Assembly election
Party	Candidate	Votes	%
APGA	Onyekwere M.Ukoha	6,223	
PDP	Eric Kalu	4,783	
Others			
Total votes			100%
APGA hold			

=== Bende North ===
A total of 15 candidates registered with the Independent National Electoral Commission to contest in the election. APC candidate Chukwu Chijioke won the election, defeating PDP Cosmos Ndukwe and 13 other party candidates.

2019 Abia State House of Assembly election
Party	Candidate	Votes	%
APC	Chukwu Chijioke	6,161	
PDP	Cosmos Ndukwa	3,832	
Others			
Total votes			100%
All Progressive Congress hold			

=== Bende South ===
A total of 18 candidates registered with the Independent National Electoral Commission to contest in the election. PDP candidate Emmanuel C. Ndubuisi won the election, defeating APC Chibuzor Okogbhua and 16 other party candidates.

2019 ABIA State House of Assembly election
Party	Candidate	Votes	%
PDP	Emmanuel C. Ndubuisi	4,426	
APC	Chibuzor Okogbhua	4,415	
Others			
Total votes			100%
PDP hold			

=== Ikwuano ===
A total of 18 candidates registered with the Independent National Electoral Commission to contest in the election. PDP candidate Stanley Nwabuisi won the election, defeating APC Nwaka Emma and 16 other party candidates.

2019 ABIA State House of Assembly election
Party	Candidate	Votes	%
PDP	Stanley Nwabuisi	6,122	
APC	Nwaka Emma	5.074	
Others			
Total votes			100%
PDP hold			

=== Isiala Ngwa South ===
A total of 12 candidates registered with the Independent National Electoral Commission to contest in the election. PDP candidate Chikwendu Kalu won the election, defeating APGA Levi Ebere and 10 other party candidates.

2019 ABIA State House of Assembly election
Party	Candidate	Votes	%
PDP	Chikwendu Kalu	19,370	
APGA	Levi Ebere	4,557	
Others			
Total votes			100%
PDP hold			

=== Isiala Ngwa North ===
A total of 12 candidates registered with the Independent National Electoral Commission to contest in the election. PDP candidate Onwusibe Ginger won the election, defeating APC Anaba Ikechukwu and 10 other party candidates.

2019 ABIA State House of Assembly election
Party	Candidate	Votes	%
PDP	Onwusibe Ginger	15,624	
All Progressive Congress	Anaba Ikechukwu	2,491	
Others			
Total votes			100%
PDP hold			

=== Isuikwuato ===
A total of 16 candidates registered with the Independent National Electoral Commission to contest in the election. APC candidate Emeka Okoroafor won the election, defeating PDP Francis Eliezu and 10 other party candidates.

2019 ABIA State House of Assembly election
Party	Candidate	Votes	%
All Progressive Congress	Emeka Okoroafor	9.291	
PDP	Francis Eliezu	4,429	
Others			
Total votes			100%
All Progressive Congress hold			

=== Obingwa East ===
A total of 15 candidates registered with the Independent National Electoral Commission to contest in the election. PDP candidate Solomon Akpulonu won the election, defeating APC Alexander Nwaigwe and 13 other party candidates.

2019 ABIA State House of Assembly election
Party	Candidate	Votes	%
PDP	Solomon Akpulonu	30,306	
All Progressive Congress	Alexander Nwaigwe	1,241	
Others			
Total votes			100%
PDP hold			

=== Obingwa West ===
A total of 15 candidates registered with the Independent National Electoral Commission to contest in the election. PDP candidate Solomon Akpulonu won the election, defeating APC Alexander Nwaigwe and 13 other party candidates.

2019 ABIA State House of Assembly election
Party	Candidate	Votes	%
PDP	Thomas Nkoro	30,306	
All Progressive Congress	Alexander Nwaigwe	1,241	
Others			
Total votes			100%
PDP hold			

=== Ohafia North ===
A total of 15 candidates registered with the Independent National Electoral Commission to contest in the election. PDP candidate Solomon Akpulonu won the election, defeating APC Alexander Nwaigwe and 13 other party candidates.

2019 Abia State House of Assembly election
Party	Candidate	Votes	%
PDP	Egwuronu Obasi	12,507	
All Progressive Congress	Orji Kalu Uka	2,768	
Others			
Total votes			100%
PDP hold			

=== Ohafia South ===
A total of 17 candidates registered with the Independent National Electoral Commission to contest in the election. PDP candidate Ifeanyi Uchendu won the election, defeating APGA Leonard Ema and 15 other party candidates.

2019 Abia State House of Assembly election
Party	Candidate	Votes	%
PDP	Ifeanyi Uchendu	6,228	
All Progressive Grand Alliance	Leonard Ema	4,162	
Others			
Total votes			100%
PDP hold			

=== Osisioma North ===
A total of 15 candidates registered with the Independent National Electoral Commission to contest in the election. PDP candidate Kennedy Njoku won the election, defeating APGA Prince Ekpemo and 13 other party candidates.

2019 Abia State House of Assembly election
Party	Candidate	Votes	%
PDP	Kennedy Njoku Bishop	5,089	
All Progressive Grand Alliance	Prince Ekpemo	1,313	
Others			
Total votes			100%
PDP hold			

=== Igbo Eze North II ===
A total of 10 candidates registered with the Independent National Electoral Commission to contest in the election. PDP candidate Ugwu Innocent Emeka won the election, defeating APC Eze Joel Chukwudi and 8 other party candidates. Emeka received 96.1% of the votes, while Chukwudi received 3.5%.

2019 Enugu State House of Assembly election
Party	Candidate	Votes	%
PDP	Ugwu Innocent Emeka	15,486	96.1%
APC	Eze Joel Chukwudi	572	3.5%
Others		59	0.4%
Total votes		16,117	100%
PDP hold			

=== Udenu ===
A total of 12 candidates registered with the Independent National Electoral Commission to contest in the election. PDP candidate Ezeugwu Ikechukwu won the election, defeating APC Eze Jude Onyenechi and 10 other party candidates. Ikechukwu received 96.6% of the votes, while Onyenechi received 2.9%.

2019 Enugu State House of Assembly election
Party	Candidate	Votes	%
PDP	Ezeugwu Ikechukwu	38,021	96.6%
APC	Eze Jude Onyenechi	1,127	2.9%
Others		220	0.5%
Total votes		39,368	100%
PDP hold			

=== Oji River ===
A total of 13 candidates registered with the Independent National Electoral Commission to contest in the election. PDP candidate Mbah Geoffrey won the election, defeating APC Onyebuchi Michel and 11 other party candidates. Geoffrey received 94.1% of the votes, while Michel received 4.8%.

2019 Enugu State House of Assembly election
Party	Candidate	Votes	%
PDP	Mbah Geoffrey	21,568	94.1%
APC	Onyebuchi Michel	1,108	4.8%
Others		234	1.1%
Total votes		22,910	100%
PDP hold			

=== Nsukka West ===
A total of 8 candidates registered with the Independent National Electoral Commission to contest in the election. PDP candidate Ugwuwerua Emma won the election, defeating APC Ugwuja George and 6 other party candidates. Emma received 96.4% of the votes, while George received 3%.

2019 Enugu State House of Assembly election
Party	Candidate	Votes	%
PDP	Ugwuwerua Emma	30,789	96.4%
APC	Ugwuja George	939	3%
Others		213	0.6%
Total votes		31,941	100%
PDP hold			

=== Nsukka East ===
A total of 13 candidates registered with the Independent National Electoral Commission to contest in the election. PDP candidate Nwamba Christian won the election, defeating APC Omeje Ikpechukwu Evans and 11 other party candidates. Christian received 92.4% of the votes, while Evans received 4.7%.

2019 Enugu State House of Assembly election
Party	Candidate	Votes	%
PDP	Nwamba Christian	17,737	92.4%
APC	Omeje Ikpechukwu Evans	909	4.7%
Others		547	2.9%
Total votes		19,193	100%
PDP hold			

=== Nkanu West ===
A total of 17 candidates registered with the Independent National Electoral Commission to contest in the election. PDP candidate Aniagu Iloabuchi D. won the election, defeating APC Richard Ngene C. and 15 other party candidates. Iloabuchi received 97.3% of the votes, while Ngene received 1.6%.

2019 Enugu State House of Assembly election
Party	Candidate	Votes	%
PDP	Aniagu Iloabuchi D.	30,084	97.3%
APC	Richard Ngene C.	355	1.1%
Others		486	1.6%
Total votes		30,925	100%
PDP hold			

=== Uzo Uwani ===
A total of 11 candidates registered with the Independent National Electoral Commission to contest in the election. PDP candidate Okika Josephat E. won the election, defeating APC Ugwuoke Blessing C. and 9 other party candidates. Josephat received 97.8% of the votes, while Blessing received 1.4%.

2019 Enugu State House of Assembly election
Party	Candidate	Votes	%
PDP	Okika Josephat E.	22,523	97.8%
APC	Ugwuoke Blessing C.	320	1.4%
Others		176	0.8%
Total votes		23,019	100%
PDP hold			

=== Udi South ===
A total of 15 candidates registered with the Independent National Electoral Commission to contest in the election. PDP candidate Eneh Chukwuka won the election, defeating APC Edozie Chukwuedozie Confidence and 13 other party candidates. Chukwuka received 90% of the votes, while Confidence received 3.6%.

2019 Enugu State House of Assembly election
Party	Candidate	Votes	%
PDP	Eneh Chukwuka	14,036	90%
APC	Edozie Chukwuedozie Confidence	562	3.6%
Others		997	6.4%
Total votes		15,595	100%
PDP hold			

=== Udi North ===
A total of 16 candidates registered with the Independent National Electoral Commission to contest in the election. PDP candidate Ugwu Uche won the election, defeating APC Ozongwu Magnus Okwu and 14 other party candidates. Uche received 86.4% of the votes, while Okwu received 6.4%.

2019 Abia State House of Assembly election
Party	Candidate	Votes	%
PDP	Ugwu Uche	8,903	86.4%
APC	Ozongwu Magnus Okwu	656	6.4%
Others		750	7.2%
Total votes		10,309	100%
PDP hold			
