= Ohafia =

- Town and local government area
- Interactive map of Ohafia
- Location in Nigeria
- Coordinates: 5°37′N 7°50′E
- Country: Nigeria
- State: Abia State
- Elevation: 103 m (338 ft)

Population (2022)
  - Total: 358,200
  - Ethnicities: Igbo
- Time zone: UTC+1 (WAT)
- Postcode: 442

Ohafia refers to the town and local government area (LGA) of same name located in present-day Abia State, Nigeria. It is an Igbo-speaking town. The ancestral capital of Ohafia town is the centrally located village of Elu.

The Ohafia Local Government Area is an administrative jurisdiction assigned by the Nigeria Government, which covers the entire villages of Ohafia town and other neighbouring towns such as Abiriba, Nkporo, Amavo, and Aro-Ngwa with its Administrative Headquarters at Ebem Ohafia.

The ancestors of the Ohafia people were renowned as mighty warriors. This aspect of the Ohafia peoples' history remains fundamental to the Ohafia people's sense of identity. The knitted warrior's cap or "leopard cap" (Igbo: Okpu agu) is well known and is an associated product of Ohafia. The Ohafia warrior tradition is embodied in the performance of iri agha.

Ohafia is home to the third largest military base in Nigeria, named Goodluck Jonathan Barracks after Nigeria's former President - Goodluck Jonathan. It houses the headquarters of the newly established 14 Brigade and 145 Battalion office complex of the Nigerian Army.

Ohafia encompasses twenty-six villages with population strength ranging between 300,000 and 400,000 as of 2022. And it is at a distance of 50.1 km away from the capital city Umuahia in Abia State. The villages in Ohafia are: Elu, Ibina (Ihenta), Nde Okala, Nde Anyaorie, Amuma, Amaekpu, Ebem, Nde Amogu, Okagwe, Nde Uduma Ukwu, Oboro, Nde Nku, Nkwebi, Amuke, Asaga, Ndi Uduma Awoke, Amankwu, Nde Ibe, Nde Orieke, Okon-aku, Amangwu, Ufiele, Eziafor, Abia, Akanu and Isiugwu.

== Geography and climate ==
The typical temperature in Ohafia Local Government Area is 27 degrees Celsius or 80 degrees Fahrenheit. With an average humidity of 59 percent, the region experiences two different seasons: the dry season and the rainy season. Ohafia Local Government Area is located in a region with a tropical savannah climate.

Situated at an altitude of 103.0 metres (337.93 feet) above sea level, Ohafia experiences a Tropical monsoon climate (Designation: Am). The area's annual temperature averages at 30.82 °C (87.48 °F), which is slightly 1.36% higher than the national averages in Nigeria. Ohafia usually receives approximately 294.96 millimetres (11.61 inches) of rainfall with 284.21 rainy days, accounting for 77.87% of the year.

== Economy ==
In Ohafia Local Government Area, trade is a significant economic activity. The region is home to various marketplaces, including the Amavo central market, where a wide variety of goods are bought and sold. The Local Government Area's residents are primarily agrarians, growing products including yam, cassava, melon, and vegetables there in significant amounts. The residents of Ohafia Local Government Area also work in the fields of food processing, blacksmithing, and wood carving.

== Localities ==
Villages and Towns.

- Nkporo
- Okon-Aku
- Amangwu-Ohafia
- Ohofor-Ohafia
- Oma-Ohafia
- Ebem-Ohafia
- Aro Ngwa
- Amasa
- Oso-Akwa
- Ama-Asato
- Amavo
- Umunneise
- Isiama-Ohafia
- Nbem-Ohafia
- Abiriba

== Notable people ==
- Chinedu Obasi,former super eagles and schalke fc of Germany player
- Uma Ukpai, a Christian leader, an international evangelist, and preacher from Nigeria
- Ogbugo Kalu, former army officer who served in both the Nigerian Army and Biafran Army
- Eni Njoku, first black vice chancellor of University of Lagos and University of Nigeria Nsukka. The pioneer professor of botany in Nigeria.
- Ruggedman, Afro-rap artiste
- Ezinne Kalu, Female Basketball player
- J. Martins, Afro-pop artiste
- Ike Nwachukwu, military officer, former governor of old Imo state, diplomat and former senator
- Ebitu Ukiwe, military officer, former military governor of Lagos state and Niger State, former chief of general staff (de facto vice president) to General Babangida's military government
- Kalu Idika Kalu is a former finance minister of Nigeria, minister of national planning and transportation minister. He served twice as the minister of finance. He was a presidential aspirant in the 2003 Nigeria general elections, of the Federal Republic of Nigeria, under the platform of The New Nigeria Peoples Party (NNPP).
- Chief Ojo Maduekwe, a former minister of culture and tourism (1999), minister of transportation (2000–2003), minister of foreign affairs (2007–2010 and national secretary to the People Democratic Party.
- Chief Umeh Kalu, He served as the Attorney General of Abia State and Commissioner for Justice of Abia State. Office: Attorney General of Abia State (Since 2007), Previous office: Attorney General of Abia State (2009 - 2019), Education: Nigerian Law School · Imo State University.
- Ude Oko Chukwu, former deputy Governor Abia State (2015 - 2023), former speaker 5th Abia state house of Assembly.
