= Uche Ogah =

Nigerian businessman and politician

Personal details
- Born: Uchechukwu Sampson Ogah; December 22, 1969 (age 56) Abia State
- Citizenship: Nigerian
- Spouse: Ngozi Ogah
- Education: University of Nigeria Nsukka, University of Lagos, Institute of Management Technology Enugu, Ogun State University
- Occupation: Politician, Businessman, President (Master Energy Group)
- Website: www.mastersenergygroup.com

Uchechukwu Sampson Ogah// (born 22 December 1969) is a Nigerian business magnate, investor and philanthropist who served as Minister of State for Mines and Steel Development during the presidency of Muhammadu Buhari. He is the founder of Master Energy Group, a conglomerate with over 15 subsidiaries and interests across a variety of industries. Ogah holds the Nigerian national honours, the Officer of the Order of the Niger (OON) and the Commander of the Order of Niger (CON).

== Early life and education ==
Ogah was born to Chief Wilson, a sanitary inspector and retired railway staff and Ezinne Pauline Ogah of Onuaku Uturu, Isuikwuato Local Government Area of Abia State.

== Family life and career ==
Ogah is married to Ngozi Sabina Ogah, a financial analyst. Ogah spent 10 years in the banking sector. He started with his National Youth Service at NAL Bank PLC. Thereafter, he took up full employment at All States Trust Bank and spent about two years in the bank before joining Zenith Bank in 1997, where he rose to the position of Assistant General Manager (AGM) before resigning in 2007.

== Philanthropy ==
He is said to have electrified villages in Uturu Community, built prototypal houses for the entire community and also constructed a 5,000 capacity auditorium in Abia state University (ABSU) Uturu.

== Politics ==
Ogah has contested for the seat of the governor of Abia state, thrice, first under the Peoples Democratic Party and the ruling All Progressives Congress.

Ogah was nominated for ministerial appointment by President Muhammadu Buhari on July 23, 2019 along with 42 other nominees. During his senatorial screening on July 24, he narrated his plans on how to work on Nigerian refineries as well as his plans for the Nigerian currency rate. Ogah was confirmed for ministerial appointment by the Senate on July 30 and on August 21, 2019 was confirmed and sworn in as the Minister of State for Mines and Steel Development.
