= Ukwa West =

- LGA
- Interactive map of Ukwa West
- Coordinates: 4.9884°N 7.2425°E
- Country: Nigeria
- State: Abia State
- Capital: Oke Ikpe

Area
  - Total: 271 km^{2} (105 sq mi)

Population (2006)
  - Total: 87,367
  - Density: 322/km^{2} (835/sq mi)
- Time zone: UTC+1 (WAT)
- National language: Igbo

Ukwa West is a Local Government Area in Abia State, Nigeria. Its headquarters is in the town of Oke Ikpe.

It has an area of 271 km^{2} and a population of 88,555 at the 2006 census.

The postal code of the area is 452.

Ukwa west is bounded to the north by Osisioma local government area, to the north-east by Ugwunagbo local government area and to the east by Ukwa East local government area, all in Abia State. It is also bounded to west by Omuma local government area, to the south-west by Etche local government area, and to the south by Oyigbo local government area, all in Rivers State.

== Climate ==
The overall area of Ukwa West LGA is 271 square kilometres or 105 square miles, and its average annual temperature is 26 degrees Celsius or 80 degrees Fahrenheit. The average humidity in the LGA is 71 percent, and the region is home to a variety of rivers and streams. In Ukwa West LGA, the estimated average wind speed is 10 km/h or 6 mph.

== Economy ==
The local government is the only crude oil producing area in Abia state. Its oil-producing communities include: Owaza, Uzuaku, Umuokwor, Umuahala and Umuorie, amongst others.

The local government is divided into three main political groups; Ipu Group, Asa Group and Ozar Group. It practices what is called rotational leadership. Ipu West is one of the political Wards in it. Though it is one the crude oil producing area in Abia State some of its communities and wards lack basic amenities like good roads, electricity, good health centres and schools. Asa and Ogwe group, including Asa North Wards and ozar, are lacking roads and security. Though, there exist economic hubs in almost all the towns. Example is the Afor Ogwe Market.

Asa people are predominantly farmers, with subsistence agriculture being the major practice, while small forms of commercial farming is also done. The main crop farmed in this area is Cassava, which is processed into garri, and consumed at home or sold in markets. The second important food crop is Yam, while Other crops like Groundnut, Maize, and Plantain are commonly farmed. The area is also blessed with palm trees which is processed to produce palm oil, kernel oil and other palm produce for direct consumption or trade.

Animals are also reared in this area, with goat and chicken being the most common. These are either for food or traded in the markets.

== Language ==
The People of Ukwa West local government belong to the Asa clan and speak a dialect of Igbo language known as Asa. Asa is spoken mostly in the southern part of Abia state and Northern Rivers state. In Abia state it is spoken in the entire Ukwa West Local Government Area, while in Rivers State, it is spoken in Oyigbo (Obigbo) Local Government Area in communities such as Mmirinwanyi Asa, Kom Kom, Oboama Asa, Uzuoma Asa, etc.

== Locality ==
Villages and towns in Ukwa West include:

- Ozar-Ukwu
- Ozar West
- Ipu-South
- Ipu-East
- Ipu-West
- Asa-South
- Obokwe
- Asa-North
