= Umunneochi =

Coordinates: 5.9857°N 7.4023°E

Umunneochi Nneochi Umunneochi
- Local Government Area
- Interactive map of Umunneochi
- Country: Nigeria
- State: Abia State
- Capital: Nkwoagu

Government
  - Type: Democracy

Area
  - Total: 368 km^{2} (142 sq mi)

Population (2006)
  - Total: 163,119
  - Density: 443/km^{2} (1,150/sq mi)
- Time zone: UTC+1 (WAT)
- Postal code: 441

Umu-Nneochi or Umunneochi// is a Local Government Area (LGA) in Abia State, Nigeria.

Officially known as "Nneochi", Umunneochi is made up of three major septs: Umuchieze, Nneato, and Isuochi. The major towns of Umunneochi are Umuelem, Ndiawa, Amuda, Umuaku, Achara, Lomara, Ngodo-ukwu, Lokpaukwu, Leru, Lomara Lokpanta, Lekwesi and Mbala. These towns have been repeatedly reorganized. The paramount traditional ruler of isuochi is Eze G I Ezekwesiri, the Ochi 1 of Isuochi, while the federating autonomous communities are governored by Ndi-Eze.

Umunneochi headquarters is in the administrative town of Nkwoagu, Isuochi. Nkwoagu is also the administrative capital, which in ancient and modern times were political and administrative rallying points for the Umunneochi autonomous communities.

Umunneochi occupies 368 km^{2} with a population of 163,928, according to the 2006 Nigeria National Census.

== Economy ==
The major occupations include agriculture and granite, quorite, and laterite mining and trading. The main agricultural food crops are cassava, yam, black beans, and cocoyam. The cash crops are palm nuts and cashew nuts. Pottery is another occupation. Nigeria's biggest cattle market is in the Lokpanta area.

The cultivation of agricultural food crops such cassava, yam, black beans, cocoyam, as well as black-smitting, is the main occupation within the local government. Additionally, they take part in regional stone mining activities with a focus on stones, clay, and pottery production.

== Geography ==
With a total area of 368 square kilometres or 142 square miles and an average temperature of 27 degrees Celsius or 81 degrees Fahrenheit, Umunneochi LGA is quite large. The LGA experiences two distinct seasons, the dry and the wet, with an estimated average wind speed of 10 km/h (6.2 mph). It has a normal tropical climate with two distinct seasons.

== Infrastructure ==
Spiritan University owned by the Catholic Church is located in Ngodo Isuochi in Umunneochi LGA. There are also other public and private schools in the local government.

== Notable people ==
- Uche Chukwumerije
- Nkiruka Onyejaocha
- Giant Alakuku
- Ike Ibeabuchi
- Mathew Ibe
- Stephanie Okechukwu
