= Ugwunagbo =

- Local Government Area
- Ugwunagbo
- Interactive map of Ugwunagbo
- Location of Ugwunagbo in Nigeria
- Coordinates: 4°59′4.1053″N 7°19′32.82″E
- Country: Nigeria
- State: Abia State

Area
  - Total: 108 km^{2} (42 sq mi)

Population (2011)
  - Total: 97,710
  - Density: 905/km^{2} (2,340/sq mi)
- Time zone: UTC+1 (WAT)
- Postal Code: 453120

Ugwunagbo is a Local Government Area (LGA) in Abia State, located in the southeastern region of Nigeria. It shares boundaries with Aba South, Obingwa, and Ukwa East Local Government Areas, and serves as part of the greater Aba metropolitan area, making it an important suburban and peri-urban community. The headquarters of the LGA is situated in Ugwunagbo.

Covering an area of approximately 108 square kilometers, Ugwunagbo had a recorded population of 97,710 during the 2006 National Census, though projections based on growth trends suggest a significantly higher population today. The Igbo people predominantly inhabit the area, and the native language is Igbo, while English is widely used in administration and education.

Ugwunagbo is primarily a rural LGA with pockets of urban influence due to its proximity to the commercial hub of Aba. Its economy is largely driven by agriculture, particularly the cultivation of cassava, yam, maize, and vegetables, alongside livestock farming. Some residents also engage in petty trading and small-scale manufacturing, benefiting from the economic spillover of the nearby Aba industrial zones.

== Economy ==
Ugwunagbo Local Government Area is predominantly agrarian, with a majority of its residents engaged in subsistence, smallholder farming, and livestock production. The area is known for the cultivation of yam, cassava, maize, vegetables, cocoa, and oil palm, which are major staples and cash crops in southeastern Nigeria. These agricultural products are frequently supplied to Aba, Port Harcourt, and neighbouring urban centers, contributing to the region's food security and market economy.

The presence of agricultural cooperatives in the area has been found to significantly enhance farm income, farm size, and overall output among members, according to a comparative study by Okoro et al. (2023). The study showed that farmers who belonged to cooperatives outperformed non-members in key productivity indicators, though non-members showed slightly higher productivity per hectare, possibly due to differences in resource utilization.

In addition to agriculture, small-scale businesses play a modest but vital role in the local economy. However, these enterprises face varying and persistent challenges such as lack of capital, insufficient income, poor business location, and inadequate managerial skills, as identified in a research study by Onyebu (2021).

While some undeveloped crude oil deposits are believed to exist in the Obuzo area, commercial exploration has not taken off. As such, oil does not yet play a significant role in the local economy. Several semi-urban communities like Obegu, Ngwayiekwe, Ihie, and Asa-Umunka serve as commercial centres where local trade, education, and informal markets are active.

== Geography ==
Ugwunagbo Local Government Area covers approximately 108 square kilometres or 42 square miles and is located in the northwest of Abia State. It shares boundaries with Aba South, Ukwa West, and Obingwa LGAs, and also serves as a semi-rural hinterland to the commercial hub of Aba.

Geographically, Ugwunagbo lies within the Cross–Niger transition forest zone, marked by gently undulating terrain and fertile land. Its approximate coordinates are 5°1'59'' N latitude and 7°19' 59" E longitude, with an average elevation of about 61 metres (200 feet) above sea level. Ugwunagbo just like all other parts of the southeastern region of Nigeria experiences a tropical monsoon climate (Köppen Am), with two distinct seasons:

- A wet (rainy) season that spans from March to October, and
- A dry season that lasts from November to February.

Average annual temperatures hover around 26 °C (79 °F), with monthly fluctuations ranging from 24 °C (75 °F) to 31 °C (88 °F). The area receives an estimated 1,900 to 2,700 mm (75 to 106 in) of rainfall annually, with the wettest months being July to September. Average wind speeds are about 10 km/h (6.2 mph), especially noticeable during the rainy season.

The land is primarily used for agriculture, supported by rich, loamy soil and seasonal streams that drain into larger rivers in the area. Vegetation in the area consists mainly of tropical forest and secondary regrowth, due to prolonged farming activities. Recent land cover studies suggest that Ugwunagbo functions as a net carbon sink, storing more carbon (a total of 58.9 kt, with most of the carbon stored in biomass) than it emits annually, owing to sustained forest and vegetation cover.

== Town ==
- Amaokpu-Umuitiri
- Abayi
- Alaoji
- Akanu
- Umugo
- Umule-Osoamadi
- Umunkama
- Umuod
- Ukebe
- Umuaja
- Umuama-Oke
- Obegu
- Obuzor
- Osusu-Aku
- Ozaa-Umuebukwu
- Umuchukwu
- Asaomumakwa
- Ngwaiyiekwe
- Nngwa
- Amuzu-Amaikoro
- Asa-Amuhi
- Asa-Nnentu
- Asa-Oberie
- Asa-Umunka
- Amaorji
- Amapu-Ukebe
- Amapu-Umodo
- Amavo
