= Umuahia North =

Coordinates: 5.5333°N 7.4833°E

- LGA
- Interactive map of Umuahia North
- Country: Nigeria
- State: Abia State
- Capital: Umuahia

Area
  - Total: 245 km^{2} (95 sq mi)

Population (2022 est)
  - Total: 324,900
  - Density: 1,330/km^{2} (3,430/sq mi)
- Time zone: UTC+1 (WAT)
- Postal code: 440

Umuahia North is a Local Government Area of Abia State, Nigeria. Its headquarters is in the city of Umuahia.

It has an area of 245 km^{2} and a population of 220,660 at the 2006 census.

The postal code of the area is 440.

== Economy ==
The Umuahia North LGA is home to a number of markets that draw many buyers and sellers of various goods, including the Ubani major market and the Industrial market in Azueke Ndume Ibeku. A number of banks, hotels, businesses, as well as government-owned facilities are also located in the LGA.

== Geography ==
The entire area of Umuahia North LGA is 245 km^{2} (95 sq mi), and its average annual temperature is 27 °C or 81 °F. With the average wind speed in the region being 11 km/h (6.8 mph), the LGA experiences two major seasons, the dry and the rainy.

== Created ==
Umuahia North Local Government Area LGA was created in August 1991.

== Localities ==
Umuahia North is made up of five districts and 12 electoral wards. The towns and villages in Umuahia North Local Government include:

- Umuahia
- Umukabia
- Umuawa Alaocha
- Amaogwugwu
- Umuagu
- Umuekwule
- Ofeme
- Amafo Isingwu
- Umuda Isingwu
- Umuoriehi
- Isingwu Okpuala
- Amafo Ihungwu
- Umuokoro
- Umuoka
- Umuda Okorocha
- Nkwoegwu

== See also ==
- List of villages in Abia State
