= Aba North =

- LGA
- Interactive map of Aba North
- Location in Nigeria
- Coordinates: 5°07′30″N 7°22′26″E
- Country: Nigeria
- State: Abia State
- Headquarters at: Eziama Urata

Government
  - Local Government Chairman: Chief Victor Ubani
  - Local Government Deputy Chairman: Mrs. Joy Iwuchukwu

Area
  - Total: 23 km^{2} (8.9 sq mi)

Population (2006 census)
  - Total: 106,844
  - Density: 4,600/km^{2} (12,000/sq mi)
- 3-digit postal code prefix: 450
- ISO 3166 code: NG.AB.AN

Aba North is a Local Government Area in Aba, Abia State, Nigeria. In the year (1991) Aba North local government was created. The headquarters is at Eziama Uratta. It is amongst the local governments that make up Abia South senatorial zone. Aba North is in the South East geopolitical zone of Nigeria. The Igbo ethnic group is predominant in the area. The people of the area are mostly Christians and traditional worshippers with Igbo and English as the commonly spoken languages. Aba North, an integral part of Ngwaland, consists of indigenes and migrants from other parts of the state who reside in Aba for entrepreneurial and other purposes.

The postal code is 450.

== List of Towns and villages in Aba North ==
The towns and villages in Aba North include:

- Ogbor
- ụmụ ọla - egbelu
- ụmụ ọla - Okpulor
- Eziama
- Osusu
- Umuokoji
- uratta.

== Economy ==
Aba North Local government area is home to the popular Ariaria International Market which is one of Africa's biggest markets.

== Geography ==
Aba North has an estimated average temperature of 28 degrees Celsius or 82.4 degrees Fahrenheit and a humidity of 72%. The Local Government Area encompasses an estimated 23 km^{2} in total.
