= Isiala-Ngwa North =

- LGA
- Interactive map of Isiala-Ngwa North
- Country: Nigeria
- State: Abia State
- Capital: Okpuala-Ngwa

Area
  - Total: 283 km^{2} (109 sq mi)

Population (2006)
  - Total: 154,083
  - Density: 544/km^{2} (1,410/sq mi)
- Time zone: UTC+1 (WAT)
- Postal code: 451

Isiala-Ngwa North is a Local Government Area of Abia State, Nigeria. Its headquarters is Okpuala-Ngwa.

It has an area of 283 km^{2} and a population of 153,734 based on the 2006 census.

The postal code of the area is 451.

Some notable people from Isiala-Ngwa North are Jaja Wachuku, the first indigenous Speaker of Nigeria's House of Representatives during the First Republic, and Paul Agbai Ogwuma, a former CEO/MD of Union bank and later governor of the Central Bank of Nigeria.

== Overview ==
Isiala Ngwa North Local Government Area is located within Abia State and borders Ikwuano, Umuahia South Local Government Area, and Isiala Ngwa South Local Government Area.

Within this local government area, representative councilors and a chairman oversee the allocation of resources, governance matters, and revenue collection.

== Climate ==
The Isiala-Ngwa north Local Government Area has an area of 283 square kilometres (109 sq mi), and the average yearly temperature is 27 °C (81 °F). The average humidity and wind speed in the Local Government Area are 65% and 10 kilometres per hour (6.2 mph) respectively.

== Economy ==
Isiala-Ngwa North is a mostly agrarian society, and the LGA grows a variety of crops. The LGA hosts several markets, including the Orie Ntigha, Ahiaeketa, and Mbawsi markets.

== Localities ==
Towns and Villages in Isiala-Ngwa North:

- Ama-Asa
- Amasa-Ntigha
- Amapu-Ntigha
- Ihie
- Ngwa Ukwa
- Nsulu
- Okpuala Ngwa
- Umuoha
- Umuoha

== See also ==
- List of villages in Abia State
