= Aba South =

- LGA
- Interactive map of Aba South
- Location in Nigeria
- Coordinates: 5°06′N 7°21′E
- Country: Nigeria
- State: Abia State
- Headquarters at: Aba

Government
  - Local Government Chairwoman: Emma Emeruwa

Area
  - Total: 89 km^{2} (34 sq mi)

Population (2006 census)
  - Total: 423,852
  - Density: 4,800/km^{2} (12,000/sq mi)
- 3-digit postal code prefix: 450
- ISO 3166 code: NG.AB.AS

Aba South is a Local Government Area in Abia State, located in southeastern Nigeria. It is one of the 17 LGAs that make up the state and forms part of the Aba urban area. Aba South is located in the Abia South senatorial district of Abia State. The LGA shares boundaries with Aba North, Obingwa, and Ugwunagbo LGAs. The administrative headquarters of Aba South is situated in Aba.

The LGA covers an area of approximately 49 square kilometres (19 sq mi) and has a population of 423,852 as of 2006.

The postal code for Aba South is 450.

== Localities ==
Towns and Villages under Aba south are:

- Abaukwu
- Akoli
- Amanfuru
- Ariaria
- Asaeme
- Asaokpuaja
- Eziukwu
- Ihieorji
- Ndiegoro
- Nnentu
- Obuda
- Ohabiam
- Umuagbai
- Umumba
- Umunneise
- Umuogele
- Umuokpoji
- Umuosi

== See also ==
- Aba
- List of villages in Abia State
