= 2023 Abia State House of Assembly election =

2023 House of Assembly election in Abia State, Nigeria

- 11 March 2023

All 24 seats in the Abia State House of Assembly 13 seats needed for a majority
	Majority party	Minority party
Party	PDP	APC
Last election	19	2
Seats before	18	3
Seats after	11	1
	Third party	Fourth party	Fifth party
Party	LP	APGA	YPP
Last election	0	1 (Note: The 2019 elections in the APGA-held constituencies of Arochukwu and Aba South were partially voided and supplementary elections called. Although APGA retained the seats in the supplementary elections, the elections were held in early 2020 so the party's 2019 total is 1 seat.)	0
Seats before	2	1	0
Seats after	10	0	1
Speaker before election
Chinedum Enyinnaya Orji
PDP
Elected Speaker
Emma Emeruwa
LP

The 2023 Abia State House of Assembly election was take place on 18 March 2023, to elect members of the Abia State House of Assembly. The election was held concurrent with the state gubernatorial election as well as twenty-seven other gubernatorial elections and elections to all other state houses of assembly. It was held three weeks after the presidential election and National Assembly elections.

== Electoral system ==
The members of state Houses of Assembly are elected using first-past-the-post voting in single-member constituencies.

== Background ==
In the previous House of Assembly elections, the PDP won a sizeable majority that elected Chinedum Enyinnaya Orji (PDP-Umuahia Central) as Speaker. In other Abia elections, incumbent PDP Governor Okezie Ikpeazu won in a landslide but federal elections were closer as the PDP lost ground by only winning seven House of Representatives seats and two Senate seats compared to all nine House seats and all three Senate seats in 2015. For the presidency, Abia was easily won by PDP nominee Atiku Abubakar with about 68% but still swung towards the APC and had strikingly low turnout.

During the term, a number of defections shifting the main opposition position from APGA to the APC with Chijioke Chukwu (APC-Bende North) becoming Minority Leader in June 2021. Other key events included corruption investigations into Orji and his brief arrest by the EFCC, the formal reprimand of Chukwu for his criticism of Ikpeazu, a court judgement barring MHA Obinna Ichita (APGA-Aba South) from "defamatory statements", an aborted attempt to impeach the Deputy Speaker and Majority Leader, and the resignation of Majority Chief Whip Munachim Alozie (Ugwunagbo) to join the Labour Party.

== Overview ==
Affiliation	Party					Total
Affiliation	PDP	APC	APGA	LP	YPP	Total
Previous Election	19	2	1 (Note: The 2019 elections in the APGA-held constituencies of Arochukwu and Aba South were partially voided and supplementary elections called. Although APGA retained the seats in the supplementary elections, the elections were held in early 2020 so the party's 2019 total is 1 seat.)	0	0	24
Before Election	18	3	1	2	0	24
After Election	11	1	0	10	2	24

== Summary ==
Constituency	Incumbent		Results	
Constituency	Incumbent	Party	Status	Candidates
Aba Central	Abraham Oba	PDP (Note: This House member was elected as a member of APGA but switched to the PDP during their term.)	Incumbent nominated	▌Jane Ogbauta (APC); ▌Matthew Uchechukwu Okorie (APGA); ▌Abraham Oba (PDP); ▌ ✓ Uchenna Stephen Akachukwu
Aba North	Aaron Uzodike	PDP	Incumbent renominated	▌Sampson Uba Omenazu (APC); ▌Charles Chukwundiegwu Atata (APGA); ▌Aaron Uzodike (PDP)
Aba South	Obinna Ichita	APGA	Incumbent retiring	▌Nnabugwu Chimezie Ujoumunna (APC); ▌Ugbor Chukwunonye (APGA); ▌Prince Nwigwe (PDP)
Arochukwu	Onyekwere Mike Ukoha	APC (Note: This House member was elected as a member of APGA but switched to the APC during their term.)	Incumbent nominated	▌Onyekwere Mike Ukoha (APC); ▌Okorafor Ikenna Okorafor (APGA); ▌Austine Emeka Bonny (PDP); ▌ ✓ Uchenna Okoro (LP)
Bende North	Chijioke Chukwu	APC	Incumbent renominated	▌Chijioke Chukwu (APC); ▌Eme Ogbuma Ogbumba (APGA); ▌Nnamdi Ibekwe (PDP)
Bende South	Emmanuel Ndubuisi	PDP	Incumbent renominated	▌Chinedu Kingsley Owa (APC); ▌Elizabeth Ndidiamaka Obioma (APGA); ▌Emmanuel Ndubuisi (PDP)
Ikwuano	Stanley Nwabuisi	PDP	Incumbent renominated	▌Paul Anthony Alaribe (APC); ▌Nduka Izuchukwu Davidson (APGA); ▌Stanley Nwabuisi (PDP)
Isiala Ngwa North	Ginger Obinna Onwusibe	LP (Note: This House member was elected as a member of PDP but switched to the LP during their term.)	Incumbent retiring	▌Alex Chidiebere Chibuikem (APC); ▌Mighty Iyieri Enweremadu (APGA); ▌Ugochukwu Collins Iheonunekwu (PDP)
Isiala Ngwa South	Chikwendu Kalu	PDP	Incumbent retiring	▌Blessing Uwaoma Nwokonneya (APC); ▌Christian Ikechukwu Okeri (APGA); ▌Dennis Rowland Chinwendu (PDP)
Isuikwuato	Emeka Okoroafor	APC	Incumbent renominated	▌Emeka Okoroafor (APC); ▌Emmanuel Akaeme (APGA); ▌Lucky Udoka Nweke-Johnson (PDP)
Obingwa East	Solomon Akpulonu	PDP	Incumbent renominated	▌Valentine Chidire Etonyeaku (APC); ▌Ngozi Daniel Mbonu (APGA); ▌Solomon Akpulonu (PDP)
Obingwa West	A.C. Thomas Nkoro	PDP	Status unknown	▌Prince Onyemereze Adighikachaya (APC); ▌Chibuike Knowledge Nwosu (APGA); ▌Erondu Uchenna Erondu Jnr (PDP)
Ohafia North	Egwuronu Obasi	PDP	Incumbent renominated	▌Otuwe Kalu Oji (APC); ▌Uchenna Onuoha Okocha (APGA); ▌Egwuronu Obasi (PDP)
Ohafia South	Ifeanyi Uchendu	PDP	Incumbent retiring	▌Dike Okoro Uche (APC); ▌Dike Chidozie Okwara (APGA); ▌Ekea Ulu Udensi (PDP)
Osisioma North	Kennedy Njoku	PDP	Incumbent renominated	▌Obioma Ogbonna (APC); ▌Chikezie Prince Ekpemo (APGA); ▌Kennedy Njoku (PDP)
Osisioma South	Nnamdi Allen Nwachukwu	PDP	Incumbent renominated	▌Uwoma Charles Akomas (APC); ▌Sunday Chinagorom Anyanwu (APGA); ▌Nnamdi Allen Nwachukwu (PDP)
Ugwunagbo	Munachim Alozie	LP	Incumbent retiring	▌Chidiadi Ogechi Onyeobia (APC); ▌Nna Henry Ngenyechike (APGA); ▌Chijioke Uruakpa (PDP)
Ukwa East	Paul Taribo	PDP	Status unknown	▌Darlington Ogboda Iwor (APC); ▌Saviour Adiele (APGA); ▌Lewis Chinemerem Obianyi (PDP)
Ukwa West	Godwin Adiele	PDP	Incumbent renominated	▌Ahuruonye Noble Izuchukwu (APC); ▌Ikechukwu Kelechi Nwankwo (APGA); ▌Godwin Adiele (PDP)
Umuahia Central	Chinedum Enyinnaya Orji	PDP	Incumbent retiring	▌Kenneth Maduakolam Adighibe (APC); ▌Chinedu Freeman Obilor (APGA); ▌Ugochukwu Uchegbu (PDP)
Umuahia East	Chukwudi Apugo	PDP	Incumbent retiring	▌Ugochukwu Rowland Ndubuka (APC); ▌Okezie Obasi (APGA); ▌Kelechi Johnson Nwakodo (PDP)
Umuahia North	Kelechi Onuzuruike	PDP	Incumbent retiring	▌Onyediako Chikezie Okwulehie (APC); ▌Ugochukwu Fidelis Ikpo (APGA); ▌Ugochukwu Ezeocha (PDP)
Umuahia South	Jeremiah Ogonnaya Uzosike	PDP	Incumbent renominated	▌Paul Uchechi Uzuegbu (APC); ▌Emmanuel Uwadinachi Egwu (APGA); ▌Jeremiah Ogonnaya Uzosike (PDP)
Umunneochi	Okey Igwe	PDP	Incumbent retiring	▌Ejike Chukwu (APC); ▌Ebere Nwankwo (APGA); ▌Fabian Joseph Nwankwo (PDP)

== See also ==
- 2023 Nigerian elections
- 2023 Nigerian House of Assembly elections
