= 7th Abia State House of Assembly =

←	5th
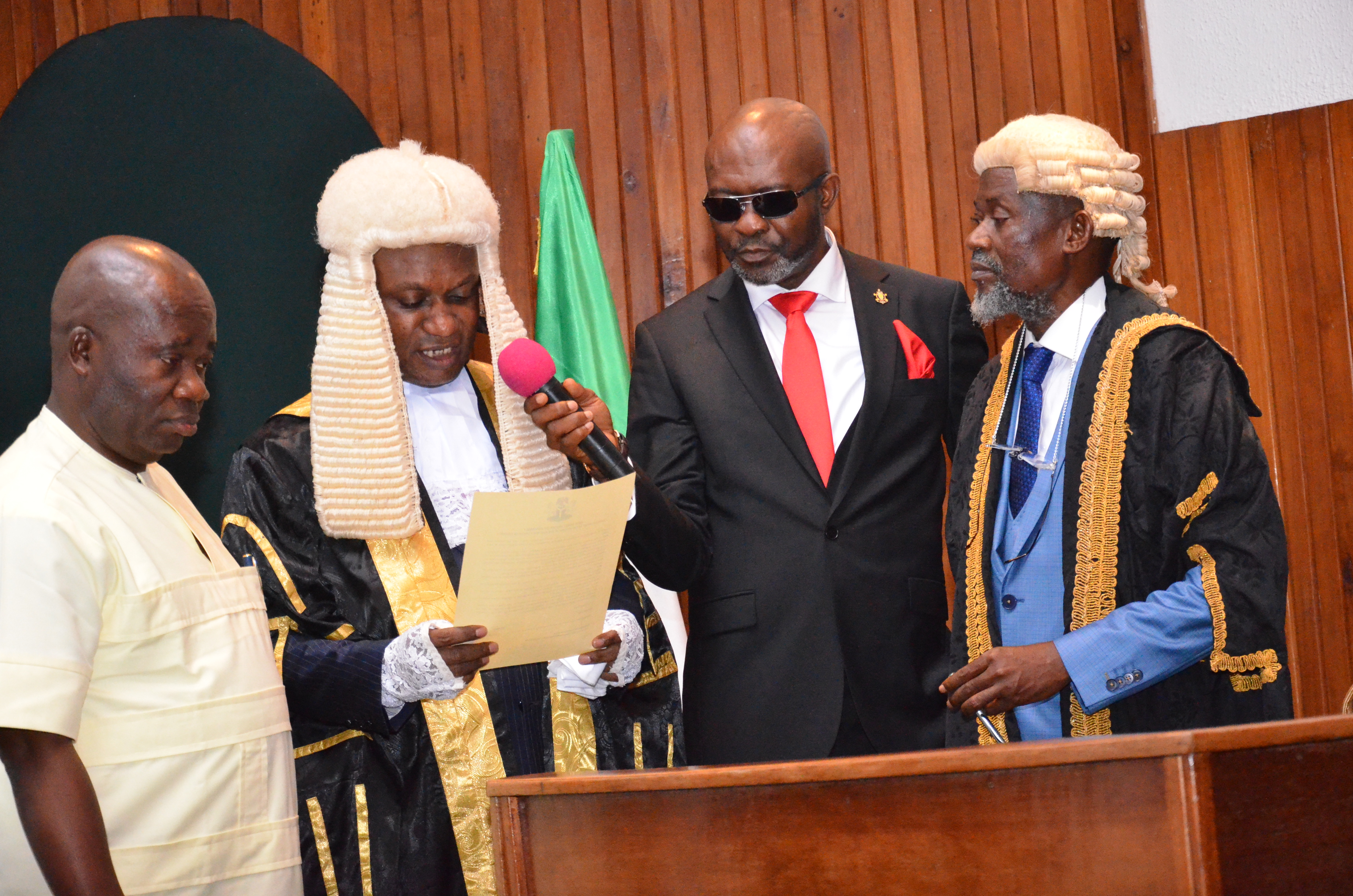
- Rt.Hon Chinedum Enyinnaya Orji taking oath of Office

Overview
- Legislative body: Abia State House of Assembly
- Jurisdiction: Abia State, Nigeria
- Term: 10 June 2019 – 10 June 2023
- Election: 9 March 2019

7th Assembly
- Members: 24
- Speaker: Chinedum Enyinnaya Orji
- Deputy Speaker: Ifeanyi Uchendu
- Majority Leader: Solomon Akpulonu
- Minority Leader: Abraham Oba
- Majority Whip: Munachim Alozie
- Minority Whip: Mike Ukoha

The 7th Abia State House of Assembly was Inaugurated on Monday 10 June 2019 after a Proclamation by the Abia State Governor Dr. Okezie Victor Ikpeazu. Formed after the Governorship and State House of Assembly Elections of Saturday 9 March 2019 and inaugurated on Monday 10 June 2019, the Representatives of the Assembly were elected from 24 constituencies with the majority being members of the People's Democratic Party. The elected Speaker is Chinedum Orji representing Umuahia Central State Constituency.

== Leadership ==
Office	Constituency	Representative	Party
Speaker of the House	Umuahia Central	Chinedum Enyinnaya Orji	PDP
Deputy Speaker	Ohafia South	Ifeanyi Uchendu	PDP
Majority Leader	Obingwa East	Solomon Akpulonu	PDP
Deputy Majority Leader	Ukwa East	Paul Taribo	PDP
Minority Leader	Bende North	Chijioke Chukwu	APC
Deputy Minority Leader	Bende North	Chijioke Chukwu	APC
Majority Whip	Ugwunagbo	Munachim Alozie	PDP
Minority Whip	Arochukwu	Mike Ukoha	APGA

=== Members ===
Constituency	Name	Political party
Osisioma South	Nnamdi Allen	PDP
Umuahia North	Kelechi Onuzuruike	PDP
Umuahia Central	Chinedum Enyinnaya Orji	PDP
Isiala Ngwa North	Ginger Onwusibe	LP
Isiala Ngwa South	Chikwendu Kalu	PDP
Isuikwuato	Emeka Okoroafor	APC
Ukwa East	Paul Taribo	PDP
Ukwa West	Godwin Adiele	PDP
Obingwa East	Solomon Akpulonu	PDP
Umunneochi	Okey Igwe	PDP
Umuahia East	Chukwudi J. Apugo	PDP
Umuahia South	Jeremiah Uzosike	PDP
Ikwuano	Stanley Nwabuisi	PDP
Ugwunagbo	Munachim Alozie	PDP
Obingwa West	Thomas Nkoro	PDP
Ohafia North	Egwuronu Obasi	PDP
Osisioma North	Kennedy A. Njoku	PDP
Aba Central	Abraham Oba	PDP
Aba North	Aaron Uzodike	PDP
Arochukwu	Mike Ukoha	APC
Ohafia South	Ifeanyi Uchendu	PDP
Bende South	Emmanuel Ndubuisi	PDP
Bende North	Chukwu Chijioke	APC
Aba South	Obinna Ichita	APGA
