= Oby Onyioha =

Nigerian singer

- Also known as: Queen of Atrado Rhythms
- Born: Lagos State, Nigeria
- Origin: Nkporo, Abia State, Nigeria
- Genres: Pop
- Occupation: Singer
- Years active: 1981–present
- Website: obyonyioha.co.uk

Oby Onyioha is a Nigerian singer best known for her smash debut single "I Want to Feel Your Love", which was widely successful in the 1980s in Nigeria.

Years after the release of her debut and long hiatus, Onyioha announced her return to the music scene and plans for the release of her 3rd album, 'Break-It' being the second.

== Early life ==
Oby was born in Lagos and brought up in the eastern part of Nigeria. Her father was K. O. K. Onyioha the Head of the Godian Religion. Onyioha began her education in St Stephens Primary School in Umuahia, Abia State from whence she went to Queen's School, Enugu for her high school education. She went on to attain a B.A, B.sc in History and Business Management respectively, she also attained a Masters and Doctorate in Social Anthropology.

== Music career ==
Onyioha first burst onto the Nigerian music scene in 1981 with the release of her first album I Want to Feel Your Love which was named after her hugely successful single of the same title. The single, "I Want to Feel Your Love" is regarded as one of the greatest songs of her era in Nigeria. She was the first artist to sign to Time Communication Limited. The album was written and produced by Lemmy Jackson for Time Communication Limited. The album was a huge success and took the Nigerian music scene by storm in the 1980s and 1990s, all this at a time when disco break-dance music was considered the exclusive domain of western artists Onyioha played a big part in helping to break the perception that music was a vocation for academically challenged women. Oby Onyioha's I Want to Feel Your Love album was so successful that at an auction in Europe, the vinyl record sold for $700.

Her second album 'Break it' was released in 1984. Her songs featured in different compilations including 'Amixtape from Nigeria' released in 2017 by DJ Mix Starfunkel; 'Kin & Amir Present Off Track Volume 111: Brooklyn' released in 2010 by Kon & Amir; 'Brand New Wayo: Funk, Fast Times & Nigerian Boogie Badness 1979 – 1983' released in 2011; 'Doing It in Lagos: Boogie, Pop & Disco in 1980s Nigeria released in 2016 and 'Return to the Mothers' Garden (More Funky Sounds of Female Africa 1971 – 1982)' released in 2019.

More than 3 decades after the release of her debut album, she announced her return to the music scene and plan to release her 3rd album in 2015
