= Ume (disambiguation) =

Ume is a Japanese name for Prunus mume, a species of Asian plum in the family Rosaceae.

Ume may also refer to:

== Japanese Ume (梅; Prunus mume) ==
- Japanese ship Ume, several Japanese ships
- Ume (song), by Shiritsu Ebisu Chūgaku, 2013

== People ==
- Ume Aoki (蒼樹 うめ; born 1981), Japanese manga artist, illustrator and dōjin artist
- Ume Tange (丹下 梅子; 1873–1955), one of the first three women admitted to a Japanese university in 1913
- Ume Kenjirō (梅 謙次郎; 1860–1910), legal scholar and the founder of Hosei University
- Ume Warqa, companion of Muhammad
- Ume Wainetti, the National Coordinator of the PNG Family and Sexual Violence Action Committee (FSVAC)
- Ume Mathias, Nigerian lawmaker
- John Ume, (born 1996) Papua New Guinean amateur boxer
- Ume Matsuzaka, a character from the manga/anime Crayon Shin Chan

== Languages ==
- Umê script, Tibetan writing
- Ume, a dialect of the Isoko language of Nigeria
- Ume, a dialect of the Wipi language, an Eastern Trans-Fly language of Papua New Guinea

== Places ==
- Ume, Ōita, a town in Minamiamabe District, Ōita, Japan
- UME Cinemas, is a Chinese cinema chain
- Ume River, Sweden
- Ume Sami, language of Northern Europe
- Umeå, a Swedish city

== UME (acronym) ==
- Military Emergencies Unit or Emergency Military Unit (Unidad Militar de Emergencias) of the Spanish Armed Forces
- The IATA airport code for Umeå Airport, Alvik, Umeå, Sweden
- Universal Music Enterprises, of Universal Music Group
- Ultramicroelectrode, in electrochemistry

== Other ==
- Ume-Ezeoke
