= 2003 Abia State House of Assembly election =

The 2003 Abia State House of Assembly election was held on May 3, 2003, to elect members of the Abia State House of Assembly in Nigeria. All the 24 seats were up for election in the Abia State House of Assembly.

== Results ==
=== Osisioma South ===
ANPP candidate Donatus Nwankpa won the election.

2003 Abia State House of Assembly election
Party	Candidate	Votes	%
ANPP	Donatus Nwankpa		
ANPP hold			

=== Umuahia North ===
PDP candidate Onyechere Onyeoziri won the election.

2003 Abia State House of Assembly election
Party	Candidate	Votes	%
PDP	Onyechere Onyeoziri		
PDP hold			

=== Umuahia Central ===
PDP candidate Stanley Ohajuruka won the election.

2003 Abia State House of Assembly election
Party	Candidate	Votes	%
PDP	Stanley Ohajuruka		
PDP hold			

=== Isiala Ngwa North ===
PDP candidate Chris Enweremadu won the election.

2003 Abia State House of Assembly election
Party	Candidate	Votes	%
PDP	Chris Enweremadu		
PDP hold			

=== Isiala Ngwa South ===
ANPP candidate Matthew Ochiobi won the election.

2003 Abia State House of Assembly election
Party	Candidate	Votes	%
ANPP	Matthew Ochiobi		
ANPP hold			

=== Isuikwuato ===
PDP candidate Monday Ejiegbu won the election.

2003 Abia State House of Assembly election
Party	Candidate	Votes	%
PDP	Monday Ejiegbu		
PDP hold			

=== Umuahia East ===
PDP candidate Chidiebere Nwoke won the election.

2003 Abia State House of Assembly election
Party	Candidate	Votes	%
PDP	Chidiebere Nwoke		
PDP hold			

=== Umunneochi ===
PDP candidate Matthew Ibeh won the election.

2003 Abia State House of Assembly election
Party	Candidate	Votes	%
PDP	Matthew Ibeh		
PDP hold			

=== Ukwa West ===
PDP candidate Ngozi Ulunwa won the election.

2003 Abia State House of Assembly election
Party	Candidate	Votes	%
PDP	Ngozi Ulunwa		
PDP hold			

=== Ukwa East ===
PDP candidate Asiforo Okere won the election.

2003 Abia State House of Assembly election
Party	Candidate	Votes	%
PDP	Asiforo Okere		
PDP hold			

=== Obingwa East ===
PDP candidate Eric Acho Nwakanma won the election.

2003 Abia State House of Assembly election
Party	Candidate	Votes	%
PDP	Eric Acho Nwakanma		
PDP hold			

=== Obingwa West ===
PDP candidate Uche Nwankpa won the election.

2003 Abia State House of Assembly election
Party	Candidate	Votes	%
PDP	Uche Nwankpa		
PDP hold			

=== Umuahia South ===
ANPP candidate Leonard Onyekwere won the election.

2003 Abia State House of Assembly election
Party	Candidate	Votes	%
ANPP	Leonard Onyekwere		
ANPP hold			

=== Ikwuano ===
PDP candidate Wisdom Ogbonna won the election.

2003 Abia State House of Assembly election
Party	Candidate	Votes	%
PDP	Wisdom Ogbonna		
PDP hold			

=== Ugwunagbo ===
PDP candidate Humphery Azubuike won the election.

2003 Abia State House of Assembly election
Party	Candidate	Votes	%
PDP	Humphery Azubuike		
PDP hold			

=== Ohafia North ===
PDP candidate Ude Oko Chukwu won the election.

2003 Abia State House of Assembly election
Party	Candidate	Votes	%
PDP	Ude Oko Chukwu		
PDP hold			

=== Aba Central ===
PDP candidate Uzor Azubuike won the election.

2003 Abia State House of Assembly election
Party	Candidate	Votes	%
PDP	Uzor Azubuike		
PDP hold			

=== Osisioma North ===
ANPP candidate Kingsley Mgbeahuru won the election.

2003 Abia State House of Assembly election
Party	Candidate	Votes	%
ANPP	Kingsley Mgbeahuru		
ANPP hold			

=== Aba North ===
PDP candidate Blessing Azuru won the election.

2003 Abia State House of Assembly election
Party	Candidate	Votes	%
PDP	Blessing Azuru		
PDP hold			

=== Arochukwu ===
PDP candidate Agwu Ukakwu Agwu won the election.

2003 Abia State House of Assembly election
Party	Candidate	Votes	%
PDP	Agwu Ukakwu Agwu		
PDP hold			

=== Aba South ===
ANPP candidate Cherechi Nwogu won the election.

2003 Abia State House of Assembly election
Party	Candidate	Votes	%
ANPP	Cherechi Nwogu		
ANPP hold			

=== Bende North ===
PDP candidate Lekwauwa Orji won the election.

2003 Abia State House of Assembly election
Party	Candidate	Votes	%
PDP	Lekwauwa Orji		
PDP hold			

=== Bende South ===
PDP candidate Emenike Okoroafor won the election.

2003 Abia State House of Assembly election
Party	Candidate	Votes	%
PDP	Emenike Okoroafor		
PDP hold			

=== Ohafia South ===
PDP candidate Bernard Orji won the election.

2003 Abia State House of Assembly election
Party	Candidate	Votes	%
PDP	Bernard Orji		
PDP hold			
