= 2015 Abia State House of Assembly election =

- April 11, 2015

All 24 seats in the Abia State House of Assembly 13 seats needed for a majority
| | Majority party |
|---|---|
| Leader | Chikwendu Kalu |
| Party | PDP |
| Leader's seat | Isiala Ngwa South |
| Last election | 24 |
| Seats after | 24 |
| Seat change | Steady |
Speaker before election
Ude Oko Chukwu
PDP
Elected Speaker
Chikwendu Kalu
PDP

The 2015 Abia State House of Assembly election was held on April 11, 2015, to elect members of the Abia State House of Assembly in Nigeria. All the 24 seats were up for election in the Abia State House of Assembly.

Upon the opening of the 6th State House of Assembly, Chikwendu Kalu (PDP-Isiala Ngwa South) was elected as Speaker of the House while Cosmos Ndukwe (PDP-Bende North) and Chinedum Enyinnaya Orji (PDP-Umuahia Central) became Deputy Speaker and House Leader, respectively.

== Results ==
=== Osisioma South ===
PDP candidate Emeka Alozie won the election.

2015 Abia State House of Assembly election
| Party | Candidate | Votes | % |
|---|---|---|---|
| PDP | Emeka Alozie | | |
| PDP hold | | | |

=== Umuahia North ===
APGA candidate Kelechi C. Onuzurike won the election.

2015 Abia State House of Assembly election
| Party | Candidate | Votes | % |
|---|---|---|---|
| APGA | Kelechi C. Onuzurike | | |
| APGA hold | | | |

=== Umuahia Central ===
PDP candidate Chinedum Enyinnaya Orji won the election.

2015 Abia State House of Assembly election
| Party | Candidate | Votes | % |
|---|---|---|---|
| PDP | Chinedum Enyinnaya Orji | | |
| PDP hold | | | |

=== Isiala Ngwa North ===
PDP candidate Martins O. Azubuike won the election.

2015 Abia State House of Assembly election
| Party | Candidate | Votes | % |
|---|---|---|---|
| PDP | Martins O. Azubuike | | |
| PDP hold | | | |

=== Isiala Ngwa South ===
PDP candidate Chikwendu Kalu won the election.

2015 Abia State House of Assembly election
| Party | Candidate | Votes | % |
|---|---|---|---|
| PDP | Chikwendu Kalu | | |
| PDP hold | | | |

=== Isuikwuato ===
APGA candidate Uloma Onuoha won the election.

2015 Abia State House of Assembly election
| Party | Candidate | Votes | % |
|---|---|---|---|
| APGA | Uloma Onuoha | | |
| APGA hold | | | |

=== Umuahia East ===
PDP candidate Apugo Chukwudi J. won the election.

2015 Abia State House of Assembly election
| Party | Candidate | Votes | % |
|---|---|---|---|
| PDP | Apugo Chukwudi J. | | |
| PDP hold | | | |

=== Umunneochi ===
APGA candidate Ezekwesiri Ikedi Prince won the election.

2015 Abia State House of Assembly election
| Party | Candidate | Votes | % |
|---|---|---|---|
| APGA | Ezekwesiri Ikedi Prince | | |
| APGA hold | | | |

=== Ukwa West ===
PDP candidate Nwabuani Tonny Mezie won the election.

2015 Abia State House of Assembly election
| Party | Candidate | Votes | % |
|---|---|---|---|
| PDP | Nwabuani Tonny Mezie | | |
| PDP hold | | | |

=== Ukwa East ===
PDP candidate Taribo Paul won the election.

2015 Abia State House of Assembly election
| Party | Candidate | Votes | % |
|---|---|---|---|
| PDP | Taribo Paul | | |
| PDP hold | | | |

=== Obingwa East ===
PDP candidate Solomon Akpulonu won the election.

2015 Abia State House of Assembly election
| Party | Candidate | Votes | % |
|---|---|---|---|
| PDP | Solomon Akpulonu | | |
| PDP hold | | | |

=== Obingwa West ===
PDP candidate Ahuru Ezenma C. T. Nkoro won the election.

2015 Abia State House of Assembly election
| Party | Candidate | Votes | % |
|---|---|---|---|
| PDP | Ahuru Ezenma C. T. Nkoro | | |
| PDP hold | | | |

=== Umuahia South ===
APGA candidate Nwachukwu Chijioke E. won the election.

2015 Abia State House of Assembly election
| Party | Candidate | Votes | % |
|---|---|---|---|
| APGA | Nwachukwu Chijioke E. | | |
| APGA hold | | | |

=== Ikwuano ===
APGA candidate Ugboaja Theophilus O. won the election.

2015 Abia State House of Assembly election
| Party | Candidate | Votes | % |
|---|---|---|---|
| APGA | Ugboaja Theophilus O. | | |
| APGA hold | | | |

=== Ugwunagbo ===
PDP candidate Munachim I. Alozie won the election.

2015 Abia State House of Assembly election
| Party | Candidate | Votes | % |
|---|---|---|---|
| PDP | Munachim I. Alozie | | |
| PDP hold | | | |

=== Ohafia North ===
PDP candidate Egwuonu Oghuru E. Obasi won the election.

2015 Abia State House of Assembly election
| Party | Candidate | Votes | % |
|---|---|---|---|
| PDP | Egwuonu Oghuru E. Obasi | | |
| PDP hold | | | |

=== Aba Central ===
APGA candidate Abraham U. Oba won the election.

2015 Abia State House of Assembly election
| Party | Candidate | Votes | % |
|---|---|---|---|
| APGA | Abraham U. Oba | | |
| APGA hold | | | |

=== Osisioma North ===
PDP candidate Kennedy Njoku won the election.

2015 Abia State House of Assembly election
| Party | Candidate | Votes | % |
|---|---|---|---|
| PDP | Kennedy Njoku | | |
| PDP hold | | | |

=== Aba North ===
APGA candidate Emeka Nnamani won the election.

2015 Abia State House of Assembly election
| Party | Candidate | Votes | % |
|---|---|---|---|
| APGA | Emeka Nnamani | | |
| APGA hold | | | |

=== Arochukwu ===
APGA candidate Luke Onyeani Ukara won the election.

2015 Abia State House of Assembly election
| Party | Candidate | Votes | % |
|---|---|---|---|
| APGA | Luke Onyeani Ukara | | |
| APGA hold | | | |

=== Aba South ===
APGA candidate Emmanuel Clinton Ebere won the election.

2015 Abia State House of Assembly election
| Party | Candidate | Votes | % |
|---|---|---|---|
| APGA | Emmanuel Clinton Ebere | | |
| APGA hold | | | |

=== Bende North ===
PDP candidate Cosmos N. Chukwudi won the election.

2015 Abia State House of Assembly election
| Party | Candidate | Votes | % |
|---|---|---|---|
| PDP | Cosmos N. Chukwudi | | |
| PDP hold | | | |

=== Bende South ===
APGA candidate Okobuo Chibuzor Solomon won the election.

2015 Abia State House of Assembly election
| Party | Candidate | Votes | % |
|---|---|---|---|
| APGA | Okobuo Chibuzor Solomon | | |
| APGA hold | | | |

=== Ohafia South ===
APGA candidate Uchendu Ifeanyi won the election.

2015 Abia State House of Assembly election
| Party | Candidate | Votes | % |
|---|---|---|---|
| APGA | Uchendu Ifeanyi | | |
| APGA hold | | | |
