= Ukah =

Ukah is a surname. Notable people with the surname include:

- Chinonso Ukah (born 1996), Nigerian comedienne, influencer, and actress
- Ugo Ukah (born 1984), Nigerian footballer
- Warren Ukah (born 1985), American soccer player
- Ostenaco (c. 1703–1780), also called Ukah, a Cherokee chief
