= World Veterans Federation =

International veteran organisation

The World Veterans Federation
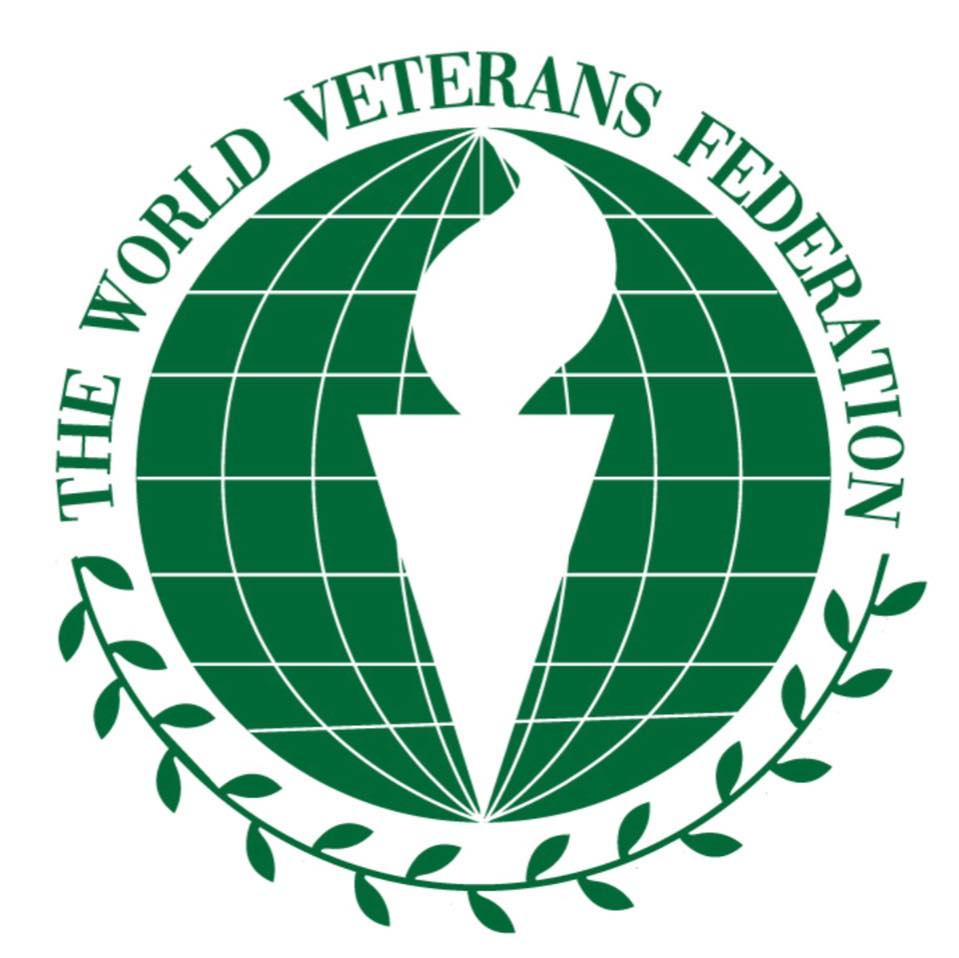
- Predecessor: FIDAC (The Interallied Federation of War Veterans Organisation)
- Formation: 1950
- Location: 1204 Genève, Switzerland
- Region served: Worldwide
- Members: 172 veteran organizations from 121 countries representing some 60 million veterans worldwide
- Official language: English
- Honorary President: Mr. Dan Viggo Bergtun (Norway)
- President: Doctor El Mostafa El Ktiri (Marocco)
- Main organ: Executive Board
- Website: http://www.theworldveterans.org/

The World Veterans Federation (WVF) is the world's largest international veteran organisation. The federation consists of 172 veterans organizations from 121 countries representing some 60 million veterans worldwide.

It is a humanitarian organisation, a charity and a peace activist movement. The WVF maintains its consultative status with the United Nations since 1951 and was conferred the title of "Peace Messenger" in 1987. The WVF was nominated for Nobel Peace Prize 8 times.

== Aims ==
The principal aims of the WVF are to defend the spiritual and material interests of veterans and victims of war and their families by all available legal means and to maintain international peace and security by the application to the letter and in spirit of the Charter of the United Nations and by respecting the human rights and fundamental freedoms set forth in the International Bill of Human Rights.

== History ==
The WVF began on Sunday, 9 June 1946 when six Belgian and French veterans of the First World War gathered around a table at the "Maison du Peuple" in Brussels, Belgium to discuss the possibility of setting up a world association of war veterans. Present at the gathering were two Belgians, Mr. Joseph Neves and Mr. Jules William from the Democratic Union of Veterans, Disabled and War Victims, and four Frenchmen, Mr. Albert Morel from the French Union of Veterans and War Victims Association (UFAC), Mr. G. Imbaud, Mr. G. Jerram and Mr. B. Meunier from the French Workers and Peasants Federation of Veterans.

Following the discussions in Brussels, veterans' organisations in other countries were contacted. On 23 October 1948, a congress attended by representatives from seven countries, namely Belgium, Brazil, France, Italy, the Netherlands, the Union of South Africa and Yugoslavia, adopted a resolution entitled "Setting up of a Provisional Body".

The resolution opened the way for the founding member associations to convene a constitutive assembly which was held at the UNESCO Headquarters in Paris, France, from 23 to 27 November 1950. Forty-three delegates and observers were present. The delegates were from Belgium (6), France (14), Italy (4), Turkey (2), the United States (9) and Yugoslavia (4), and the observers were from Denmark (1) and Finland (3). The founding member associations of the Netherlands and Luxembourg were unable to send their representatives but declared their agreement with the creation of the federation. There was no participation from countries from Africa, Asia and South America, although the Union of South Africa attended the congress in 1948 prior to the constitutive assembly in 1950.

On the final day of the assembly on 27 November 1950, the constitution of "The International Federation of War Veterans Organisations" (in French "Fédération internationale des organisations d'anciens combattants") was adopted.

The first elected executive committee members of the WVF were Mr. Albert Morel of France as president, Mr. Elliot Newcomb of the United States as secretary general, Mr. Roger Parmelan of France as treasurer general and Mr. Celebonovic of Yugoslavia, Mr. Mahmut Nedim Zapcı of Turkey, Mr. Joseph Neves of Belgium and Mr. Pietro Ricci of Italy as delegates.

The name of the federation was changed to "The World Veterans Federation" (in French "Fédération mondiale des anciens combattants") at the 2nd General Assembly, which was held in Belgrade, Yugoslavia from 27 to 30 November 1951. It was the first amendment to the WVF Constitution.

=== Founding members ===
The founding member associations were from Belgium (Democratic Union of War Veterans, Disabled and War Victims (UDCIM), France (French Union of War Veterans and War Victims Associations (UFAC), Italy (National Association of War Veterans and Repatriated Soldiers (ANCR) and National Association of War Disabled (ANMIG). Luxembourg (Luxembourg Association of Veterans of World War II and of the United Nations Forces (AACL), Netherlands (Netherlands Association of Military War Victims (BNMO), Turkey (Turkish Association of War Disabled, Widows and Orphans), United States (American Veterans Committee (AVC), American Veterans of World War II (AMVETS), Blinded Veterans Association (BVA) and Disabled American Veterans (DAV) and Yugoslavia (Federation of Veterans Associations of the People’s Liberation War of Yugoslavia (SUBNOR).

=== Changes in the WVF ===
There have been considerable changes in the WVF in the last 70 years. Its membership has grown from just a few associations from 8 countries to more than 170 associations from 121 countries. Its membership, which was confined to Europe and the United States in the early days, now covers all the continents of the world including a growing number of associations from developing countries.

The composition and the character of the WVF member associations have also changed. They are no longer confined to organisations made up of veterans and victims of the two world wars. Instead, the WVF membership is now made up of a mixture of various organisations representing veterans, ex-servicemen, victims of war, resistance fighters, former prisoners of war, former peace keepers and former peace builders whose individual interests, needs and priorities differ quite considerably from one another.

== Organisation ==
=== Organisation and management ===
The WVF consists of the following permanent elements: a general assembly, an executive board, regional standing committees, a standing committee on women and a financial committee. It is managed by its executive board composed of the president, the deputy president, 6 vice presidents, the secretary general and the treasurer general. The headquarters of the WVF is in Paris, France.

=== Regional standing committees ===
The WVF has five regional standing committees:

- Standing Committee on African Affairs (SCAA)
- Standing Committee for Asia and the Pacific (SCAP)
- Standing Committee on European Affairs (SCEA)
- Standing Committee for Americas (SCA)
- Standing Committee for Middle East (SCME)

The regional standing committees are composed of representatives from member organizations in the relevant geographical region. Each regional standing committee elects a chairperson from among its membership who is appointed ex officio vice president of the WVF.

=== Standing Committee on Women (SCOW) ===
The Standing Committee on Women is composed of designated representatives for women's affairs from WVF member organizations and the chairpersons of the Working Groups on Women established within each of the Regional Standing Committees. The Committee elects a Chairperson from among its membership who is appointed ex officio Vice President of the WVF.

== Members ==
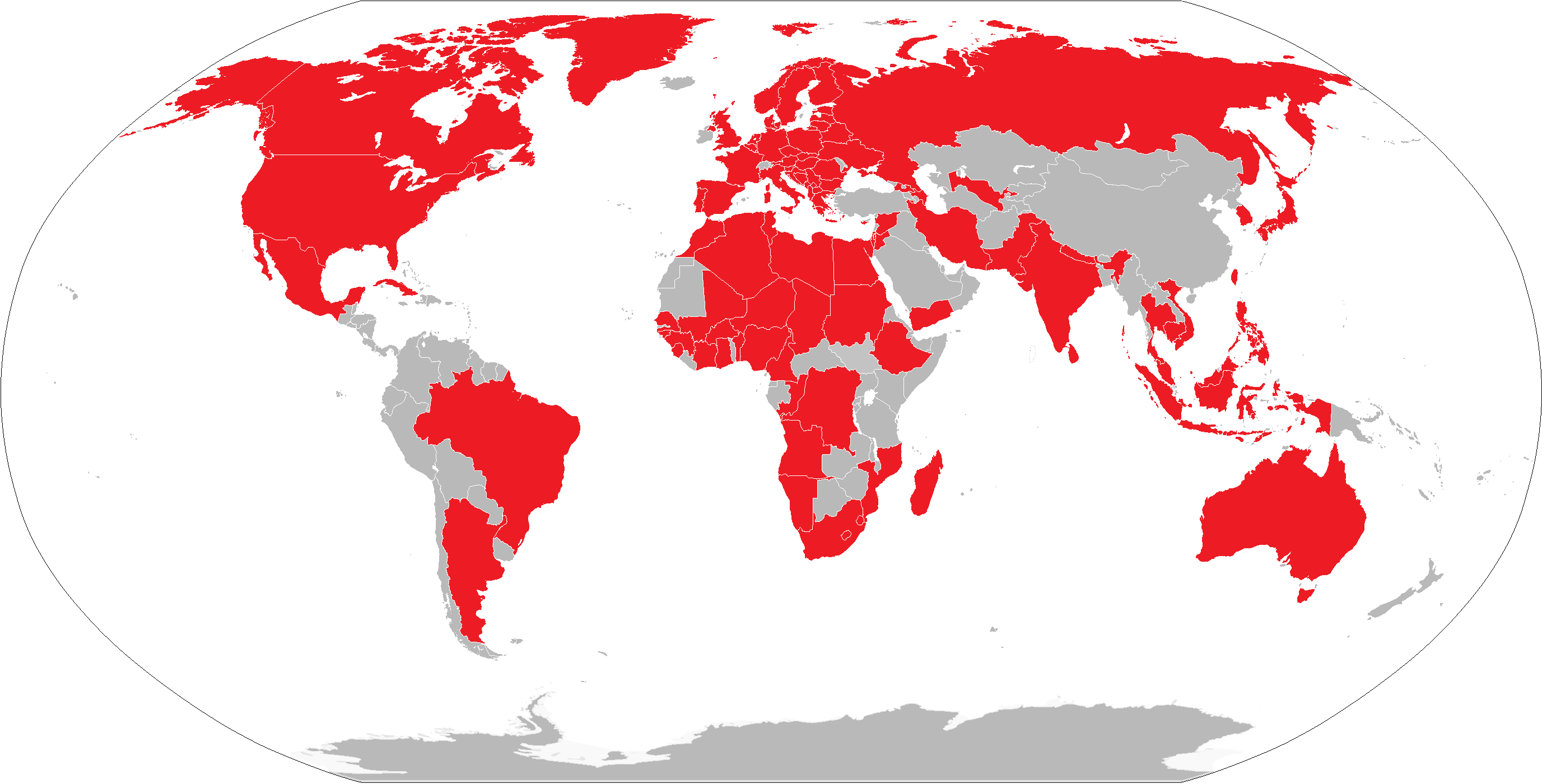
Red areas have at least one member of the World Veterans Association.

As of 2006, the following organizations were members of the WVF.

=== Africa ===
- Algerian National Organisation of Moujahidines
- War Veterans Association of the People's Republic of Angola
- Association of War Disabled Ex-Servicemen of Angola
- National Union of War Veterans, Holders of the War Veterans' Certificate and Victims of War of Benin
- War Veterans, Ex-Servicemen, Widows and Orphans Association (Burkina Faso)
- Fraternal Association of Solidarity and Economic Mutual Aid of Veterans and War Victims in Cameroon
- National Office for War Veterans, Ex-Servicemen and Victims of War of Cameroon
- Fraternal Union of War Veterans of the French Armies of Chad
- National Veterans Union (Republic of the Congo)
- National Federation of Associations of Overseas Veterans and Servicemen (Republic of the Congo)
- National Office of War Veterans and War Victims of the Republic of Congo
- National Union of Congolese War Veterans (Democratic Republic of the Congo)
- Association of War Veterans of Cote d'Ivoire
- Egyptian Veterans and War Victims Association
- Ancient Ethiopian Patriots Association
- Veterans Administration, Ghana
- Association of Fighters for the Freedom of the Homeland (Guinea-Bissau)
- National Union of War Veterans and War Victims of the Republic of Guinea
- Lesotho Retired Military Officers Club
- Libyan League for Families of Martyrs, Prisoners of War and War Wounded
- Association of War Veterans and War Victims of Madagascar
- National Association of War Veterans and War Victims of the Republic of Mali
- National Association of War Veterans (Morocco)
- National Council for Former Resistants and Former Members of the Liberation Army (Morocco)
- Office of the High Commissioner for Former Resistants and Members of the Liberation Army (Morocco)
- Association of Military and Paramilitary Disabled Servicemen of Mozambique
- Combatant's Association of National Liberation Struggle of Mozambique
- Namibia War Veterans Trust
- National Association of War Veterans and War Victims of Niger
- Nigerian Legion
- National Federation of War Veterans and War Victims of Senegal
- Sierra Leone Ex-Servicemen's Association
- Council of Military Veterans' Organisations of the Republic of South Africa
- South African National Military Veterans Association
- Sudanese Veterans Association
- Umbutfo Swaziland Defence Force Ex-Servicemen's Association
- Tunisian Association of War Veterans and Victims of War
- National Association "Fidelity for the Rights of Families of Veterans who Fought with France"
- Zimbabwe National Liberation War Veterans Association

=== Asia ===
- Cambodia Veterans Association
- Indian Ex-Services League
- Veterans Legion of the Republic of Indonesia
- Veterans and War Victims Foundation of Iran
- Association of Disabled Veterans of the Fight against Nazism (Israel)
- Association of Disabled Veterans of World War II (Israel)
- Israel Defense Forces Veterans of War Association
- Organization of Partisans, Underground & Ghetto Fighters in Israel
- Zahal Disabled Veterans Organization (Israel)
- Japan Disabled Veterans Association
- Jordanian Economic & Social Ass. For Retired Servicemen & Veterans
- Korea Disabled Veterans Organization
- Korean Veterans Association
- Retirees Service Administration (Kuwait)
- Kuwaiti Kinsfolk Association of Martyrs, Captives and Missing
- Ex-Services Association of Malaysia
- Malaysian Armed Forces Veterans Council
- Royal Malay Regiment Officers' Club
- Nepal National Ex-Servicemen's Association
- Association of Palestinian Revolution Ex-Warriors
- Pakistan Armed Services Board
- Confederation of Filipino Veterans
- Philippines Veterans Legion
- Veterans Federation of the Philippines
- Singapore Armed Forces Veterans' League
- Sri Lanka Ex-Services Association
- Association of Veterans and Victims of War (Syria)
- Veterans Affairs Council (R.O.C on Taiwan)
- Veterans Association of Republic of China（VAROC） （R.O.C on Taiwan）
- Association of Veterans of the National Liberation War of Timor Leste
- War Veterans Organization of Thailand
- Veterans Association of Vietnam
- Organization of Veterans of the Yemen Revolution and the Defense of Unification
- The Veterans Legion of the Republic of Indonesia (LVRI)

=== Europe ===
- National Organisation of Veterans of the Anti-Fascist National Liberation Struggle of the People of Albania
- Unified Organisation of Veterans of the Anti-fascist Struggle of Liberation of the Albanian People
- Austrian Association of Victims of War and of Disabled
- Association of the Volunteers and Veterans of the Homeland War HVO H-B
- Association of veterans of the People's Liberation & Antifascist War of Bosnia & Herzegovina (1941-1945)
- Bosnia & Herzegovina Association of War Disabled Veterans
- Union of Association of Veterans of People's Liberation War (1941-1945) SUBNOR in the Rep. Srpska
- United Veterans Organization – Veterans Union of Bosnia & Herzegovina
- Veterans Organization of the Srpska Republic
- War Veterans Union (Bulgaria)
- Antifascist Combatants' Association of the Rep. of Croatia
- Association of Croatian Patriotic War Veterans
- Croatian Association of Prisoners in Serbian Concentration Camps
- Croatian Homeland Volunteer War Volunteer Veterans Association
- Croatian War Veterans Association
- Union of Associations of Croatian Defence Force Veterans
- Union of Associations of Croatian Defenders Treated for PTSD
- Union of Croatian Homeland War Volunteers Associations
- Veterans Motorcycle Club - Croatia
- Cyprus Veterans Association World War II
- Association of Czech Legionaries
- Czech Veteran's Association
- Blue Berets Denmark
- Disabled War Veterans Association of Finland
- Federation of Women Veterans in Finland
- Finnish War Veterans Federation
- Union of Front Veterans Soldiers
- Peacekeepers Association Finland
- Union Française des Associations de Combattants (France)
- Union nationale des combattants (France)
- German Federal Armed Forces Association
- Advisory Council on Voluntary Reservist Activities to the German Armed Forces Reservist's Association
- National General Confederation of Greek War Disabled and Victims
- Union Panhellenique des Anciens Combattants de la Résistance Nationale (Greece)
- Panhellenic Union of Veterans from the National Resistance
- Hungarian Federation of Resistance Fighters and Antifascists
- Hungarian Alliance of Military Fellowship
- National Association of War Veterans and Repatriated Soldiers (Italy)
- National Association of Families of the War Dead and Missing (Italy)
- National Association of War Disabled
- National Association of Italian Partisans
- Italian Federation of Volunteers for Freedom
- Institute of the Blue Ribbon
- Luxemburg Association of Veterans of World War II, of the United Nations Forces and of Luxemburg Peace Soldiers
- Kosovo Liberation Army War Veterans Organization
- Union of Veterans from the National Liberation and Antifascist War of Macedonia 1941-1945
- Union of Associations of Antifascists of Montenegro
- National Council of the Former Dutch Resistance Movement
- Netherlands Association of Military War Victims
- Norwegian Veterans Association for International Operations (withdrew its membership in October 2022)
- War Veterans Council of Norway
- Association of Combatants of the Polish Republic and Former Political Prisoners
- Association of War Disabled Persons of the Polish Republic
- World Association of Home Army Soldiers (Poland)
- UN Peacekeeping Missions Veterans Association (Poland)
- Association of Armed Forces Handicapped (Portugal)
- Veterans League (Portugal)
- National Association of War Veterans (Romania)
- Alliance of the Associations of the former fighters of the People's Liberation War in Serbia
- Association of Disabled War Veterans and Peacetime Military Invalids of Serbia
- Slovak Antifascist Fighters Association
- Association of Veterans of the War for Slovenia
- Federation of Disabled War Veterans Associations of Slovenia
- Union of the Associations of the War Veterans and Participants of the National Liberation Struggle of Slovenia
- Sever Association of Police Veterans Societies (Slovenia)
- Federation of Associations and Clubs MORiS (Slovenia)
- Association of Invalid Militaries and Civil Guards of Spain
- Association of Swedish Field Hospital for Korea
- Swedish Veterans Federation
- British Members' Council
- British Limbless Ex-Service Men's Association
- Ex-Services Mental Welfare Society (Combat Stress)
- Blind Veterans UK
- Royal British Legion
- War Widows Association of Great Britain

=== Former Soviet Union ===
- Council of Veterans of War, Labour & Armed Forces of the Azerbaijan Republic
- Association of War Veterans from the Afghanistan War (Belarus)
- Veterans Organisation of the Republic of Belarus
- Union of Veterans Organisations of the Estonian Republic
- Union of War and Military Veterans of Georgia
- Veterans Defense Fund of Georgia
- Veterans and Soldiers Union of War and Military Forces of Georgia: Vaziani Union
- Caucasus Veterans Centre (Georgia)
- Georgian War, Armed Forces and Conflict Veterans' Union "Veterans for Peace"
- Latvian Association of Fighters of Anti-Hitler Coalition
- Lithuanian Committee of the World War II Antihitlerite Coalition Veterans Org.
- All Russia Non-Governmental Organization "Russian Union of Afghanistan Veterans"
- All Russia Public Organization of Veterans Battle Brotherhood
- National Russian Public Organization of War and Military Service Veterans
- All-Ukrainian Union of War Veterans
- Ukrainian Union of War Veterans of Afghanistan
- Association of International Veteran Soldiers of Uzbekistan

=== Latin America ===
- Veterans Centre of Lujan - Buenos Aires (Argentina)
- Brazilian War Veterans Association
- Association of Combatants of the Cuban Revolution
- Mexican Association of WWII Veterans

=== Oceania ===
- Netherlands Ex-Servicemen and Women's Association in Australia
- Royal Australian Air Force Association
- Royal Australian Army Nursing Corps Association

=== United States ===
- American Veterans Committee
- American Veterans Committee (1943-2008)
- American Veterans of World War II-Korea-Vietnam-AMVETS
- Disabled American Veterans
- Past National Commanders Organization
- Veterans For Peace
- Vietnam Assistance for the Handicapped
- Paralyzed Veterans of America

== Activities ==
=== Advocacy and humanitarian activities ===
The most important function of the WVF is to promote and protect the well-being of veterans and victims of war worldwide. Most of the issues it deals with are essentially social or humanitarian in nature. It is very much involved in the promotion of social justice, the enhancement of the quality of life and the development of the full potential of each individual within the veteran and the victims of war community. Most of these activities are carried out in the form of advocacy through the United Nations, governments, veteran organisations and the general public. At the same time, the WVF functions as a charity by providing direct and indirect aid and assistance to its members and non-members.

=== Global peace movement ===
As a responsible member of the international community, the WVF supports and assists the United Nations in their effort to promote international peace and security. One of the ways it does this is by organising an annual global "Veterans Walk for Peace" event on 21 September, the International Day of Peace. On this day the veteran community worldwide leads all the peace-loving people of the world and their governments to observe the International Day of Peace – the day of global ceasefire and non-violence.

== WVF Credo ==
"None can speak more eloquently for peace than those
who have fought in war.
The voices of war veterans are a reflection of the longing for peace
of people the world over, who within a generation have twice
suffered the unspeakable catastrophe of world war.
Humanity has earned the right to peace.
Without it, there can be no hope for the future.
And without hope, man is lost.
The voice of the people must be heeded.
They aspire to a richer life in freedom, equality and dignity,
as in things material; they pray for peace.
Their will for peace and a better life can be, must be, crystallized
into an irresistible force against war, aggression and degradation.
The people have had to work and sacrifice for wars.
They will work more willingly for peace.
Let there be a dedicated effort, a greater crusade
than history has ever known, for a world of
peace, freedom and equality."

Ralph Bunche
Nobel Peace Prize, 1950
