= Kelechi Onuzuruike =

Nigerian politician (born 1976)

The Right Honorable Kelechi Onuzuruike (KSC)

Member of the Abia State House of Assembly for Umuahia North constituency
- In office 2015–2023
- Preceded by: Emeka Ejiogu

Personal details
- Born: Kelechi Chiadikobi Onuzuruike; February 19, 1976 (age 50) Abia State
- Citizenship: Nigerian
- Party: People's Democratic Party (PDP) (2017 - Date)
- Other political affiliations: All Progressives Grand Alliance (APGA) (2015 - 2017)
- Education: Bachelor of Laws; PgD of Business Management; Master of Business Administration
- Alma mater: Abia State University; London School of Business and Finance; University of Chichester
- Occupation: Politician
- Committees: Committee on Environment (chairperson); Committee on Appropriation; Committee on Finance; Committee on Agriculture; Committee on Transport; Committee on Public Utilities and Water Resources; Committee on Health and Women Affairs; Committee on Education; Investigation Committee on the operations of Abia State University and Abia State College of Education (Technical); Investigation Committee on the Paris Club Refund; Deputy Chief Whip

Kelechi Onuzuruike (born 19 February 1976) is a Nigerian politician. He is the Former Deputy Chief Whip of the Abia State House of Assembly. He formerly represented Umuahia North state constituency in the Abia State House of Assembly.

== Background and education ==
Onuzuruike is a native of the Nkwoegwu Ohuhu clan in Umuahia North, Abia State, Nigeria. He has one elder brother, Chief Chima Onuzuruike. After completing his secondary education at Ascension Junior Seminary, he obtained a Law degree from Abia State University, and later pursued a postgraduate diploma in Business Management at the London School of Business and Management. He continued his academic journey at the University of Chichester in the United Kingdom, where he earned a Master of Business Administration (MBA).

He is one of the Knights of St Columba of the Anglican Church in Nigeria.

== Political career ==
Onuzuruike was executive assistant on special duties to the Governor of Imo State, Rochas Okorocha from 2012 to 2014. He was then elected under the All Progressives Grand Alliance (APGA) in 2015 to represent Umuahia North state constituency in the 6th Abia State House of Assembly. In 2016, a Federal High court in Umuahia nullified the election of Onuzuruike. The court declared that Sunday Ajero was the validly elected candidate of APGA for the constituency. Ajero had challenged Onuzuruike's candidacy, claiming that he emerged through a parallel primary. However Onuzurike went on to complete his term and was re-elected for a second term in 2019.

In 2017, he switched parties, leaving APGA and joining the Peoples Democratic Party (PDP). In 2019, he alongside the Umuahia North Local Government chairman raised concerns over the flooding of ravaged several houses, businesses and farmlands in the Amaogwugwu community in his constituency. He also expressed surprise over the flooding because it was not predicted by the Nigeria Hydrological Services Agency and was worried about the implications of the disaster on the health and hygiene of both the people and the affected area.

Onuzuruike suggested that governorship zoning be ditched in Abia State and suffered criticisms from several quarters for his utterances.

He was the Abia State House of Assembly Committee Chairman of Environment when he decried the poor state of sanitation in major towns in the states of Umuahia, Aba and Ohafia and summoned the Abia State Protection Agency (ASEPA) General Manager before the house. This directly led to the sacking of the environmental agency boss by the state Governor Okezie Ikpeazu for incompetence. Onuzurike has sponsored bills on establishing an environmental trust fund in Abia State and making Agricultural Science a module in secondary schools. He has also raised urgent matters, such as compelling ASEPA to fulfill its mandate of cleaning the environment. He was appointed as a member of the committee with the responsibility of scrutinizing the financial activities and utilization of both the revenue generated by Abia State College of Education (Technical) (ASCETA) and Abia State University (ABSU), as well as the monthly subventions provided by the state government. He joined the Abia State Assembly to condemn Fulani Herdsmen's killings of Ukwa citizens and Abia people. He also railed against the unacceptable state of the topography of Ohuhu (which is in his constituency) because of erosion ravaging the land. He also proposed a bill to stop the indiscriminate use and duplication of license plates meant for government officials by unauthorized persons, urging that its proliferation should be curbed, its production stopped and those already in circulation be mopped up.

He participated in the PDP primaries, where the party's flag bearer for the Ikwuano/Umuahia North/Umuahia South Federal Constituency in the House of Representatives for the 2023 general elections was to be determined. He lost to Chinedum Orji, the incumbent Speaker of the Abia House of Assembly. He was appointed as the Director of the Peoples Democratic Party (PDP) National Youth Campaign Council for Abia State, leading the PDP's youth wing in the state during the 2023 general election campaign and mobilizing young people to support the PDP's presidential candidate, Atiku Abubakar, in order to secure a victory for the party.

Kelechi Onuzuruike congratulated Governor Okezie Ikpeazu on being awarded Governor of the year for SME Development 2021 by the New Telegraph in Lagos, describing it as well-deserved.

== Philanthropy ==
In 2022, he donated the money for two years' house rent to Mr. and Mrs. Chibuzor Ikwunze who had lost their four children to food poisoning after eating some pieces of suya. In the same year, he and a few others contributed to buy the PDP governorship nomination form for Lucky Igbokwe. He joined well-to-do members of his Ohuhu clan to donate relief materials to the downtrodden in his community during the COVID-19 lockdown. The materials included foodstuffs and protective material.
