= Nkporo =

Nkporo Okwe City(Nkporo Okwe Ezeaja Iwoo Ancient Kingdom ♚)
- Town
- Nickname: Okwe City
- Location in Nigeria
- Coordinates: 5°46′0″N 7°46′0″E
- Country: Nigeria
- State: Abia State
- LGA: Ohafia
- Time zone: UTC+1 (WAT)

Nkporo (Okwe ancient kingdom) is a town in Abia State, in southeastern Nigeria, traditionally an Igbo speaking region. It is in the Ohafia Local Government Area.

== History ==
Nkporo is said to be one of the oldest communities among clans that are referred to by Anthropologists and Sociologists as the Cross River Igbos. The movement of the main body of Nkporo people and the eventual opening and settling in their present-day location took almost three hundred years. Their ancestors where the original occupants of an ancient Igbo Kingdom called Ama-mpoto which existed within the Nkanal Ikot or Okoro Nkon Ikpe zone of the present Ibibio or Efik land in present-day Akwa Ibom state.

The first settlement of the Nkporo people was called Ama Mpoto which means "mpoto square". The leader of the people was named Okwo Nkwoghoro who was popularly called "Okwe" in abbreviation. It was believed that before moving to Okpukpu-Iyi Aro, Okwo Nkwoghoro begat Iwowo also known as "Iwo" who in turn begat Aja. From Ama Mpoto, Nkporo people migrated to Okpukpu-Iyi Aro which is believed to be around the present Amuvi village in Arochukwu.

Many reasons were responsible for this movement but some of the major reasons are; as the population of the people increased, the need for a larger space that will accommodate its growing population arose, inter tribal war between the Nkporo people and Afachima Achi the then leader of the Ibibios, and as well as the issue of settling in a more fertile and fruitful land which was also paramount in the minds of the people.

Iwo was a very skilled diplomat and he enjoyed a good relationship with the Ibibio king, Afachima Achi. They both respected their friendship and enjoying peace until Iwoo died and his son Aja who was young and full of youthful exuberance succeeded his father. Being a young man, Aja was not as tolerant and wise as his late father in his dealings with the older Ibibio king and he did not hide it. Nkporo people are war-like in nature and this also did not allow the young Aja to sustain the cordial relationship that existed between them and the Ibibios in his late father's years.

The people of Nkporo always found themselves at loggerheads with the Ibibio warriors under the leadership of Afachima Achi and they strongly believe where they were was not their promise land. All these factors made it imminent for them to move from Ama Mpoto to Okpukpu Iyi Aro. They lived here for a very long time before moving to Ugwu Iyi Ekirika which is around the present Nde Okpo Ihechiowa, where it is believed that a group that still calls itself Nkporo was left behind. From there they continued to Ugwu Isiagha located between Ihechiowa and the present Nde Uduma Awoke village from were they moved out again and established a place called Udara Ebuo.

At this time the Aja who led the people out from Ama Mpoto was no longer alive but due to how famous he became as a no-nonsense war-like leader who dealt with the Ibibio people and their king, he had already earned the name "Nkporo" for his people, "Nkporo" is an Ibibio language which means "Buffalo", the Ibibios referred to king Aja (Eze-Aja) and his people as Nkporo due to how they battle and destroy their enemies without mercy.

Before his death, King Aja was very popular especially in Okpukpu-Iyi Aro when Afachima Achi sent a message to the king of Arochukwu advising him to always make sure he is at peace with king Aja whom he described as "Nkporo" ( Buffalo ) that is war-like and ever ready to fight, and that is the reason behind the cordial relationship and friendship between the people of Arochukwu and the people of Nkporo till date. In Okpukpu-Iyi Aro, Aja was being referred to as Eze-Aja while his people were being referred to as the Nkporo people, over time these names became adopted and till date anyone who ascends the throne of the Nkporo ancient kingdom is being referred to as the Eze-Aja of Nkporo.

== Geography ==
Nkporo is one of the three clans that make up the Ohafia Local Government Area of Abia state Nigeria, the other two being Abiriba clan and Ohafia clan. Nkporo is bounded on the South by Abiriba, on the west by Item on the North by Akaeze and Oso-Edda, on the East by Edda, and on the South East by Ohafia.

Nkporo is grouped into three geopolitical zones namely: Ndi Elu, Ndi Etiti and Ndi Agbo.

"Ndi Elu" is made up of two communities (Etitiama and Amurie), "Ndi Etiti" is made up of three communities (Elughu, Obofia and Ndi-Nko) while "Ndi Agbo" is made up of three communities (Agbaja, Okwoko and Ukwa).

Nkporo is made up of eight original communities or villages. Names of Nkporo communities listed in alphabetical other:

(1) Agbaja

(2) Amurie

(3) Elughu

(4) Etitiama

(5) Ndi-Nko

(6) Obofia

(7) Okwoko

(8) Ukwa

== Notable people ==
- Arua Arunsi, First speaker Abia State house of Assembly (1992 - 1993). Former member federal house of representatives, representing Arochukwu/Ohafia federal constituency.
- Obasi Igwe, Professor of Political Science and author of the notable book, Politics and Globe Dictionary. He also authored Nkporo: The History of an Igbo City-State from Antiquity to the Present (2007).
- Ude Oko Chukwu, former deputy Governor Abia State (2015 - 2023), former speaker 5th Abia state house of Assembly.
- K. O. K. Onyioha, Religious leader and founder of Godianism, (Author: African Godianism A Revolutionary Religion For Mankind Through Direct Communication With God).
- Nons Miraj, Nollywood Actress, Skit Maker/Content Creator and social media influencer.
