= Ude Oko Chukwu =

Nigerian politician (born 1962)

The Right Honourable Sir Ude Oko Chukwu

Deputy Governor of Abia State
- In office 29 May 2015 – 29 May 2023
- Governor: Okezie Ikpeazu
- Preceded by: Emeka Ananaba
- Succeeded by: Ikechukwu Emetu

Speaker of the Abia State House of Assembly
- In office 4 June 2011 – 29 May 2015
- Succeeded by: Martins Azubuike

Member of the Abia State House of Assembly
- In office 2 June 2003 – 29 May 2015
- Preceded by: Hon.Dr Tony Okoro Kalu
- Succeeded by: Egwuronu Obasi
- Constituency: Ohafia North

Personal details
- Born: Ude Oko Chukwu; 1 January 1962 (age 64) Nkporo, Eastern Region (now in Abia State), Nigeria
- Party: Peoples Democratic Party
- Spouse: Nnenna Vivien Oko Chukwu
- Education: University of Lagos
- Occupation: Politician; accountant

Ude Oko Chukwu (born 1 January 1962) is a Nigerian accountant and politician who served as the deputy governor of Abia State from 2015 to 2023. He previously served as the speaker of the Abia State House of Assembly from 2011 to 2015 and as member of the Abia State House of Assembly from 2003 to 2015.

== Early life and education ==
Ude was born on 1 January 1962 into a Catholic family in Etitiama Nkporo, a town in the Ohafia local government area of Abia State. He completed his basic education at Etitiama Primary School, Nkporo and his secondary education at Nkporo Comprehensive Secondary School, Nkporo in 1970 and 1982 respectively.

== Career ==
=== Accounting ===
Ude served as an accountant for SMACS Computers and General Manager, CONTECH Ventures Ltd. between 1988 and 1996 before he went on to establish Chukwu Ude Oko Chukwu and Co. (Chartered Accountants) in 2001. He is a fellow of the Institute of Chartered Accountants of Nigeria (FCA).

=== Politics ===
He became politically active in 2001 and in 2003 won a seat in the Abia State House of Assembly, representing Ohafia North Constituency. He was also elected Speaker of the 5th Abia State House of Assembly in 2011, a position he held until he was elected deputy governor in 2015.
