= Emeka Obioma =

Nigerian politician

Hon. Emeka Obioma

Chief Whip
- Incumbent
- Assumed office 29 May 2023
- Constituency: Umuahia South State Constituency

Personal details
- Born: 7th December
- Party: Labour Party(LP)
- Education: Abia State University

Emeka Obioma is a Nigerian politician. He currently serves as the Chief Whip of the Abia State House of Assembly representing Umuahia South State Constituency. He was elected into office on 29 May 2023.

Emeka Obioma is a member of Labour Party.

== Early life and education ==
Emeka Obioma (born 7 December) is a Nigerian politician currently serving as the Chief Whip of the Abia State House of Assembly. He represents the Umuahia South State Constituency as a member of the Labour Party (LP). Obioma is an alumnus of Abia State University.

== Political career ==
Obioma began his legislative career when he won the seat for Umuahia South in the 2023 Abia State House of Assembly elections. Upon his inauguration on 29 May 2023, he was appointed Chief Whip playing a central role in maintaining party discipline and coordinating legislative business within As Chief Whip.

In March 2024 Obioma sponsored a bill aimed at establishing nursing education facilities, which was referred to the House Committee on Health.

Obioma stated that

"Our elders are the bedrock of our society; they have contributed immensely to the growth of our communities, and it is time we recognize and protect their rights,"

— National SUNRISE, I will champion a Bill for Rights of Elders; Abia Assembly Chief Whip, Emeka Obioma declares
