= Okoro Uchenna Kalu =

Nigerian politician and journalist

Okoro Uchenna Kalu is a Nigerian politician, journalist and former banker. Kalu has served as the member of Abia State House of Assembly since 2023. Kalu is the majority leader of the assembly.

== Background and early life ==
Kalu is from Atan Abam in Arochukwu Local Government Area, Abia State, Nigeria.

== Career ==
Uchenna is a banker and journalist who worked as a correspondent at The Whistler newspaper in Rivers State, Nigeria.

Since 2023, Kalu has served as a lawmaker at the Abia State House of Assembly. He currently serves as the majority leader of the assembly.
