= Chima Nwafor =

Nigerian politician (1948–2006)

Deputy Governor of Abia State
- In office March 2003 – March 2006
- Governor: Orji Uzor Kalu
- Preceded by: Enyinnaya Abaribe
- Succeeded by: Eric Acho Nwakanma
- In office January 1992 – November 1993
- Governor: Ogbonnaya Onu

Personal details
- Born: Clement Chima Nwafor; 10 June 1948 Umuojima, Osisioma Ngwa, Southern Region, British Nigeria (now in Abia State, Nigeria)
- Died: 21 March 2006 (aged 57)
- Party: National Republican Convention (1991–1993); Peoples Democratic Party (1998–2006)
- Children: Enyinnaya Nwafor
- Occupation: Politician; surgeon

Clement Chima Nwafor (10 June 1948 – 21 March 2006) was a Nigerian surgeon and politician who served twice as the deputy governor of Abia State from 1992 to 1993 and from 2003 until his death in 2006.
