= Emeka Ananaba =

Nigerian politician and military officer (born 1945)

Chief Emeka Ananaba

Deputy Governor of Abia State
- In office 29 May 2011 – 29 May 2015
- Governor: Theodore Orji
- Preceded by: Eric Acho Nwakanma
- Succeeded by: Ude Oko Chukwu

Personal details
- Born: 31 March 1945 (age 81) Obegu, Ugwunagbo, Southern Region, British Nigeria (now in Abia State, Nigeria)
- Party: Peoples Democratic Party
- Spouse: Nnenne Ananaba
- Education: University of Nigeria, Nsukka
- Occupation: Politician; military officer; pharmacist
- Military career
- Education: Nigeria Air Force Military Training School
- Allegiance: Nigeria (1964–1967); Biafra (1967–1970)
- Branch: Nigerian Air Force; Biafran Air Force
- Service years: 1964–1970
- Rank: Colonel
- Units: 4th Commando Brigade; Ginger Brigade
- Conflicts: Nigerian Civil War
- Other work: Pharmacist

Emeka Ananaba (born 31 March 1945) is a Nigerian retired military officer, pharmacist and politician who served as the deputy governor of Abia State from 2011 to 2015 under Governor Theodore Orji.

== Biography ==
Ananaba was born on the 31 March 1945 at Obegu, in present day Ugwunagbo in Abia State. He attended St. Peters Primary School Obegu from 1951 and 1959 before proceeding to the Kings College Lagos for his secondary education from 1959 to 1963. He joined the military in 1964 after graduating from secondary school by enrolling in the Nigeria Air Force Military Training School Kaduna. He attended the Nigeria Military Training College Kaduna from 1965 to 1966. He was commissioned as Second Lieutenant Nigeria Air Force 189 Combatant Regular Commission in July 1965. During the Nigeria Civil War, he fought on the Biafra side. He commandeered the Biafran 8th Commando Brigade and rose to the rank of Lieutenant Colonel. After the war, Ananaba left the military to study Pharmacy at the University of Nigeria, Nsukka in 1971 and graduated with a B Pharm. in 1976. In 1983, he was made a Chief and a Knight in 2001.

== Pharmaceutical career ==
Ananaba Served in the following organizations as a pharmacist

Pupil Pharmacist General Hospital, Port Harcourt, 1976–1977

Production Pharmacist, Teaching Hospital Port Harcourt, 1977

Medical Representative, E Merck Pharmaceuticals, 1978–1980

Branch Manager Pharco (Nig.) LTD., 1981

Chairman, Disciplinary Committee, Imo State Branch of Pharmacist Board, 1981–1983
