= Nnamdi Chimdi Ibekwe =

Nigerian politician

Nnamdi Chimdi Ibekwe (born 1972) is a Nigerian politician who serves as a member of the 8th Abia State House of Assembly representing Bende North State Constituency under the People's Democratic Party (PDP).

Ibekwe currently serves as the Chairman of the House Committee on Finance in the Abia State House of Assembly.
