= Obegu =

- Town
- Location of Obegu in Nigeria
- Coordinates: 4°59′4.1053″N 7°19′32.82″E
- Country: Nigeria
- State: Abia State
- Local Government Area: Ugwunagbo
- Time zone: UTC+1 (WAT)
- ZIP: 453120

Obegu is a rural autonomous community located in Ugwunagbo local government area of Abia State south-eastern Nigeria. Its postal code is 453120.

== Conflict ==
After a series of failed negotiations, Obegu would be invaded by the Royal Niger Company of Britain in 1901. This marked the start of the Anglo-Aro War (1901-1902) between the Company and Nigeria.

== Notable people ==
- Emeka Ananaba, former Deputy Governor of Abia State
- Nathan Kanu — Nigerian priest
