= Thomas Nkoro =

Nigerian politician

Thomas Nkoro is a Nigerian politician who represented Obingwa West Constituency of Abia State in the 6th Abia State House of Assembly.
