= Anthony Chinasa =

Nigerian lawmaker

Anthony Chinasa-Abiola

Personal details
- Born: Anthony Chinasa Ibeku, Abia State, Nigeria
- Party: Labour Party
- Occupation: Politician

Anthony Chinasa-Abiola is a Nigerian politician and member of the Abia State House of Assembly. He is representing the Umuahia Central State Constituency under the Labour Party (LP).

== Life ==
Anthony Chinasa was born in Ibeku, Abia State, Nigeria. Despite assumptions tied to his Yoruba-sounding alias, "Abiola," he clarified in a 2023 interview that he is of Igbo descent, with both parents hailing from Ibeku. The alias "Abiola" was adopted in solidarity with his political ally, Gbadebo Rhodes-Vivour, during the 2023 elections.

In 2023, Chinasa won the election to represent the Umuahia Central State Constituency in the Abia State House of Assembly. Running under the Labour Party, his campaign emphasised transparency, community engagement, and legislative reform.
