= Austin Okezie Meregini =

Nigerian politician

State Representative
- Constituency: Umuahia East

Personal details
- Party: Labour Party (Nigeria)
- Occupation: Politician

Austin Okezie Meregini (also known as Ugolee) is a Nigerian politician and legislator who serves as the Deputy Speaker of the Abia State House of Assembly, representing Umuahia East State Constituency. He is a member of the Labour Party.

== Political career ==
Meregini was elected to represent Umuahia East State Constituency in the Abia State House of Assembly in 2023. Following his election, he was chosen as the Deputy Speaker of the 8th Abia State House of Assembly under Speaker Emma Emeruwa's leadership.

Prior to joining the Labour Party, Meregini was a member of the All Progressives Congress (APC). He resigned from the APC in May 2022, citing concerns about internal party crisis and disagreements with the National Working Committee's handling of primary elections.

== Personal life ==
Meregini is married. His wife has been involved in some of his constituency projects and public appearances.
