= K. O. K. Onyioha =

Nigerian religious leader

- Born: Kalu Onu Kama Onyioha; Nkporo, Abia State, Nigeria

Born to Ogbuagu Onu Kama of Ukwa Ukwu village of Nkporo, Kama Onu Kama (K.O.K.) was born in July 1923. When he was in school, he was taught to sing with gusto "Rule Britannia" during Empire Day celebrations imposed on the people by the British colonial government of the time. Kept at arm's length from the colonialists, he and his compatriots got the impression from a distance that the Europeans had come to Okebulani (Africa) to share their Christian civilization with them.

This impression so dominated their mind that when, in 1943, Dr Nnamdi Azikiwe (Zik), who later became the Governor-General and Commander-in-Chief of the Federation of Nigeria, submitted a one-man memorandum to the then Secretary of State for the Colonies asking for self-government for British West African territories in 15 years' time, they thought Zik was crazy. In fact, one Reverend minister of the Anglican church in the Port Harcourt province of the former Eastern Nigeria told K.O.K. that when he read the news in the papers, he thought that Zik was being very ungrateful to the people of Britain, more so as he, Zik, was a member of the African Press delegation which at the time was touring England as the guest of the British Government.

The reverend gentleman of the Anglican mission, who himself was a black Nigerian, carried his objection to Zik's demand to the pulpit and, in a Sunday sermon, fuming and raging, asked his congregation, "Do you think that this black devil is capable of ruling himself independent of this white angel!?" He pointed to a picture hanging behind him on a wall above his pulpit, and the picture showed an angel painted white on a white charger straddling a Satan painted black that had been trampled to the ground by the white horse. "Do you think this Zik man should be taken seriously, asking for freedom for this black devil!?", the reverend shouted again. Such was the reaction of many Nigerians to the idea of freedom for the black people when Zik first raised it in 1943.

In August of the same year, Kama Onu Kama joined the army. His unit was drafted for overseas military service. For their journey, they boarded a troopship, the SS Duchess of Richmond, and for the first time in his life since he left college, he came into closer contact with the European. The troopship was split into two-one part exclusive to the white soldiers and out of bounds to African soldiers, who were going to lay their lives on the line to fight for freedom for the British. The white soldiers had the freedom of the whole ship-no part was out of bounds to them. And so for the first time in his life, he came to know what the color bar is. He was thoroughly disillusioned. The white man had proved to be a brute. It took them ten days to reach Durban, South Africa, from Lagos, Nigeria, where they dropped anchor for three weeks. One day he went out on the streets of Durban for a stroll in company of three other Nigerians. His heart rebelled to see the way his fellow Africans were forced to live like sub-humans in Durban. He saw Africans, in place of horses, dragging the rickshaw, trotting, as a white man sat in snugly.

While in Durban, he read in a South African newspaper that a magistrate had disposed of 250 cases involving black South Africans in one day! Obviously, in the magistrate's court, there was no justice for the black man. The black skin made one guilty in any case in the South Africa he knew in 1943. He went to a pub in Durban with two other friends for some cold drinks to quench their thirst, and they were refused service. As they were about to leave Durban, General Smuts' white South African soldiers boarded their ship on the same voyage to North Africa to reinforce Middle East forces. The color bar already on the ship was reinforced. They drew a real hard line of demarcation between the whites and the blacks. So much was it that one evening a South African white soldier gave Kama Onu Kama a push on the grounds that he had passed the line of demarcation into the white section, which was supposed to be out of bounds to the blacks, as he was on his way to the "blacks only" bathroom.

Kama Onu Kama retaliated with a real hard uppercut to the man's jaw. Nigerian soldiers rose like one man in rage. They drew their rifles and were poised for real bloodshed in defense of the dignity of their race. But for the tactful intervention of a Scottish colonel in charge of the Nigerian troops, there would have been a real flow of blood between the whites and the blacks on the high seas. The colonel promptly warned the white soldiers that anyone who showed any provoking sign of color bar on board the troopship would be court-marshaled.

Treason and Mutiny

In Suez, Egypt, Kama Onu Kama was charged by a British medical officer with administering a dangerous drug and being absent from duty. In the army, he was assigned to the medical corps. Before Colonel Sampson, during a preliminary investigation prior to being taken before a court-martial, Kama Onu Kama won his case against the medical officer because, in his racial bitterness and anxiety to get the noose around Kama Onu Kama's neck, his charges contradicted one another and canceled themselves. The argument against his charges was simple: Kama Onu Kama must be on duty to administer the dangerous drug which the captain alleged killed a soldier, or Kama Onu Kama was absent from duty and therefore administered no drug and killed nobody.

After this experience in Suez, Kama Onu Kama was transferred to a unit in the Kassasin desert. Embittered more than he was, he organized the Nigerian soldiers into a body known as the Nigerian Legion. They had only one aim in their constitution: to fight for Nigeria's freedom on demobilization from the army. He got the Legion registered with the National Council of Nigerian Citizens, a political organization at the forefront of the agitation for independence from the British colonialists, in 1944. During the June strike of Nigerian workers in 1945 and the banning of a political and popular newspaper, the West African Pilot, by the then British Governor in Nigeria, Sir Arthur Richards, the Nigerian Legion in Egypt organized a mutiny of black African soldiers in the Middle East in sympathy for both the workers and Nnamdi Azikiwe, whose press was banned. At once, the military authorities grabbed Kama Onu Kama, charged him with treason, participating in politics while in the army, and spreading mutinous and subversive propaganda. A Major D.T. Nicklin was an army intelligence officer who had the assignment to investigate the case, build up evidence against Kama Onu Kama, and prime him for court-martial. When the investigation reached Nigeria, the then Governor of Nigeria, Sir Author Richard, made a statement, which caused the army to drop the case against him. Thus, miraculously, he was saved from facing a firing squad. Thereafter, the British, who believed that he was dangerous and ideologically contagious, no longer would post him to any unit among Nigerian soldiers. He was isolated in the heart of the Kassasin desert for one and a half years until repatriated home in June 1946.

Nationalism

On demobilization, Dr Nnamdi Azikiwe took him in as a staff member of the West African Pilot, and his career as a journalist began. The press gave Kama Onu Kama the columns to vent his anger on British rule and the freedom to organize anti-British groups. He became the secretary of every youth organization that was against British rule in Nigeria. He became the first Secretary General of the Nigerian Legion, 1945; Secretary General of the Zikist movement and of the protest committee of Nigerian Youths, 1947; Field Secretary of the Nigerian National Federation of Labor, 1949; First Assistant Federal Secretary of the NCNC responsible for organization throughout Nigeria, 1950. He carried the fight into the religious front and became the Lagos District Superintendent of the National Church of Nigeria in 1950. For inspiration, he began conducting research into the past of African spirituality.

Ahanyi argued that Independence for Nigeria meant that Nigeria should also emphasize the importance of building a disciplined and productive nation where spiritual independence was just as important as political emancipation. In achieving independence, the shackles of colonization were removed. However, physical Independence did not necessarily imply that mentally Nigerians were sound. The British as a colonial master were not only responsible for the physical subjugation of the country, but also promoted the mental enslavement of their colonies through an incessant educational strategy designed to strip Nigerians of any sense of cultural loyalty and communal responsibility. Nigeria's primordial educational system was replaced by the European (British) system; its spirituality was demonized, and citizens were forcibly socialized through physical and mental coercion into a system that was detrimental to their mental health. It was understood that when a people's concept of God is taken away from them, they become destitute and violent. Religion therefore serves as a method of population control. The crusade for spiritual, social, political, and economic freedom and justice for the African, both on the continent and in the diaspora, included a deprogramming strategy geared toward reclaiming Africa's history and identity necessary for the rebirth of the continent.

By virtue of his efforts, Ahanyi was appointed the Spiritual Head of the National Church of Nigeria, now known as Godian Religion of Nigeria, to carry the fight into the religious front till Nigeria and the whole of Africa have won spiritual freedom, freedom of the soul or mind, and cultural freedom, in which indeed lies the true freedom of a nation or race.

Until his death in San Pedro, California, on July 29, 2003, he became Ahanyi, the Supreme Spiritual Teacher of Chiism (Godianism), and Eze Ewelu Ochie II (King) of Ukwa Ukwu, Nkporo, leading the crusade for the spiritual and cultural emancipation of the entire world. Therein lay the true freedom of humanity.

In the course of his numerous tours on a civilizing mission around the world, he delivered several sermons at the United Nations General Assembly conferences in New York, U.S.A.; was invited to address several United Nations Special Sessions on World Disarmament and delivered numerous lectures on tours of major African American and international universities all over the world. He lived for as long as Olisa Nwe Amara ordained.
