= Lewis Obianyi =

Nigerian politician

Lewis Chinaemerem Obianyi is a Nigerian politician. He currently represent the Ukwa-East State Constituency in the Abia State House of Assembly.
