= Emma Emeruwa =

Nigerian politician

Emmanuel Ihuoma Emeruwa

Speaker of the Abia State House of Assembly
- Incumbent
- Assumed office 14 June 2023
- Preceded by: Chinedum Enyinnaya Orji
- Constituency: Aba South

Personal details
- Born: October 19, 1966 (age 59) Nnentu Village, Aba South, Abia State, Nigeria
- Party: Labour Party
- Occupation: Politician

Emeruwa Emmanuel is a Nigerian politician currently serving as the speaker of the Abia State House of Assembly. He is elected from Aba South state constituency.

== Early life and education ==
Emeruwa was born on 19 October 1966 in Nnentu Village, Aba South, Abia State, Nigeria. He studied English and Literary Studies at the University of Cross River State, now the University of Uyo, from 1987 to 1991. He later studied real estate and obtained certification from the Georgia Board of Real Estate in the United States.

== Political career ==
Emeruwa was elected to represent Aba South State Constituency in the Abia State House of Assembly in the 2023 Abia State House of Assembly election on the platform of the Labour Party (LP).

Following the inauguration of the 8th Abia State House of Assembly in June 2023, Emeruwa was elected Speaker of the Assembly.

As Speaker, he has presided over legislative activities of the Assembly, including the consideration of bills, oversight functions and debates on issues affecting Abia State.

Before returning to the state legislature, Emeruwa served as Chairman of Aba South Local Government Area from 2016 to 2018. He had also contested for the state House of Assembly in 2007 and was declared elected by an election petition tribunal in 2008.
