= Chris Akomas =

Nigerian politician (born 1960)

Deputy Governor of Abia State
- In office 29 May 2007 – 30 July 2010
- Governor: Theodore Orji
- Preceded by: Acho Nwakanma
- Succeeded by: Acho Nwakanma

Personal details
- Born: 23 September 1960 (age 65)
- Party: All Progressives Congress
- Other political affiliations: Progressive Peoples Alliance
- Occupation: Politician

Chris Akomas (born 23 September 1960) is a Nigerian politician who served as the deputy governor of Abia State from 2007 until his resignation and subsequent impeachment in 2010.
