= Ikechukwu Emetu =

Nigerian politician and engineer (born 1984)

His Excellency Ikechukwu Emetu

Deputy Governor of Abia State
- Incumbent
- Assumed office 29 May 2023
- Governor: Alex Otti
- Preceded by: Ude Oko Chukwu

Personal details
- Born: Ikechukwu Lekwachi Emetu; 9 April 1984 (age 42) Ohafia, Imo State (now in Abia State), Nigeria
- Party: Labour Party
- Spouse: Adaeze Chidera Emetu
- Education: Federal University of Technology Owerri
- Occupation: Politician; engineer

Ikechukwu Lekwachi Emetu (born 9 April 1984) is a Nigerian engineer and politician who has served as Deputy Governor of Abia State since 2023.

== Early life and education ==
Emetu was born in Ohafia, Abia State, Nigeria. He attended primary and secondary school in Lagos before studying at the Federal University of Technology Owerri, where he earned a degree in engineering.

== Career ==
He is a petrochemical engineer. According to a statement by Governor Alex Otti released by the News Agency of Nigeria, Emetu was selected as the party's running mate ahead of the 2023 Abia State gubernatorial election. He received his certificate of return on 29 March 2023.

=== Deputy governorship ===
Emetu assumed office as Deputy governor of Abia State on 29 May 2023 following the inauguration of the state executive.

=== Public statements ===
In December 2024, Emetu stated that the Abia State government was committed to fostering a business-friendly environment aimed at attracting investment and supporting entrepreneurship across the state.
