= Iheanacho Nwogu =

Nigerian politician

Member, Abia State House of Assembly
- Incumbent
- Assumed office 2023
- Constituency: Osisioma North State Constituency

Personal details
- Party: Labour Party (2024–present); Young Progressives Party (2023–2024)

Iheanacho Nwogu is a Nigerian politician who serves as a member of the Abia State House of Assembly representing Osisioma North State Constituency.

He was elected to the 8th Abia State House of Assembly in 2023 under the Young Progressives Party (YPP) before later defecting to the Labour Party (LP).
