= Japanese ship Ume =

Several ships have been named Ume (梅 / うめ, "Japanese apricot") :

- Japanese destroyer Ume (1915), a Kaba-class destroyer of the Imperial Japanese Navy during World War I
- Japanese destroyer Ume (1944), a Matsu-class destroyer of the Imperial Japanese Navy during World War II
- JDS Ume (PF-289), a Kusu-class patrol frigate of the Japan Maritime Self-Defense Force, formerly USS Allentown (PF-52)

== See also ==
- Ume (disambiguation)
