= Erondu Uchenna Erondu =

Nigerian politician

Erondu Uchenna Erondu is a Nigerian politician and lawmaker. He currently serves as the State Representatives representing Obingwa West constituency of Abia State in the State Legislature.

== Career ==
In 2023, Erondu was elected into the Abia State House of assembly under the platform of Peoples Democratic Party (PDP) to represent Obingwa West Constituency.
