= Acho Nwakanma =

Nigerian politician (born 1958)

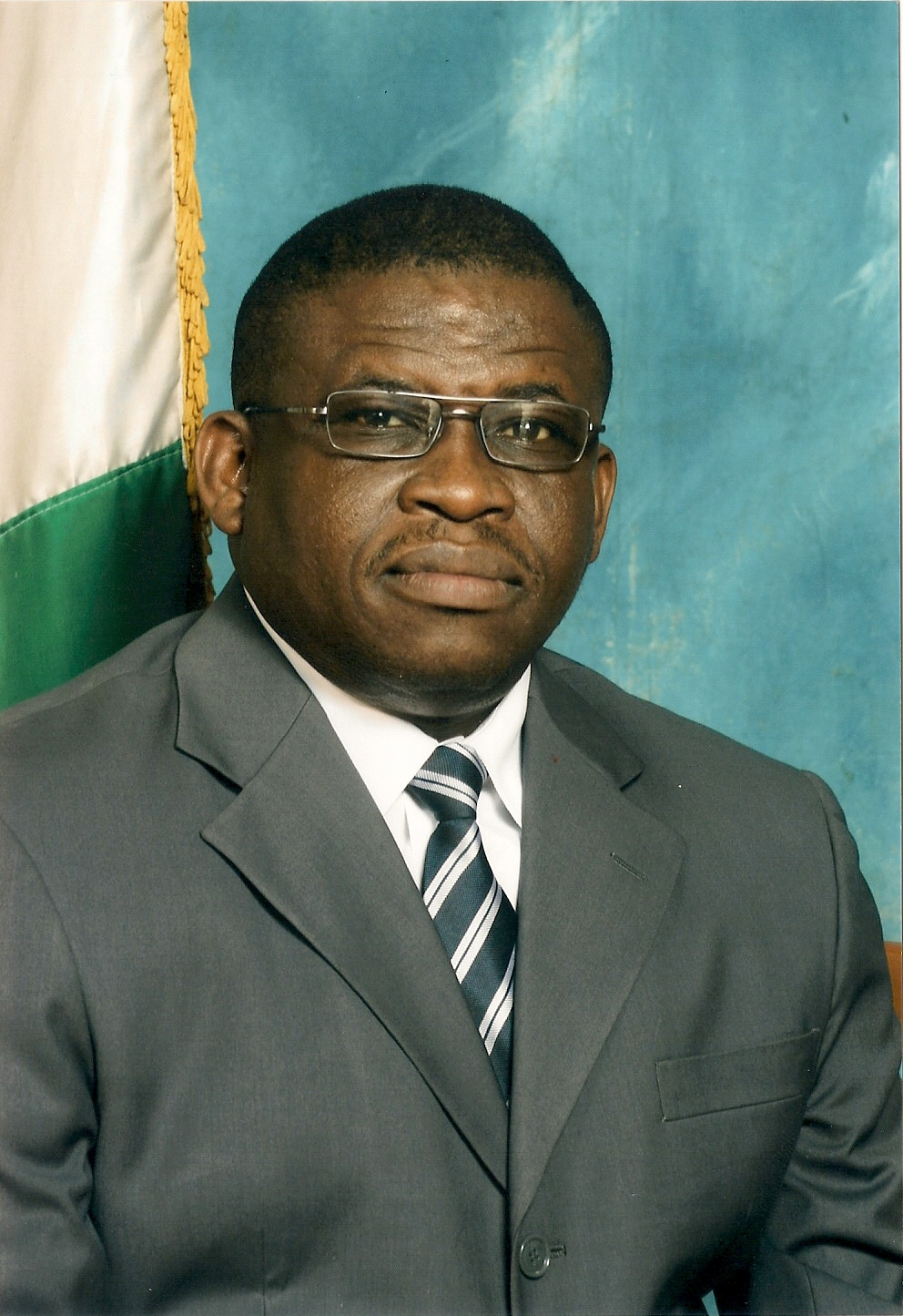

Deputy Governor of Abia State
- In office 18 August 2010 – 29 May 2011
- Governor: Theodore Orji
- Preceded by: Chris Akomas
- Succeeded by: Emeka Ananaba
- In office March 2006 – 29 May 2007
- Governor: Orji Uzor Kalu
- Preceded by: Chima Nwafor
- Succeeded by: Chris Akomas

Deputy Speaker of the Abia State House of Assembly
- In office June 2003 – March 2006
- Speaker: Stanley Ugochukwu Ohajuruka
- Preceded by: Emeka Stanley
- Succeeded by: Uzor Azubuike

Member of the Abia State House of Assembly
- In office June 1999 – March 2006
- Preceded by: Office created
- Succeeded by: Solomon Akpulonu
- Constituency: Obingwa East

Personal details
- Born: Eric Iheanocho Nwakanma; 26 April 1958 (age 68)
- Party: Peoples Democratic Party (1998–2006, 2010–present)
- Other political affiliations: Progressive Peoples Alliance (2006–2010)
- Spouse: Joy Ezinwanyi Nwakanma (m. 1987)
- Children: 4
- Occupation: Politician; businessman
- Website: www.achonwakanma2015.com

Eric Iheanacho "Acho" Nwakanma is a Nigerian politician, businessman and philanthropist who served twice as the deputy governor of Abia State from 2006 to 2007 and from 2010 to 2011.

His political career began in 1999 when he was elected into the Abia State House of Assembly to represent Obingwa East State Constituency. In 2003 he was re-elected and subsequently named deputy speaker of the House of Assembly until Kalu nominated him as deputy governor in 2006. He contested the 2007 Senatorial elections for Abia South Senatorial District on the platform of the Progressive Peoples Alliance but lost to Senator Enyinnaya Abaribe in a post election legal battle. On 18 August 2010, Orji again named him as deputy governor to succeed Chris Akomas.

Nwakanma nursed the ambition of becoming the governor of Abia State at the end of Orji's tenure in 2015. He lost the bid to his brother-in-law Okezie Ikpeazu. In April 2013, President Goodluck Jonathan appointed him as Chairman of the Board of National Neuro Psychiatry Hospital, Enugu.

== Early life and business ==
Eric Acho Nwakanma was born on 26 April 1958 to the family of Sunday Nwakanma and Jemimah Nwakanma of Umorji Ohanze in Ohanze Autonomous Community of Obingwa LGA of Abia State. After his primary education at St. Michael’s Boys School Aba where he obtained his First School Leaving Certificate in 1971, he secured admission to National High School, Aba for his Secondary Education and later transferred to Community Secondary School Nbawsi where he obtained his West African School Certificate in 1976. After that, he enrolled at Government College Umuahia for his high school and finished in 1978. He proceeded to the University of Lagos where he obtained his Bachelor of Science Degree in Biochemistry in 1982.

After his National Youth Service Corps programme in Niger State, he continued his educational pursuit at the University of Lagos and obtained a Master of Science Degree in Clinical Biochemistry in 1985. Nwakanma got an appointment as a graduate assistant at the Department of Biochemistry, College of Medicine, University of Lagos from 1985 to 1986 marking the beginning of a short career in teaching. He later worked for Chemech Laboratories Nigeria Limited (now Chemiron International) Victoria Island, Lagos as a sales representative and later as zonal manager (East) from 1986 to 1989. His business interests span transportation, real estate, importation, and agriculture. He has a huge farm in Obingwa Local Government Area of Abia State.

Acho Nwakama is a member of the National Organizing Committee of the first Nigeria-China Trade and Investment Forum.

== Politics and charity ==
Nwakanma contested for the position of Local Government Council Chairman of Obingwa LGA Abia State in a transition that was scuttled by the military. In 1998, he became one of the founding members of the Peoples Democratic Party (PDP) and in 1999, he got elected into the Abia State House of Assembly to represent Obingwa East State Constituency. He was re-elected into the Abia State House of Assembly for a second term in 2003.

While his membership of Abia Legislative House lasted, he held various House Committee positions which included:

- Chairman Finance and Economic Planning Committee
- Chairman, Boundary and Security Committee
- Member Agric and Rural Development Committee
- Member Lands, Survey and Urban Planning Committee; and
- Member Public Accounts Committee.

He was elected the Deputy Speaker of the Abia State House of Assembly a position he held for some years before being nominated as Deputy Governor of Abia State in March 2006 by Kalu. He ran for the Abia South Senatorial District Election in 2007 but lost the election to Enyinnaya Abaribe.

Nwakanma was again nominated as Deputy Governor of Abia State in August 2010 by Orji. He served out as deputy governor for the remainder of the first term of Orji as governor, leaving office on 29 May 2011.

=== The Acho Nwakanma Foundation ===
Founded in 1991, The Acho Nwakanma (TAN) Foundation has been disbursing financial grants to indigent women to help them start businesses and be self-reliant. He has donated several motorcycles, tricycles, and vehicles to a good number of Abians. He has helped set up and resettle sixty-one NDE graduates. Through the foundation, he has built houses for some widows in various parts of the state.

He is a natural sports enthusiast and has sponsored sports events over the past decade and a half. He donated a trophy for an annual inter-community football competition in Obingwa LGA. The Acho Nwakanma Foundation has also, over the years, been a consistent driver of sports development in the state, leading to the discovery of people who now ply their trade in Spain, Israel, Ukraine, South Africa, and in professional field and track events across Nigeria. He has also been the major non-government sponsor of the Abia Comets Football Club and the club rose from beginnings as an amateur side to becoming a professional team in the Nigeria Football League. He has also sponsored the Women Public Servants Soccer Tournament in Abia State.

He has on record over thirty University scholarships which are running at all times. He has at various times donated educational materials to primary and post primary schools in Obingwa LGA and beyond. In 2012 he organized a statewide free-medical scheme.

He organized the building of the 13 kilometer Acho Nwakanma Bypass, a wide road built with stone base and nylon-tar which connects Amuzu Ohanze-Ntighauzo-Ibeme in Obingwa Local Government Area and serves as a major route for travellers between Akwa-Ibom State and Abia State.

He is currently championing better rights and living conditions for mentally ill persons through his Foundation. He seeks to push through a legislation to protect mentally ill and the destitute at the National Assembly.

== Personal life ==
He is married to Joy Ezinwanyi Nwakanma and has four children, three boys and a girl. Nwakanma is a Christian and attends Living Faith Church International aka Winners Chapel.
