= Ugochukwu Iheonunekwu =

Nigerian politician

Ugochukwu Collins Iheonunekwu is a Nigerian politician. He currently serves as the member representing Isialangwa North constituency at the Abia State House of Assembly.
