= Chukwudi Apugo =

Nigerian politician

Chukwudi Apugo is a Nigerian politician. He was a member representing Umuahia East constituency of Abia State in the Abia State House of Assembly.
