= Mandela Obasi =

Nigerian politician

Mandela Obasi is a Nigerian politician and lawmaker. He currently represent Ohafia north constituency in the Abia State House of Assembly.
