= Anderson Akaliro =

Nigerian politician

State Representative
- Constituency: Umuahia North

Personal details
- Party: All Progressives Congress (Nigeria)
- Occupation: Politician

Anderson Akaliro is a Nigerian politician and lawmaker. He represents the Umuahia North State Constituency in the Abia State House of Assembly. He is a member of the All Progressives Congress (APC) and serves as Chairman of the House of Assembly Committee on Judiciary and Public Complaints.
