= Ume-Ezeoke =

Ume-Ezeoke is a surname. Notable people with the surname include:

- Edwin Ume-Ezeoke (1935–2011), Nigerian politician
- Valerian Ume-Ezeoke (born 1993), American football player
