= Stanley Nwabuisi =

Nigerian politician

Member of Abia State House of Assembly
- In office 2019–2023
- Succeeded by: Boniface Isienyi

Personal details
- Education: Rivers State University of Science and Technology, Obafemi Awolowo University

Dickson Stanley Nwabuisi is a Nigerian politician and a lawmaker. He is a former Abia State House of Assembly member under the platform of People Democratic Party between 2019 and 2023 when he represented Ikwuano constituency. In 2023, he was defeated by Engr Boniface Isienyi.

== Education ==
Stanley attended Command day secondary school for his O'Level. He proceeded to Rivers State University of Science and Technology to obtain a degree in Medical laboratory. He earned his post-graduate degree in Management from Obafemi Awolowo University.
