= Ume Mathias =

Nigerian lawmaker

Ume Mathias is a Nigerian lawmaker who has in the Abia State House of Assembly representing Umunneochi since June 14, 2023. He is a member of the Labour Party.
