= Ucheonye Stephen Akachukwu =

Nigerian politician

Ucheonye Stephen Akachukwu is a Nigerian politician and lawmaker. He currently serves as a State Representative, representing the Aba South constituency of Abia State in the State Legislature.
