= Kalu Mba Nwoke =

Nigerian politician

Kalu Mba Nwoke is a Nigerian politician and lawmaker. He currently serves as a State Representative, representing the Ohafia South constituency of Abia State in the State Legislature.
