= Fyne Ahuama =

Nigerian politician

Fyne Ahuama Onyekachi is a Nigerian politician and lawmaker. He currently represents the Osisioma South Constituency of Abia State in the State Legislature.
