= Aaron Uzodike =

Nigerian politician

Aaron Uzodike is a Nigerian politician and lawmaker. He currently serves as a State Representative, representing the Aba North State constituency of Abia State in the State Legislature.

== Career ==
On 13 August 2023, Aaron Uzodike of the Peoples Democratic Party (PDP) was sworn in as a member of the 8th Abia State House of Assembly after the Appeal Court disqualified Labour Party candidate Destiny Nwagwu. Although the court ruled in Uzodike's favor in October 2023, his swearing-in was postponed by the Speaker, Rt. Hon. Emmanuel Emeruwa, due to an ongoing court matter.
