= Lucky Johnson =

Nigerian politician

Hon. Lucky Udoka Nweke Johnson is a Nigerian politician, philanthropist, and community leader currently serving as the Member representing Isuikwuato Constituency in the Abia State House of Assembly. He is widely recognized for his grassroots development initiatives, humanitarian outreach, and strong advocacy for industrialization and improved security in his constituency.
