= Speaker of the Abia State House of Assembly =

Political head of the Abia State Legislative

Speaker of the House of Assembly of Abia State
- Incumbent; Chinedum Enyinnaya Orji since 10 June 2019
- Style: The Honourable
- Appointer: Elected by the Abia State House of Assembly
- Deputy: Ifeanyi Uchendu

The Speaker of the Abia State House of Assembly is the political head of the Abia State legislative who serves as the presiding officer of the Abia State House of Assembly. The Speaker is elected by Members of the House with the sole responsibilities of conducting meetings of the House, appointing committees and enforcing the Rules of the House. The current speaker is Chinedum Enyinnaya Orji, a People's Democratic Party member who was sworn in on 10 June 2019, succeeding Chikwendu Kalu.

== See also ==
- Abia State House of Assembly
