= Jeremiah Ogonnaya Uzosike =

Nigerian politicians

Jeremiah Ogonnaya Uzosike popularly known as Jerry Uzosike is a Nigerian politician. He was a former member of the Abia State House of Assembly representing Umuahia South State constituency.
