= Abia State College of Education (Technical) =

State government higher education institution in Arochukwu, Abia State, Nigeria

- Type: Public
- Established: 1993
- Provost: Professor Onweh, Vincent Eze
- Location: Arochukwu, Abia State, Nigeria; 5°22′42″N 7°54′37″E
- Affiliations: Michael Okpara University of Agriculture and Abia State University
- Website: www.asceta.edu.ng

The Abia State College of Education (Technical) is a state government higher education institution located in Arochukwu, Abia State, Nigeria. It is affiliated to Michael Okpara University of Agriculture and Abia State University for its degree programmes. The current Provost is Professor Onweh, Vincent Eze.

== History ==
The Abia State College of Education (Technical) was established in 1993.

== Courses ==
The institution offers the following courses;

- Christian Religious Studies
- French
- Education and Economics
- Home Economics
- Mathematics Education
- Business Education
- Political Science Education
- Education and English
- Music
- Education and Igbo
- Chemistry Education
- Agricultural Science
- Biology Education
- Computer Education
- Early Childhood Care Education

== Affiliation ==
The institution is affiliated with the Michael Okpara University of Agriculture and Abia State University to offer programmes leading to Bachelor of Education, (B.Ed.) in;
