= 6th Abia State House of Assembly =

←	5th

Overview
- Legislative body: Abia State House of Assembly
- Jurisdiction: Abia State, Nigeria
- Term: 11 June 2015 – 11 June 2019
- Election: 11 and 25 April 2015

6th Assembly
- Members: 24
- Speaker: Chikwendu Kalu
- Deputy Speaker: Cosmos Ndukwe
- Majority Leader: Chinedum Enyinnaya Orji
- Minority Leader: Chibuzo Solomon Okogbuo
- Majority Whip: Tony Mezie Nwubani
- Minority Whip: Clinton Emmanuel Ebere

The 6th Abia State House of Assembly Ended on 6 June 2019 after the House Valedictory Session Presided over by the Former Speaker Rt. Hon Chikwendu Kalu. Formed after an election in April 2015 and inaugurated on 11 June 2015, the Representatives of the Assembly were elected from 24 constituencies with the majority being members of the People's Democratic Party. The last elected Speaker was Chikwendu Kalu representing Isiala Ngwa South Constituency.

== Leadership ==
Office	Constituency	Representative	Party
Speaker of the House	Isiala Ngwa South	Chikwendu Kalu	PDP
Deputy Speaker	Bende South	Cosmos Ndukwe	PDP
Majority Leader	Umuahia Central	Chinedum Enyinnaya Orji	PDP
Deputy Majority Leader	Obingwa East	Solomon Akpulonu	PDP
Minority Leader	Bende South	Chibuzo Solomon Okogbuo	APGA
Deputy Minority Leader	Aba South	Clinton Emmanuel Ebere	APGA
Majority Whip	Ukwa West	Tony Mezie Nwabuni	PDP
Minority Whip	Ohafia South	Ifeanyi Uchendu	APGA

== Members ==
Constituency	Name	Political party
Osisioma South	Emeka Alozie	PDP
Umuahia North	Kelechi Onuzuruike	APGA
Isiala Ngwa North	Martins Azubuike	PDP
Isuikwuato	Chukwudi Ogele	PDP
Ukwa East	Paul Taribo	PDP
Umuahia East	Chukwudi J. Apugo	PDP
Ikwuano	Theophilus O. Ugboaja	APGA
Ugwunagbo	Munachim Alozie	PDP
Obingwa West	Thomas Nkoro	PDP
Ohafia North	Egwuronu Obasi	PDP
Osisioma North	Kennedy A. Njoku	PDP
Abia Central	Abraham Oba	APGA
Aba North	Blessing Nwagba	PDP
Arochukwu	Luke Ukara Onyeani	APGA
