= Chinonso Ukah =

Nigerian actress, comedian, and influencer

- Born: Chinonso Ukah; 27 May 1994 (age 32); Nkporo, Abia State, Nigeria
- Education: Babcock University
- Occupations: Actress, comedian

Chinonso Ukah (born 27 May 1994)// is a Nigerian actress, comedian, and social media influencer. She is known by her stage name Nons Miraj or Ada Jesus.

== Personal life ==
Nons Miraj was born in Abia State, Nigeria. She had her secondary education at Command Secondary School and studied at Babcock University. She is the host of one of the biggest shows in Nigeria 'the hunt games show' which started 2023.

== Career ==
=== Movie ===
She took part in the Next Movie Star, Nigerian TV reality show and became first runner-up. Chinonso began her acting career in mid-2015, starring in the Nollywood horror film Quiet. She began full time acting in 2017, after gaining admission into the university. She has also featured in several other Nollywood movies including, Imperfect (2019).

=== Comedy ===
Nons Minaj gained prominence in the comedy industry through the posting of her viral magical-mother skits on social media.

Some of her skits have featured Nigerian celebrities including Kanayo O. Kanayo, Don Jazzy, Peruzzi, among others.

She also hosts a dating game show called The Hunt Game Show

== Selected filmography ==
- Quiet (2015)
- Baby Palaver (2018)
- Sex is Not The Answer (2018)
- Cooked-Up Love (2018) as Hilda
- Imperfect (2019) as Shirley
- Our Wife (2019)
- The Alter Date (2019)
- Time and Chance (2019)
- Her Mother's Man (2019)
- Different Strokes (2019)
- Truth or Dead (2019)
- Pandora's Box (2020)
- The Miracle Centre (2020)
- The Third Wheel (2021)
- Hustle (2021) as Regina
- Love Tangled (2021) as Bola
- Chasing Clout (2023) as Mira
