= Mike Onyekwere Ukoha =

Nigerian politician

Mike Onyekwere Ukoha is a Nigerian politician. He was a member representing Arochukwu State Constituency in the 7th Abia State House of Assembly. He was elected on the platform of APGA in the 2019.
