= Emeka Okoroafor =

Nigerian politician

State Representative
- Constituency: Isuikwuato

Personal details
- Party: All Progressives Congress (APC)
- Occupation: Politician

Emeka Okoroafor is a Nigerian politician and lawmaker. He currently serve as a member representing Isuikwuato State Constituency at the Abia State House of Assembly.
