= Nigerian Legion =

Nigerian veterans' organization

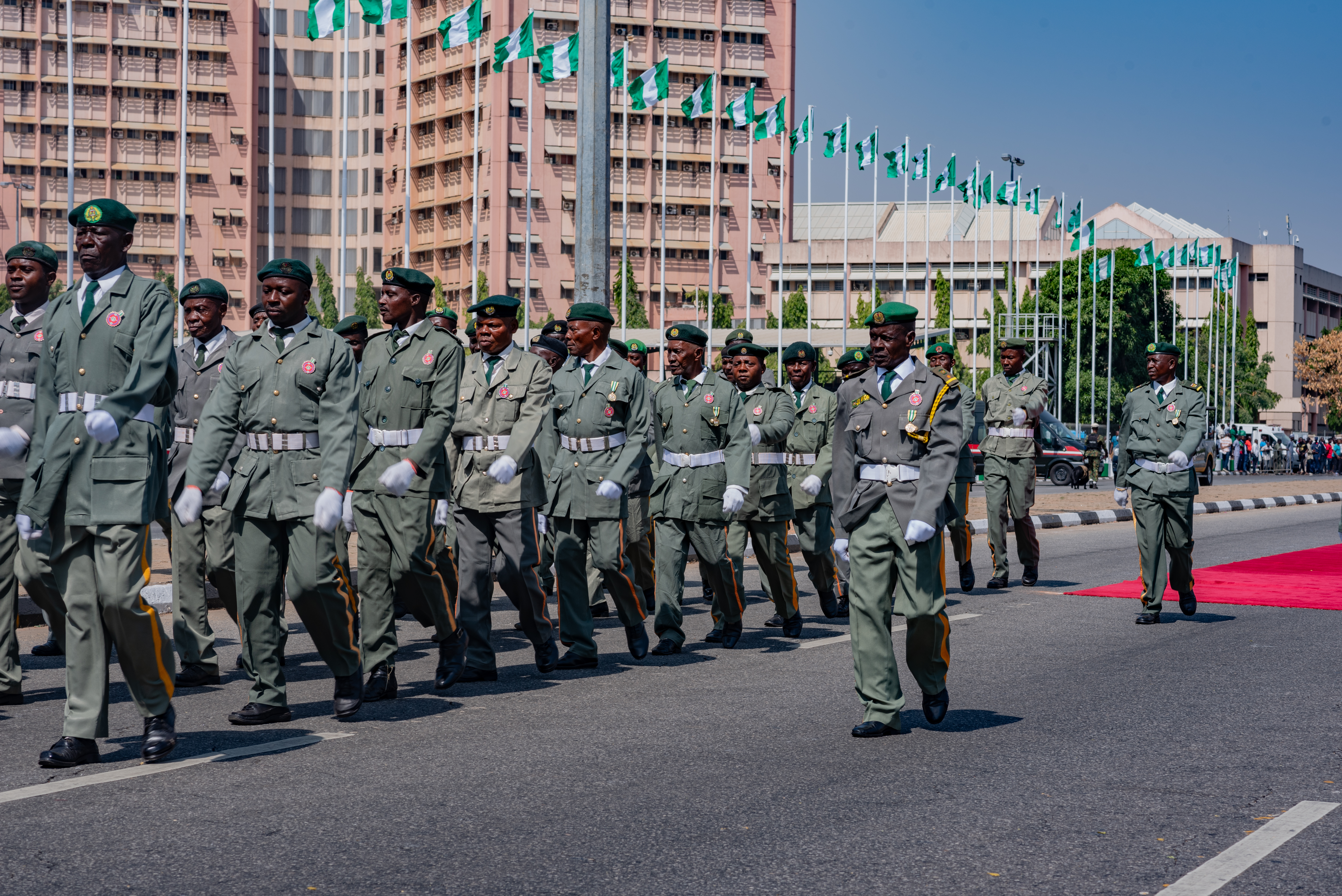
- A contingent from the Nigerian Legion during the Armed Forces Remembrance Day parade in 2020.
- Abbreviation: NL
- Formation: 1964; 62 years ago
- Type: Veterans' organization
- Legal status: Nonprofit organization
- Headquarters: Abuja
- Location: Nigeria
- Region served: Nigeria
- National Chairman: Grace Morenike Henry
- Secretary-General: Major Vincent O. Abiola
- Dominion President: Bruce Julian
- Affiliations: Royal Commonwealth Ex-Services League
- Website: www.nigerianlegionhq.org

The Nigerian Legion is a non-profit Nigerian veterans' organization founded in 1964. Members include people who served in the Nigerian Armed Forces and other reputable individuals. It is a statutory body, as outlined in the Federal Republic of Nigeria official Gazette No. 64 vol. 75 dated 30 September 1988. It is designed to address the welfare needs of veterans.

== History ==
It was established by the 1964 Act of Parliament and subsequently amended by the Nigerian Legion Interim Management Decree 25 of 1977 and Nigerian Legion Decree No. 37 of 1988.

== See also ==
- American Legion
- South African Legion
- The Royal British Legion
