= Chikwendu Kalu =

Nigerian politician

Chikwendu Kalu is a Nigerian politician. He served as a member representing the Isiala Ngwa South State Constituency and held the position of Speaker of the 7th Abia State House of Assembly.
