= Godianism =

Neo-Traditional religious movement

Godianism (also called Chiism) is a indigenist religious movement founded in 1948 or 1949 in Nigeria and originally known as the National Church of Nigeria. It propagates an intellectual awakening of the African people and traditional African religions, especially Igbo faiths, as a world religion. The Organization of Traditional Religions of Africa (OTRA) is a pan-African association which is affiliated with the movement. "It is known for its promotion of world peace."

== History ==
The founder and Supreme Spiritual Teacher (Chief) of Godianism was Ahanyi, Kalu Onu Kama Onyioha. He stated his intention was to correct the notion that traditional African religions are "pagan".

The religion has since spread to other parts of West Africa, particularly Ghana. Vincent Kwabena Damuah, a former Catholic priest, and former member of the Provisional National Defence Council of Ghana after the coup by Jerry Rawlings in 1982, wrote a booklet entitled Miracle at the shrine: Religious and Revolutionary miracle in Ghana, under the name Osofo Okomfo Damuah, to help spread the new faith in Ghana.

Since its inception in Nigeria during the fight for independence from Great Britain, Godianism has changed from a movement founded with pronounced political motives to a movement with strong cultural and philosophical aspects.

== Principles ==
The religion holds that Chineke is the creator of the universe. Igbo people of Eastern Nigeria believe the Igbo language as being one of the languages used by Chineke with which to communicate with mortals, including in the faith's book, called the Nkomii. The major Abrahamic faiths, including Judaism, Christianity, and Islam, are all said to be derived from the original teachings contained in this book.

The purpose of Godianism is to rejuvenate the person spiritually to enable them to exist in harmony with the rest of humanity. Adherents of Godianism believe that the movement will help African people to rejuvenate themselves in unity and solidarity. It preaches a message of universal unity and its philosophy is "biri ka'm biri" ("live and let live"). Godianism intends to bring this necessary harmony first to the people of Africa and subsequently to the world.

=== Beliefs on appearance ===
The physical bearing of a person is not only the prima facie evidence of the complexion of that person's heart but also offers them the first attraction for acceptance into a harmonious relationship with others in society. It is a cardinal point in the aesthetics of Godianism that all Godians must at all times turn out neat. Clothing is to be well washed and clean, the hair on the head should be well-cut, and the beard should be clean-shaven. The Godian must observe proper hygiene and impeccable sanitation for his surroundings. The Godian woman must have her hair neatly plaited or set. It is believed that it would be undermining the objective of Godianism to promote harmonious relationships among men if Godians had a dirty appearance.

In efforts of Godianism to promote harmony among humanity, every Chiist (Godian) encourages their neighbor to embrace personal cleanliness and to refrain from habits such as smoking and excessive drinking of intoxicants.

== The Chiist (Godian) creed ==
The entire spirit, philosophy, and purpose of Godianism are compressed into the following creed of the Godian Religion:

1. I believe in the Almighty God, Creator of heaven and earth, as my source of inspiration, strength, and as my protector.
2. I believe in the universal brotherhood of man under the fatherhood of one God; love your neighbor as you love yourself; do unto others as you would want others to do unto you; thou shall not kill; thou shall not steal; thou shall not commit adultery; thou shall not lie; and in respect and obedience to elders, just laws, and in retributive justice.
3. I believe that every human being, consciously or unconsciously, looks up to something above him as his source of inspiration and that "something" is the Almighty God.
4. I believe that the Almighty God made the world a paradise of happiness for humanity, but that man has made the world a hell for himself by too many quarrels with his fellow man over methods of God-worship.
5. I believe that the Kingdom of Heaven on earth shall come when man learns to quarrel no more with his fellow man on the excuse of difference in methods of God-worship.
6. I believe that religious concepts are inspired by man's desire to offer thanks to God for His goodness to humanity.
7. I believe that every human being has his own way, organized or unorganized, systematized or unsystematized, of expressing the necessary gratitude to God, and that in this fact every human being satisfies the purpose of religion or God-worship.
8. I believe that there is no sense in quarreling with my fellow man over his religious doctrine, belief, or methods of God-worship that differ from my own manner of satisfying the common purpose of thanksgiving to the Almighty.
9. I believe that to base the association of man with man, a nation with nation, on the ground of common religion and faith, is sheer folly.
10. I believe that every man should have the right to worship God in the way he understands best, without bitterness.
11. I believe that any attempt to force man directly or indirectly to accept any particular faith, religious doctrine, or method of God-worship rumples social harmony.
12. I believe that organized religious bodies as they are known in the world today, though the fundamental principles underlying their purposes are good, have, by each in its way canvassing to have all men embrace its doctrines, aroused unhealthy competition and mutual jealousy among themselves and blown the world into the tumultuous asylum of warring religious factions.
13. I believe that if the universal brotherhood of man and woman under the parenthood of ChinEke shall be a reality, if the Kingdom of Chineke shall come, the traditional African attitude of living and let live in all matters of religion is the indispensable catalyst.
14. I believe that deification of man has given source to the formation of the many religious organizations now competing and quarreling with one another, each in frantic attempts to get everybody to accept and hallow the man it has deified as the only son, holy prophet, and only medium through whom God's mercy and blessings should be invoked.
15. I believe that the practice of deification of man shall continue to be the source of disharmony in matters of God-worship unless it is stopped.
16. I believe that to deify any person born of a woman, a human, or to accept and hallow anyone so deified is a conspiracy against social harmony and sinful contempt for the very sanctity of God.
17. I believe that to end the deification of man and hang religion directly on ChinEke is to end the proliferation of religions and religious quarrels and in return peace among humanity.
18. I believe that the Creed of Godianism(Chiism) represents a religious civilization that needs to be propagated to save human society from total destruction.
