= Solomon Akpulonu =

Nigerian politician

Solomon Akpulonu is a Nigerian politician and the member representing Obingwa East State Constituency in the Abia State House of Assembly.
