= Chijioke Chukwu =

Nigerian politician

Chijioke Chukwu is a Nigerian politician. He was the former Minority Leader of the Abia State House of Assembly, representing the Bende North State Constituency.

== Career ==
In 2019, Chijioke was elected into the Abia State House of assembly under the platform of All Progressives Congress (APC) to represent Bende North State Constituency. After completing his tenure, he was appointed Special Assistant to the Deputy Speaker of the House of Representatives on Intergovernmental Affairs.

In 2024, he was appointed by President Bola Tinubu as a member representing the South East in the newly established North West Development Commission (NWDC).
