= Abraham Oba =

Nigerian politician

State Representative
- Constituency: Aba Central

Personal details
- Occupation: Politician

Abraham Oba is a Nigerian politician. He currently serve as a member of the Abia State House of Assembly representing Aba Central Constituency at the state assembly.
