= Godwin Adiele =

Nigerian politician

Godwin Anyamagiobi Adiele

Personal details
- Born: Godwin Anyamagiobi Adiele Ukwa West, Abia State, Nigeria
- Party: People's Democratic Party
- Occupation: Politician

Godwin Anyamagiobi Adiele is a Nigerian politician serving as the representative for the Ukwa West State Constituency in the Abia State House of Assembly, as a member of the People's Democratic Party (PDP).

== Political career ==
=== Election to the Abia State House of Assembly ===
Adiele was first elected to the Abia State House of Assembly in 2019, representing the Ukwa West State Constituency. He secured re-election in 2023, continuing his legislative duties under the PDP banner.

=== Legislative activities ===
As a legislator, Adiele has been involved in various motions and debates aimed at improving governance and addressing issues within Abia State. Notably, in November 2024, he moved a motion condemning the alleged assault on a fellow lawmaker, advocating for an apology from the state's Deputy Governor.
