= Paul Taribo =

Nigerian politician

State Representative
- Constituency: Ukwa East

Personal details
- Occupation: Politician

Paul Taribo is a Nigerian politician who currently serves as the Deputy Majority Leader in the 8th Abia State House of Assembly, representing Ukwa East State Constituency under the People's Democratic Party (PDP).
