= Chinedum Orji =

Nigerian politician

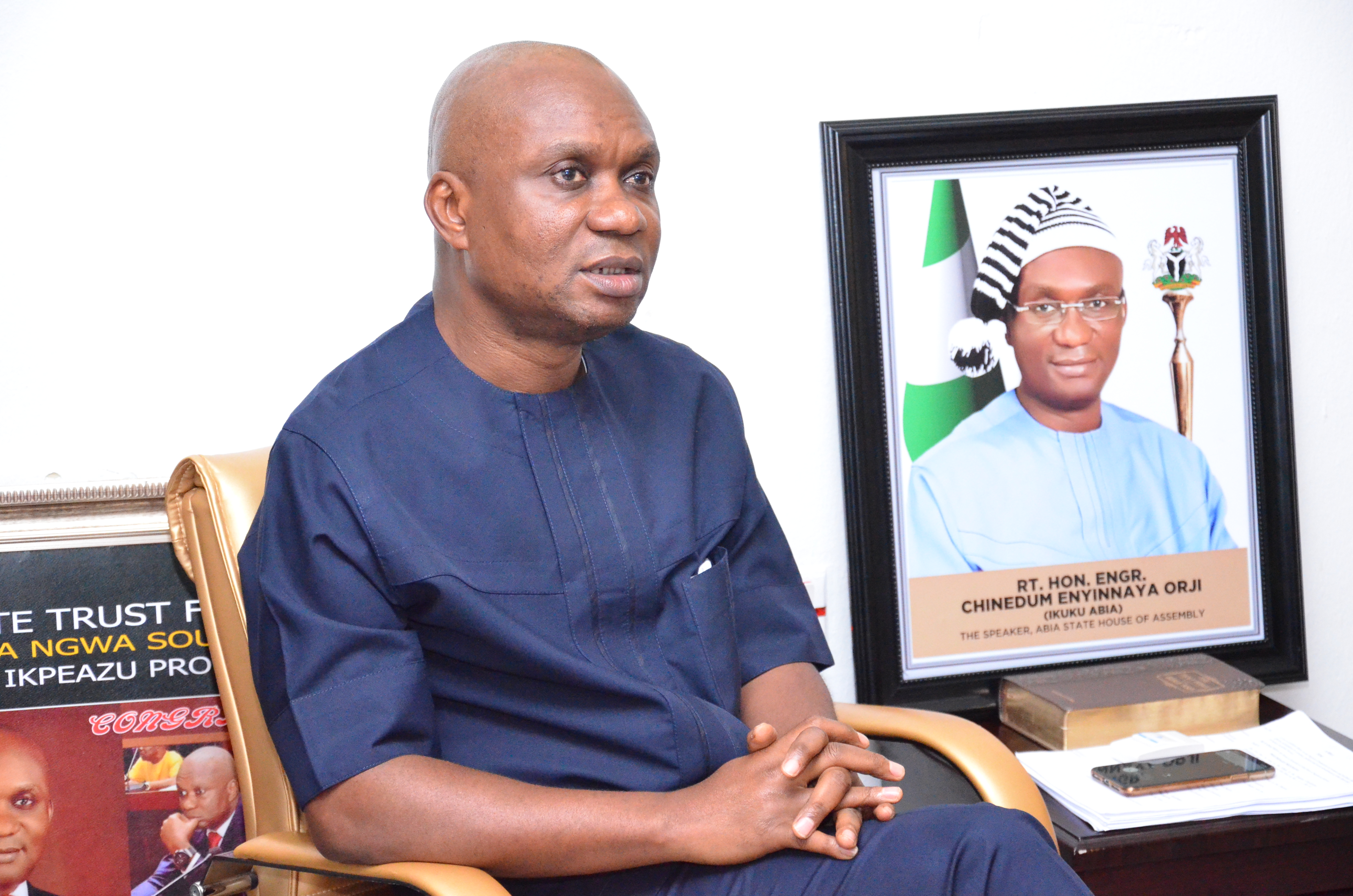

11th Speaker of the Abia State House of Assembly
- In office 10 June 2019 – 10 June 2023

Majority Leader Abia State House of Assembly
- In office 11 June 2015 – 6 June 2019

Personal details
- Born: Chinedum Enyinnaya Orji; 25 December 1970 (age 55) Abia State, Nigeria
- Party: All Progressives Congress
- Spouse: Onyinyechi Orji

Chinedum Enyinnaya Orji // (born 25 December 1970) is a Nigerian politician and former member of parliament who represented Umuahia Central State Constituency.He served as the 11th Speaker of the Abia State House of Assembly from 10 June 2019 to 10 June 2023. He was unanimously elected as the Speaker of the Abia State House of Assembly on 10 June 2019 during the Inauguration of the 7th Abia State House of Assembly.

== Early life ==
Chinedum Enyinnaya Orji was born on 25 December 1970, to the family of Senator Theodore Orji and Chief Mrs. Odochi Orji of Amaokwe in Ugba village, Ugba Autonomous Community in Umuahia North Local Government Area of Abia State, Nigeria. Chinedum attended Ugba Community Primary School, Umuahia Ibeku between 1976 and 1982, from where he proceeded to Government Secondary School, Owerri, between 1982 and 1987. He gained admission into the Federal University of Technology Owerri where he graduated with a bachelor's degree in Civil Engineering in 1996.

== Career ==
Chinedum Enyinnaya Orji is a Member of the Nigerian Society of Engineers (MNSE), the umbrella organization for the Engineering Profession in Nigeria.

== Political career ==
Before he threw his hat into the ring of politics, Rt Hon Chinedum E. Orji MNSE had carved a niche for himself as a philanthropist extraordinaire who touched the lives of the people through his numerous philanthropic interventions that saw to the execution of projects and donation of items that directly touched the lives of the people through his Direct Touch Initiative which also saw to the empowerment of many Abians particularly the youth and women through skills acquisition for which he has received many awards and commendations.

Having endeared himself to the people, it became easy for him to emerge as the Lawmaker representing Umuahia Central State Constituency at the Abia State House of Assembly at the 2015 general elections and served as Majority Leader of the House till 2019 when he was re-elected into the 7th Assembly. On 10 June 2019, Chinedum Enyinnaya Orji emerged as Speaker of the 7th Abia State House of Assembly making him the number three citizen of the State. He is a member of the People's Democratic Party. Orji ran for Ikwuano/Umuahia North/Umuahia South Federal Constituency of Abia State in the 25 February 2023 House of Representatives election but lost to his opponent Obi Aguocha of the Labour Party who polled 48,199 votes to defeat Orji who scored 35,195 votes.

=== Bills and projects ===
In 2019, Chinedum Orji started the renovation of the Abia State House of Assembly. It was his first project in his second term in office. Orji also facilitated the live streaming of Plenary sessions was commended by several media platforms. During his leadership the Abia State House of Assembly passed the Abia State House of Assembly Service Commission Bill (HAB1 2019) into law. The Abia State House of Assembly Commission Service bill grants the house financial autonomy. As speaker of the Abia State House of Assembly, he passed over 17 bills which included the Bills on financial autonomy of the Abia State House of Assembly, the Abia State Agency for free home healthcare services and the Abia State security bill. The Abia State Protection Agency Bill 2019 was also passed into law as well as the Abia State Safety Commission Bill, Abia State Donor Agencies Trust Fund Bill, Abia State Violence Against Persons Prohibition Bill 2019, Abia State Marketing and Quality Management Agency Bill 2019 and the Abia State Specialist Hospital and Diagnostic Centre Umuahia Bill 2019.

=== Defection to All Progressives Congress ===
Orji joined the national ruling party, the All Progressives Congress (APC) in 2024 following his resignation from the PDP citing the party’s shift from the core ideology it was founded and the activities of the party before and after the 2023 general elections which “were detrimental to the peace, progress, and cohesion of the party, resulting in catastrophic political losses”.

In January 2026, he was named Abia State chairman of The City Boy Movement, a pro national ruling party, APC and president Bola Tinubu focused on mobilization of grassroots support for the re-election of president Tinubu.

== Corruption allegations and EFCC investigation ==
In February 2020, the Economic and Financial Crimes Commission announced an investigation into Orji, his father Theodore, and his brother Ogbonna based on a petition the commission received in 2017. The petition, filed by the Fight Corruption: Save Nigeria Group, outlined over ₦500 billion in public funds that were allegedly stolen by the Orji family while Theodore served as Abia State Governor from 2007 to 2015. The money supposedly consisted of ₦383 billion from federal accounts, ₦55 billion in excess crude revenue, ₦2.3 billion from SURE-P funds, ₦1.8 billion from ecological funds, a ₦10.5 billion First Bank loan, a ₦4 billion Diamond Bank loan, a ₦12 billion Paris Club refund, a ₦2 billion agricultural loan for farmers, and ₦55 billion in Abia State Oil Producing Areas Development Commission funds along with other government money including a ₦500 million monthly security fund. Later in February 2020, both Theodore and Chinedu Orji were interrogated as the investigation found that Chinedu had around different suspicious 100 bank accounts that could have been used to hide the stolen money.

On 19 August 2021, Theodore was arrested at the Nnamdi Azikiwe International Airport after he failed to abide by his release conditions and forfeit his passport to the EFCC. Later that day, Chinedu turned himself in and was taken into custody. Both were interrogated before being released on bail and told to return for future questioning.

== Sun Newspapers Public Service Award ==
On 17 October, Chinedum Enyinnaya Orji was honoured with The Sun Public Service Award 2020 award, by The Sun Publishing Ltd, publishers of The Daily Sun Newspapers for touching lives

== Personal life ==
Chinedum Enyinnaya Orji is a Knight of the Anglican Communion. Orji has also obtained a fellowship from the Nigerian Society of Engineers where he has been a member since 2014.
