= Abia State House of Assembly =

Legislative arm of a state government in Nigeria

Coordinates: 5.5284°N 7.5138°E

- 7th Abia State House of Assembly

Type
- Type: Unicameral

Leadership
- Speaker of the Abia State House of Assembly: Emeruwa Emmanuel (LP)
- Deputy Speaker: Austin Okezie Meregini (LP)
- Majority Leader: Nigeria
- Majority Whip: Emeka Jacob Obioma (LP)
- Deputy Majority Whip: PDP

Structure
- Seats: 24
- Length of term: 4 years

Meeting place
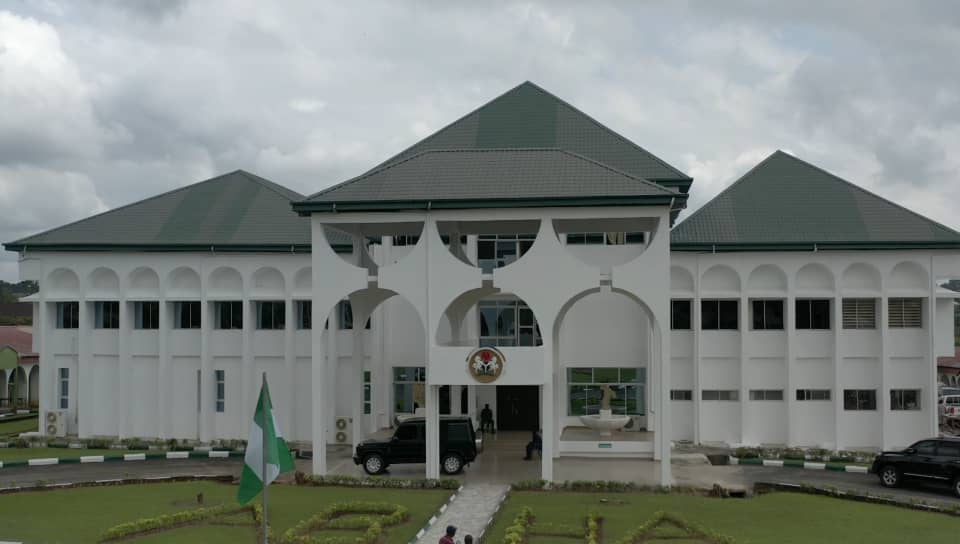
- Umuahia, Abia State

Abia State House of Assembly is the legislative arm of the Abia State Government. It is a unicameral body consisting of 24 members elected into 24 state constituencies and presided by a Speaker. The age of voting is 18.

== Composition ==
=== Leadership ===
Office	Constituency	Representative	Party
Speaker of the House	Aba South	Emeruwa Emmanuel	LP
Deputy Speaker	Umuahia East	Austin Okezie Meregini	LP
Majority Leader	Obingwa East	Solomon Akpulonu	PDP
Deputy Majority Leader	Ukwa East	Paul Taribo	PDP
Minority Leader	Aba Central	Abraham Oba	APGA
Deputy Minority Leader	Bende North	Chijioke Chukwu	APC
Majority Whip	Umuahia South	Emeka Obioma	LP
Minority Whip	Arochukwu	Mike Ukoha	APGA

=== Members ===
Constituency	Name	Political party
Osisioma South	Fyne Ahuama	LP
Umuahia North	Barr Akaliro Anderson	APC
Umuahia Central	Chinasa Anthony	LP
Isiala Ngwa North	Ugochukwu Iheonunekwu	PDP
Isiala Ngwa South	Rowland Ceaser	PDP
Isuikwuato	Lucky Johnson	PDP
Ukwa East	Lewis Obianyi	PDP
Ukwa West	Godwin Adiele	PDP
Obingwa East	Solomon Akpulonu	PDP
Umunneochi	Ume Mathias	LP
Umuahia East	Austin Okezie Meregini	LP
Umuahia South	Emeka Jacob Obioma	LP
Ikwuano	Boniface Isienyi	LP
Ugwunagbo	Chijioke Uruakpa	PDP
Obingwa West	Erondu Uchenna Erondu	PDP
Ohafia North	Mandela Obasi	PDP
Osisioma North	Nwogu Iheanacho	LP
Aba Central	Ucheonye Stephen	LP
Aba North	Destiny Nwangwu	LP
Arochukwu	Okoro Uchenna Kalu	LP
Ohafia South	Nwoke Kalu Mba	LP
Bende South	Emmanuel Ndubuisi	PDP
Bende North	Nnamdi Ibekwe	PDP
Aba South	Emeruwa Emmanuel	LP
