= Ugochukwu Bond Anyaehie =

Nigerian professor of physiology

Ugochukwu Bond Anyaehie is a Nigerian professor of physiology and clinical measurements. Since 2025, he has served as Vice Chancellor of Nnamdi Azikiwe University.

== Education ==
He is a graduate of Abia State University, Uturu, where he obtained his first degree in medicine and surgery in 1998. He obtained his second degree and PhD in 2004 and 2009 respectively.

== Career ==
In 2002, Anyaehie started his teaching profession career at the College of Medicine, Imo State University as an adjunct lecturer before been hired as a full-time lecturer at the University. In 2007, he joined the College of Medicine at the University of Nigeria, becoming a professor in 2013. Between 2018 and 2022 Anyaehie served as the deputy provost of the College of Medicine, University of Nigeria, and as the acting provost of the College of Medicine at Imo State University, prior to his appointment as the substantive Vice-Chancellor of the Nnamdi Azikiwe University on 16 November 2025.
