= Raymond Nkemdirim =

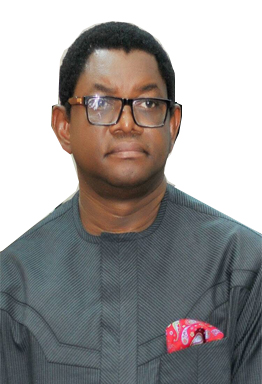
- Former Director Operations, Department of State Services (DSS), Nigeria
- Born: Umuobiala in Isuikwuato Local Government Area of Abia State
- Occupation: Security Expert
- Parent(s): Mr. Brown Ogbonnaya Nkemdirim and Floris

Raymond Iheanacho Nkemdirim is a former director of operations of the Department Of State Security Services DSS and Special Assistant to the Director-General, DSS, a position he held until 2015. He joined the then Nigerian Security Organisation (NSO) in 1979. In 1986, the NSO was re-organized and the State Security Service (SSS) emerged, he transferred his service to the SSS.

As security intelligence administrator, Raymond served in Nigeria's intelligence service for 35 years. He retired as Director of Operations. At the end of his service, he was retained on contract as Special Assistant to the head of Nigeria’s primary domestic intelligence agency.

== Biography ==
Ray Nkemdirim MFR commenced his early education in 1966 at the Seventh Day Adventist Primary School, Ama-Achara, Umuahia.

With the outbreak of the civil war, he moved to Sierra Leone where he continued his primary school education at the Military Primary School, Freetown, Sierra Leone. On completion of his primary education, he moved on for his secondary education to the Albert Academy, Freetown, Sierra Leone in 1973. In 1975, five years after the end of the civil war, he returned to Nigeria to continue his secondary education. First, he was enrolled at Boys High School, Awkunanaw, Enugu State, and subsequently at Emmanuel College, Owerri.

For his higher education, he proceeded to Imo State University (now Abia State University) then located at Etiti in Imo State, where he studied Sociology between 1982 and 1986. He went on to enrol at the University of Abuja, where he studied and obtained a degree in Law in 2002. Prior to going to the university for higher education, he had, in 1979 joined the then Nigerian Security Organisation (NSO). In 1986, the NSO was re-organized and the State Security Service (SSS) emerged, he transferred his service to the SSS.

He rose in his career to hold the position of State Director of Security (SDS) in several States, including Bayelsa, Oyo, Kwara and Bauchi respectively.

He also participated in the Policy, Strategy and Leadership Course of the National Institute for Policy and Strategic Studies (NIPPS), Jos, Plateau State. He attended the Institute for Security Studies, (ISS), Abuja, where he emerged as the best graduating student and was awarded fellow of the Security Institute. He is also an alumnus of Harvard University in where he went to study National and International Security.

== Awards ==
Member of the Order of the Federal Republic of Nigeria, (MFR)

== Lectures ==
Raymond wrote on Rethinking Intelligence Management And Security In Nigeria for the Nigerian Defence College conference in February 2017. In the paper presentation, he advised that Nigeria must reform its intelligence management structure to suit its particular security threats, especially the rise of Boko Haram, Niger Delta militants and recently the Fulani herdsmen attack. Nkemdirim said the first step will be to set up an Intelligence Agencies Reform Committee to overhaul the operations of intelligence services in the country. On 11 November 2017, he delivered a lecture "Credible Intelligence Gathering" at Isuikwuato Local Government at Nigerian Army Language School, 143 Battalion, Ovim, Abia State.

Raymond Nkemdirim recently delivered a lecture during the South West Security Management Course in Lagos titled Intelligence-led security analysis of bandits and violent extremists, where he challenged the governors of South West Nigeria to rise to the challenge of increasing activities of armed bandits and violent extremism in their respective states.

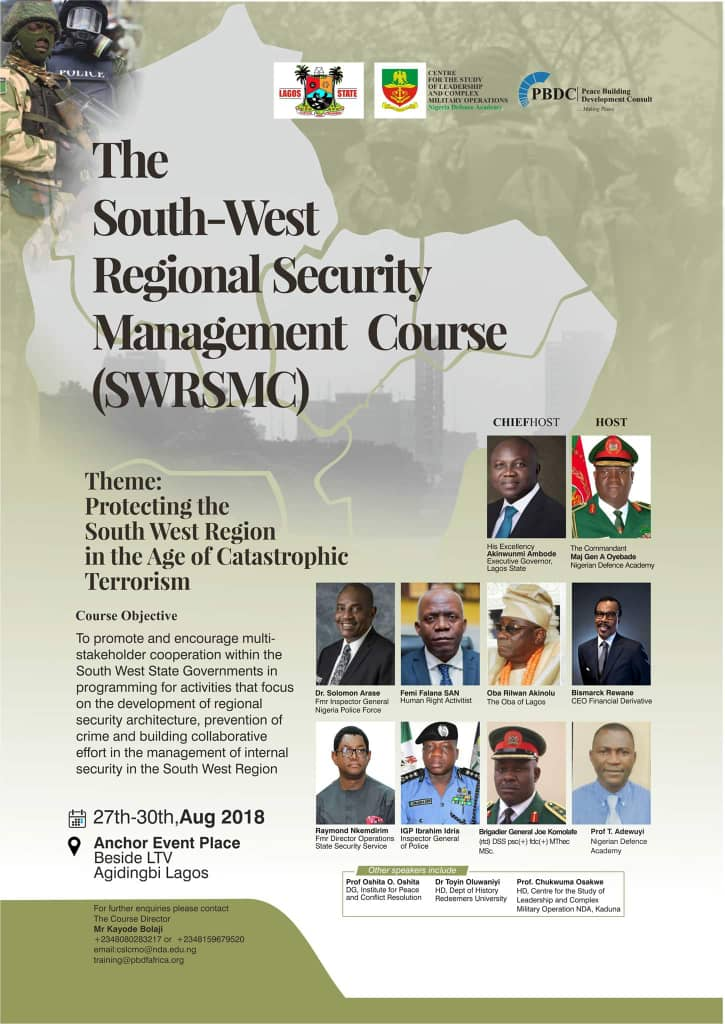
Banner designed for the SOUTHWEST REGIONAL MANAGEMENT COURSE held in Lagos, Nigeria.

Lecture in 2018.[4] At the lecture, challenged Nigeria security agencies to strictly enforce the implementation of intelligence analysis in relation to the activities of bandits and violent extremists in order to realise a safer and more secure South West region.

Nkemdirim in the paper said there is every need for Heads of the Nigeria Police and other intelligence agencies in the sub-region to meet regularly in order to work out joint strategies to mitigate security concerns within the region.

He also delivered a lecture titled "Current Security Challenges and The Way Forward" at an event in Abuja Nigeria where he said the gory killings being unleashed by Fulani herdsmen across Nigeria and the apparent lack of willingness of the security apparatus to bring the perpetrators to book, has forced Nigerians to be doubtful about government’s claim of being genuinely committed to safeguarding lives and property.

Raymond further challenged the government to take adequate step(s) toward reassuring Nigerians that all hope is not lost in the face of the prevailing security challenges .

On November 26, 2018, Raymond was invited to speak at the South East Regional Security Management Course in Anambra State, Nigeria and in a paper titled, "Analytic Frameworks For Explaining And Predicting Decisions In Security Issues" he posits that "violent extremism in the South East region, comprising the 5 states of Abia, Anambra, Enugu, Imo and Ebonyi can effectively be tackled using tested analytic security frameworks. He also said, "The South East is one of 6 regions in Nigeria that has had its fair share of knocks from the activities of bandits and other men of the underworld on a fairly constant basis over the years".

He was recently quoted by the media, saying Nigeria is grossly under-policed and that the nation’s police personnel of some 371,000 to 200 million Nigerians is “a far cry” from the UN standard benchmark of one policeman to 400 people.

Raymond has also through his foundation, The Ray Nkemdirim Foundation (RNF), sponsored schools quiz competition, which according to him is a strategic action for supporting the Abia State government in promoting education and motivating students and pupils towards sustained interest in learning.
