= Kevin Ibeh =

- Born: Nigeria
- Occupation: Academic

Academic background
- Education: Abia State University, Uturu, Nigeria; University of Nigeria, Enugu, Nigeria; University of Strathclyde, Glasgow, UK

Kevin Iyk Ibeh is a British-Nigerian academic, author and speaker. He is the Pro Vice-Chancellor (International) at Birkbeck, University of London, and a Commissioner of the Commonwealth Scholarship Commission. He is most known for his work on firm internationalization and developing economies, as well as his work on how non-dominant firms, including small and medium-sized enterprises (SMEs) and entrepreneurial firms, capitalize on growth opportunities internationally. Among his authored works are publications in academic journals, including Journal of World Business, Journal of Business Ethics, British Journal of Management, Journal of Business Research, International Business Review, and European Journal of Marketing as well as books such as Contemporary Challenges to International Business and Growth Frontiers in International Business.

== Education ==
Ibeh gained his BSc in Marketing from the Abia State University in 1987, followed by an MBA from the University of Nigeria in 1990. He obtained an MSc in International Marketing from the University of Strathclyde, Glasgow, in 1995 and PhD in Marketing from the same institution in 1998. His PhD supervisor was Stephen Young.

== Career ==
Ibeh held various positions at Abia State University between 1988 and 1994 before leaving for further studies at the University of Strathclyde, UK, where he gained MSc and PhD degrees under the supervision of Neil Hood and Stephen Young. After joining the University of Strathclyde's faculty as a Lecturer in 1998, he became Professor of Marketing and International Business in 2006. Subsequently, he served as Director of Research in the Department of Marketing from 2007 to 2010. From 2010 to 2013, he served as both a professor and the Head of the Department of Marketing at the University of Strathclyde. Later, he held appointments as Head of the Department of Management and Deputy Dean of the School of Business, Economics, and Informatics at Birkbeck, University of London, from 2013 to 2020. Since 2017, he has served as Pro Vice-Chancellor (International) at Birkbeck, University of London.

Ibeh has served in consulting and advisory capacities in supranational and national policy organizations. These include The World Bank, OECD, UNCTAD, African Union, and British Council, UK. He holds advisory board roles in the Commonwealth Scholarship Commission, The European International Business Academy, Warwick University Africa Hub, Oaklands College Corporation, and Society for Black Academics. His appointment as Commissioner of the Commonwealth Scholarship Commission in 2021 drew positive reception and acknowledgment from the then Nigeria's president, Muhammadu Buhari. He chaired the Universities UK International sub-Saharan Africa Policy Network (2018–2020), Academy of International Business UK and Ireland Conference (2015–2016), McGill International Entrepreneurship Conference (2015), and International Academy of African Business & Development Conference (2005–2007).

Ibeh is the Lead Series Editor of Palgrave Studies of Entrepreneurship in Africa. He previously chaired the selection panel for the Journal of African Business Best Paper Award, judged the Emerald/ACLS Research Prize for Management Research in Africa, and served as a research expert for Elgar Publishers and Price Waterhouse Coopers/Insider Magazine/SBS-sponsored Scotland PLC Awards (Global Reach Category).

== Research ==
Ibeh has focused on advancing the understanding of strategic, organizational, and policy factors influencing the performance of smaller enterprises, entrepreneurial firms, and non-dominant entities in international markets and sustainable development.

=== Firm internationalization and success ===
Ibeh has made contributions to research on firm internationalization. His 2000 paper on internationalization in the small firm, published in the edited book Enterprise and Small Business, was praised as "an excellent piece of work" by Keogh and as a very valuable and compelling discourse by Madichie (2008). The chapter shed light on the internationalization concept, discussing how small firms internationalize, relevant internationalization theories, factors that drive internationalization, key success factors, and effective policy approaches for facilitating internationalization among smaller firms. An analysis of the top barriers to such internationalization and policy responses for addressing these barriers was the focus of a 2009 report to the OECD by him and co-authors, Lloyd-Reason and Deprey. Another collaborative work, with Colin Wheeler and Pavlos Dimitratos, reviewed and synthesized UK export performance research from 1990 to 2005. The paper, published in the International Small Business Journal, developed an integrated model and multi-theory approach to redress previous theoretical fragmentation and discussed relevant management and policy implications.

Ibeh conducted a series of studies, including projects involving internationalizing firms originating from several countries. These include Nigeria, the UK, India, China, the Baltic States, Greece, Syria, Tajikistan, and Kyrgyzstan. These studies have appeared in the British Journal of Management, International Business Review, Journal of Business Research, Industrial Marketing Management, and Journal of Euro Marketing. The focus on extending understanding of the dynamics of internationalization and international business is further reflected in his co-edited books, Contemporary Challenges to International Business and Growth Frontiers in International Business. The former, published in 2009, explicated major challenges to international business, including newer issues such as climate change and terrorism, and offered managerial and policy insights and strategies for effectively addressing these challenges. The latter, published in 2017, put forward approaches and strategies for advancing international business and the global economy, covering themes such as emerging markets, innovation, and ethical business practices.

=== International entrepreneurship ===
Ibeh hosted the McGill International Entrepreneurship Conference in 2015 and edited a special issue of the International Small Business Journal on the post-entry performance of international new ventures. In 2001, he authored a paper in the European Journal of Marketing, which identified reasons for the low export involvement of Nigerian manufacturing firms, establishing that firms with higher export-entrepreneurial orientation are more innovative, less risk-averse, and better at adapting to challenges. The paper also provided policy recommendations for different firm categories to improve export activities. In a related study published in Small Business Economics, he employed a contingency and export-entrepreneurial framework to examine the key factors that influenced the creation of export ventures among a sample of Nigerian small enterprises. The findings of the study indicated that an entrepreneurial orientation was positively correlated with improved export venturing and was the suitable strategic stance for small firms operating within challenging environments. Furthermore, his 2004 paper highlighted the critical role of decision-makers' backgrounds and experience in fostering export entrepreneurship among underperforming firms in developing countries, emphasizing the importance of these firms acquiring qualified managerial personnel to achieve international success. The influence of managerial as well as organizational and relational resources and strategic orientation on international entrepreneurship activities of small and medium-sized agribusiness firms was additionally examined in a subsequent paper published in the Management International Review in 2005.

=== Micro-multinationals ===
Ibeh's international entrepreneurship research has also focused on micro-multinationals (mMNEs), which are distinguished from other types of internationally active SMEs by their higher growth potential and use of advanced modes to service, control, and manage value-adding activities in multiple international markets. A co-authored 2004 paper, with Johnson, Dimitratos, and Slow, in the Journal of International Entrepreneurship, showed that mMNEs originated from a mixture of high and low technology sectors and were mainly influenced by the search for markets and knowledge in their internationalization behavior. The paper thus urged policymakers to cast their net wider in their search for potential mMNEs. Another paper, with Borchert and Wheeler, showed how mMNEs typically overcame size-related limitations on their global ambitions by actively embracing resource-augmenting collaborations and alliances. Organizational challenges that often hindered mMNEs' ability to optimize their international growth potential were the focus of a separate contribution in an edited volume. The paper, with Dimitratos, Johnson, and Slow, advanced strategies for redressing observed challenges, including difficulty in accessing necessary financial resources and the existence of a reactive international management style.

=== African multinationals, international firms, and wider sustainable development ===
Ibeh focused on advancing the understanding of African multinationals. An article in the International Marketing Review examined the growing significance of African Multinational Enterprises (MNEs) and highlighted the importance of mission-driven motivation and the challenge of the liability of Africanness. The paper urged African MNEs to continue strengthening their positions across African markets and to leverage their regional markets and global diaspora networks as learning platforms for future expansion into more challenging global markets. Another paper, in the Journal of Business Research, examined these MNEs' approach to integrating intra-regional acquisitions and found that they preferred absorption-type approaches that enabled more control. The paper suggested this approach and an intra-regional focus as a probable safer harbor for newer MNEs, particularly given concerns about the value-creating credentials of upmarket acquisitions by emerging market MNEs. Another article in the UNCTAD's Transnational Corporations Journal examined why African MNEs undertook outward foreign direct investment activities outside their home region and found that the search for market opportunities, strategic assets/resources, and performance-boosting relationships were key motivations. The paper encouraged policy support for selective and strategic extra-regional FDI undertaken with an eye on further global competitiveness.

=== Inclusive and equitable organizational culture ===
Ibeh co-edited a special journal issue on Women, Globalization, and Global Management. His paper in the Journal of Business Ethics, which was cited in the Obama White House Council for Economic Advisers Issue Brief on "Expanding Opportunities for Women in Business", examined the extent to which the world's top business schools promoted female uptake of graduate and executive education programs, female studentship, and career advancement. The paper offered insight into the emerging best practices on this aspect of business school behavior. Another paper in the Journal of World Business compared the level of institutionalization of female talent development practices in African business schools to international best practices and found a lesser prevalence of these practices among the former. The paper also discussed policy ideas for strengthening female development orientation among African business schools.

== Awards and honors ==
- 1994 – Commonwealth Scholarship Award
- 1995 – MKO Abiola Prize
- 2011 – Elected Fellow, Chartered Institute of Marketing
- 2013 – Elected Fellow, Royal Society of Arts
- 2021 – Selected for the Accelerate Programme, National Leadership Centre, Cabinet Office, UK

== Bibliography ==
=== Books ===
- Contemporary challenges to international business (2009) ISBN 9780230218451
- Growth Frontiers in International Business (2017) ISBN 9783319488509
- The Routledge Companion to Business in Africa (2014) ISBN 9781138363045
- The Changing Dynamics of International Business in Africa (2015) ISBN 9781137516527

=== Selected articles ===
- Ibeh, K. I., & Young, S. (2001). Exporting as an entrepreneurial act‐An empirical study of Nigerian firms. European Journal of Marketing, 35(5/6), 566–586.
- Ibeh, K. I. (2003). Toward a contingency framework of export entrepreneurship: conceptualisations and empirical evidence. Small Business Economics, 20, 49–68.
- Ibeh, K.I.N., Johnson, J., Dimitratos, P., and Slow, J. (2004), "Micro-multinationals: some preliminary evidence on an emergent star of the international entrepreneurship field", Journal of International Entrepreneurship, 2(4), 289–303.
- Ibeh, K.I.N. (2005), "Toward Greater Firm-level International Entrepreneurship within the UK Agribusiness Sector: Resource Levers and Strategic Options", Management International Review, 45(3), 59–81.
- Wheeler, C., Ibeh, K., & Dimitratos, P. (2008). UK export performance research: Review and implications. International Small Business Journal, 26(2), 207–239.
- Ibeh, K.I.N., Carter, S., Poff. D. and Hamill, J. (2008), "How Focused are the World’s Top rated Business Schools on Educating Women for Global Management?", Journal of Business Ethics, 83(1), 65–83.
- Dimitratos, P., Lioukas, S., Ibeh, K.I.N., and Wheeler, C. (2010), Governance Mechanisms of Small and Medium Enterprise International Partner Management, British Journal of Management, 21(3), 754–771.
- Ibeh, K.I.N, and Kasem, L., (2011), "The Network Perspective and the Internationalisation of Small and Medium-sized Software firms from Syria", Industrial Marketing Management, 40(3), 358–367.
- Ibeh, K.I.N, and Debrah, Y. (2011), "Female Talent Development and African Business Schools", Journal of World Business, 46(1), 42–49.
