= Ezo Ukandu =

Nigerian traditional ruler

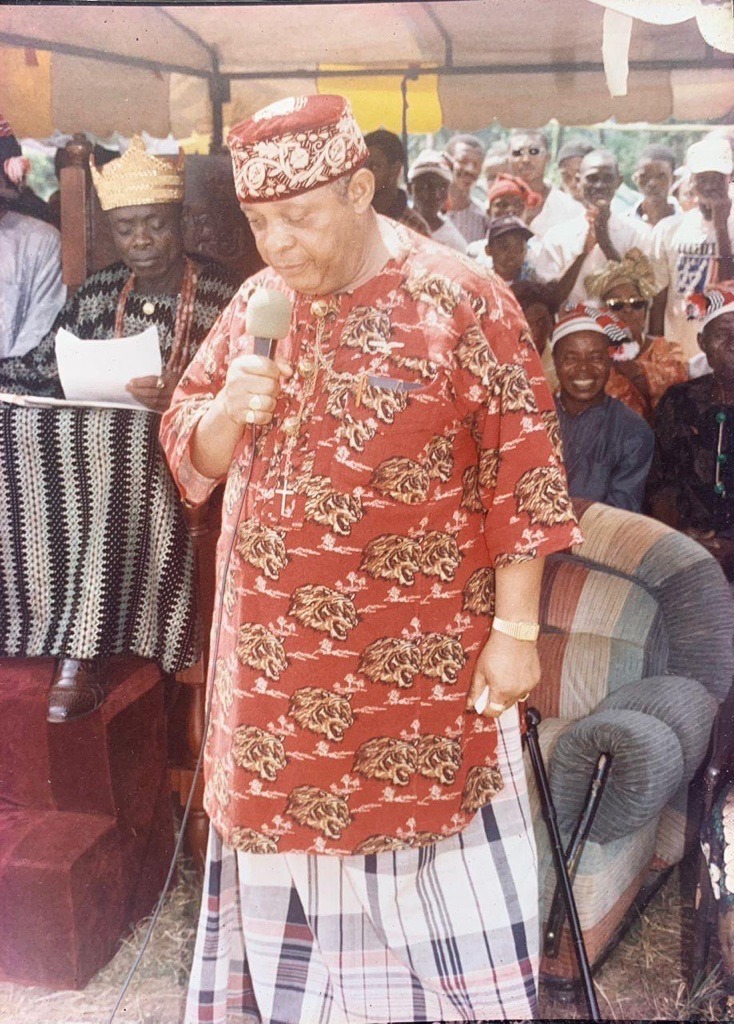
- Born: June 15, 1936
- Died: January 8, 2024 (aged 87)
- Occupations: King, and foremost chairman of South East Traditional Rulers Council
- Employer: Imenyi Ancient Kingdom
- Children: 14

Ezo Ukandu (June 15, 1936 - January 8, 2024) was a Nigerian traditional ruler who held the title of Enyi-na-Obiangwu of the Imenyi Ancient Kingdom for 48 years. He served as a Chairman of the Abia State Council of Traditional Rulers and was the first Chairman of the Southeast Council of Traditional Rulers.

== Background ==
=== Early life and education ===
Eze Ukandu was born in Ahaba Imenyi, Isuikwuato, Abia State, Nigeria, to Ezo and Nwanyibuikwu Ukandu. He was the eldest of seven children. Ukandu completed his primary education in Ahaba Imenyi and later obtained a certificate in general education, followed by a diploma in business management and public administration.

=== Institutional involvement ===
Ukandu operated several businesses in Aba, Abia State, including enterprises in hospitality and merchandise importation. He established a Deta Batteries manufacturing facility with distribution networks in Nigeria and other parts of West Africa. Through his company Ukandu Motors, he held franchises for the distribution and servicing of Peugeot, Mercedes Benz, and other vehicle brands. His business interests were consolidated under the Ukandu Group of Companies, which included:

- Ukandu Motors
- Deta Batteries
- Ukatraco
- Ukandu Farms
- Multi-System Ltd.
- Starlink Hotels
- Starlink Hostels

He participated in the founding of Abia State University, Uturu and later served as a director of the university's micro finance bank. He also contributed to the development of Sam Mbakwe Airport (formerly Owerri Airport), providing financial support during its construction.

=== Political involvement ===
In July 2019, Ukandu advocated for the next governor of Abia State to come from the Isuikwuato district, citing perceived marginalization. In November 2019, he was appointed to a four-member committee tasked with developing selection procedures for new leadership of the Abia State Council of Traditional Rulers, following its dissolution by Governor Okezie Ikpeazu.

Ukandu was appointed by Olusegun Obasanjo as a National Royal Ambassador representing the Southeast in the National Peace Forum. He also held the position of Chairman Board of Trustees of South-East Council of Traditional Rulers until his death.

== Scholarships ==
In the 1990s, Ukandu founded the Ukandu Scholarship Scheme which provides provides funding for domestic and international education. The program offers financial support to students for studies both within Nigeria and abroad. Selection criteria include academic performance and community service engagement.

== Honours and awards ==
=== Academic honors ===
- Honorary Doctor of Business Administration, Abia State University (1994)
- Honorary Doctor of Business Administration, Evangel Christian University (United States)

=== Professional memberships ===
- Fellow, Nigeria Institute of Sales Management (FNISM)

=== Religious recognition ===
- Knight of St. Christopher (KSC), Church of Nigeria Anglican Communion

=== Civil appointment ===
- Justice of Peace

Ukandu is set to be depicted in The Chronicles of Enyimba, an upcoming series about the history of Aba, a commercial center in Abia State, Nigeria. The Chronicles of Enyimba, in pre-production as of 2024, is structured as a two-season series with 40 episodes, focusing on the commercial development of Aba in the post-Nigerian Civil War period. The series plans to include depictions of Ukandu and other business figures from the era.

== Death ==
Ukandu died on January 8, 2024, at the age of 87. His funeral was scheduled for November 14–17, 2024, in Ahaba Imenyi Ancient Kingdom, Isuikwuato Local Government Area, Abia State, Nigeria. The announced program included a procession to Isuikwuato Local Government Headquarters and lying in state at Imenyi Royal Palace on November 14 and the funeral service and interment on November 15. The funeral proceedings would be concluded with an outing service on November 17.
