= Ojukwu =

Ojukwu is a family name of Nigerian origin, and may refer to:

- Bianca Odumegwu-Ojukwu (born 1968) Nigerian politician, diplomat, lawyer, and businesswoman
- C. Odumegwu Ojukwu (1933–2011), a.k.a. Emeka Ojukwu, Nigerian military officer, statesman and politician
- Ernest Ojukwu (born 1960), Nigerian professor of law
- John Ojukwu (born 1999), American football player
