= Cajetan Iheka =

Nigerian writer

- Education: Imo State University; Central Michigan University; Michigan State University
- Occupation: Writer

Cajetan Iheka is a Nigerian writer. He is a professor in the department of English at Yale University.

Iheka earned his BA degree in English education at the Imo State University in 2007. He also earned his MA degree at Central Michigan University in 2011, and earned his PhD degree at Michigan State University in 2015. He wrote the books Naturalizing Africa: Ecological Violence, Agency, and Postcolonial Resistance in African Literature, African Ecomedia: Network Forms, Planetary Politics and Horizontal Comparison: Africa, the Caribbean, and the Making of Black World Literature.

Iheka has served as editor-in-chief of African Studies since December 2022.
