= Ngodo =

- Archaeological site
- Location within Nigeria
- Coordinates: 5°51′21″N 7°30′43″E

Ngodo(Ngodo Ancient kingdom) is an Igbo community in Uturu, Isuikwuato Local Government Area, Abia State in Nigeria which houses a stone age site that provides evidence that humans inhabited the region as far back as 250,000 years ago. It was the largest handaxe factory in Nigeria, and possibly in the world.

The site at NGODO-Uturu, which lies on a dolerite ridge, was excavated between 1977 and 1981. Archaeologists were led to the site by local people who were aware of the unusual artifacts to be found. The northern end of the site held a huge accumulation of stone-age artifacts up to 6 meters in depth. There was no pottery and no polished stone tools, but there were triangular preforms for bifacial tools as well as many flakes and some cores. Handaxes, mostly broken, accounted for four out of five of the tools, and there were also cleavers, picks and sidescrapers. Based on this mix, the site has been classified as Acheulean. It is possible that these tools were rough or unsuccessful attempts, and the successful tools were carried elsewhere to be refined further.

There are three layers of occupation. The oldest and lowest holds quartz flakes, small stone tools and points. Above that is a layer with hoe-like tools, polished stone axes, red ochre, bored stone and red pottery. The top level, with dates between 2935 BC and 15 AD, held grey pottery wares.

== History ==
The site at NGODO-Uturu, which lies on a dolerite ridge, was excavated between 1977 and 1981.[3] Archaeologists were led to the site by local people who were aware of the unusual artifacts to be found.[4] The northern end of the site held a huge accumulation of stone-age artifacts up to 6 meters in depth. There was no pottery and no polished stone tools, but there were triangular preforms for bifacial tools as well as many flakes and some cores. Handaxes, mostly broken, accounted for four out of five of the tools, and there were also cleavers, picks and sidescrapers. Based on this mix, the site has been classified as Acheulean. It is possible that these tools were rough or unsuccessful attempts, and the successful tools were carried elsewhere to be refined further.[3]

There are three layers of occupation. The oldest and lowest holds quartz flakes, small stone tools and points. Above that is a layer with hoe-like tools, polished stone axes, red ochre, bored stone and red pottery. The top level, with dates between 2935 BC and 15 AD, held grey pottery wares.
