= Ogwo E. Ogwo =

Nigerian academic

Vice-Chancellor Abia State University Uturu
- In office September 2000 – September 2005
- President: Olusegun Obasanjo
- Governor: Orji Uzor Kalu
- Vice President: Atiku Abubakar

Vice-Chancellor Renaissance University
- In office 2006–2008

Pro-Chancellor Rhema University
- Incumbent
- Assumed office 2010

Personal details
- Born: Ogwo Ekeoma Ogwo; 7 June 1949 (age 76) Lafia, Nasarawa State, Nigeria

Ogwo Ekeoma Ogwo commonly known as Ogwo E. Ogwo is a Nigerian professor of marketing in the Abia State University Uturu. He was the vice-chancellor of Abia State University Uturu from September 2000 to September 2005. He is from Igbere in Bende local government area in Abia.
