= Moses Bliss =

Nigerian gospel singer (born 1995)

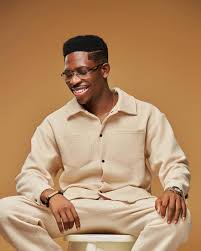

Background information
- Born: Moses Uyoh Enang; 20 February 1995 (age 31); Abuja, Nigeria
- Origin: Akwa Ibom State, Nigeria
- Genres: Contemporary worship; contemporary gospel
- Occupations: songwriter; worship leader; record label owner
- Instruments: trumpet; piano; drums; guitar
- Years active: 2017–present
- Labels: Tizzy Nation, Spotlite Nation
- Spouse: Marie Wiseborn (m. 2024)
- Website: https://mosesbliss.com

Moses Uyoh Enang (born 20 February 1995), popularly known as Moses Bliss, is a Nigerian gospel singer, worship leader and songwriter. He is the founder of Spotlite Nation, a Nigerian record label. Bliss released his first single in January 2017 titled "E No Dey Fall My Hand" and rose to prominence with the 2019 song "Too Faithful". In 2020, he won the Loveworld International Music and Arts Award (LIMA 2020) by Chris Oyakhilome for his song "You I Live for".

== Career ==
=== Music ===
Moses Bliss started to show interest in music from a very young age. By the age of 5, he was already learning and playing musical instruments. Later on, he joined the choir at Believers' Loveworld church.

Moses Bliss officially started his music career in 2017 with the debut single "E No Dey Fall My Hand". In 2019, he released the song ‘Too Faithful’ and followed it up in 2020 with the single ‘Bigger Everyday’. His first album "Too Faithful" was released in May 2021 and comprised 13 tracks including "Taking Care", "Perfection" and "E No Dey Fall My Hand". In February 2023, he released his sophomore album titled "More Than Music (Transcendent Worship", also comprising 13 tracks.

In October 2021, he was signed by "Symphonic Distribution", a music distribution company in Florida, United States. In February 2023, he unveiled his record label Spotlite Nation and signed four artists: Chizie, Festizie, Doris Joseph, and Grace Lokwa.

Every year Bliss holds a musical concert. This concert is known as Bliss Experience.

=== Business ===
Moses Bliss has a clothing brand in Abuja Nigeria known as Shades of Bliss. This brand produces classical wears for males.

== Personal life ==
In January 2024, Moses Bliss announced his engagement to Ghanaian London-based lawyer, Marie Wiseborn. Moses Bliss married Marie Wiseborn on 3 March 2024.

Moses Bliss and Marie Wiseborn welcomed their first child, a boy in January, 2025, two months before their first wedding anniversary.

== Discography ==
=== Albums ===
Year released	Title	Details	Ref
May 2021	Too Faithful	Number of Tracks: 13; Formats: Streaming, digital download	
January 2023	More Than Music (Transcendent Worship)	Number of Tracks: 13; Formats: Streaming, digital download	
March 2025	The Expression	Number of Tracks: 16; Formats: Streaming, digital download	

=== Singles ===
Year	Title	Album	Ref
2017	E No Dey Fall My Hand	Too faithful	
2019	Too Faithful	Too faithful	
2020	You I Live For	Too faithful	
2020	Bigger Everyday	Non-album single	
2021	Miracle	Non-album single	
2021	Grateful	Non-album single	
2022	Royalty	Non-album single	
2023	Mercy featuring Sunmisola Agbebi & Pastor Jerry Eze		
2023	Jesus Oh featuring Ebuka Songs		
2026	Worship My King ft Grace Lubega		
2026	Your Love ll ft Soweto Gospel Choir		

== Videography ==
- Daddy Wey Dey Pamper (2023)
- Miracle No Dey Tire Jesus (2023)
- Marvelous God (2023)
- Taking Care (remix featuring Mercy Chinwo) (2022)
- Count On Me (2022)
- Never Seen (2022)
- I Prepare (2022)
- Ima Mfo (2022)
- Taking Care (2021)
- Jesus is Here (2021)
- In Your Hands (2021)
- Too Faithful (2020)
- E No Dey Fall My Hand (2019)
- Carry Am Go (2024)

== Awards and nominations ==
Year	Award	Category	Result	Ref
2020	Loveworld International Music and Arts Award (LIMA 2020)	Best Song of the Year "You I live For"	Won	
2021	CLIMA Africa Awards	Gospel Song of the Year	Won	
2021	Gospel Touch Music Awards	Breakthrough Artist Of The Year	Won	
2022	CLIMA Africa Awards	Africa Male Gospel Artist of the Year	Nominated	
2022	CLIMA Africa Awards	Africa Gospel Songwriter of the Year	Nominated	
2022	CLIMA Africa Awards	Africa Inspirational Song of the Year	Nominated	
2022	CLIMA Africa Awards	Africa Gospel Songwriter of the Year	Nominated	
