= Uche Elendu =

Nigerian actress, singer and entrepreneur

- Born: Uche Elendu; 14 July 1983 (age 43); Abia State, Nigeria
- Education: Imo State University
- Occupations: Actress; Singer; Entrepreneur
- Years active: 2001-Present
- Spouse: Walter Ogochukwu Igweanyimba
- Children: 2

Uche Elendu (//; born 14 July 1983) is a Nigerian actress, singer and entrepreneur. She is described as one of the most consistent faces in the Nigerian movie industry from her debut in 2001 up until 2010 when she took a break from the Nigerian entertainment industry. According to a Vanguard publication, Elendu has featured in over 200 Nigerian movies. she launched her online tv Elialand.

== Early life and education ==
Elendu was born in Abia State which is located in the south-eastern geographical area of Nigeria, predominantly occupied by the Igbo people of Nigeria. Elendu is the first-born child of her parents and has three younger siblings all of whom are male. Her father is a retired civil servant and businessman whilst her mother is a teacher. Elendu graduated with a B.Sc. degree in International Relations from Imo State University.

== Career ==
Elendu officially joined the Nigerian movie industry known commonly as Nollywood in 2001. She debuted her acting career by featuring in a movie titled Fear of the Unknown. Elendu, due to marriage, took a long break from acting and this action eventually derailed and stagnated her career as an actress. In 2015 she secured the lead role in a movie titled Ada Mbano. This movie was the catalyst that re-ignited her acting career.

Elendu in an interview with The Sun discussed her futile struggles to return to the Nollywood movie industry after returning from her acting break. She further explained the pivotal role of the movie Ada Mbano and the positive effect it had on her career. In the interview, she summarized the effect of the movie on her career by saying "The movie that launched me back was Ada Mbano".

== Personal life ==
Elendu, although now divorced, got married in January 2012 in the city of Owerri, Imo State to Walter Ogochukwu Igweanyimba and both have two children together both of them female. Elendu has been involved in several auto crashes, one of which left her unconscious.

== Health ==
Elendu has spoken publicly about a medical condition called endometriosis, an ailment she had been diagnosed with.

== Selected filmography ==
- Ada Mbano (2024)
- Miss Bamidele's Girls (2022) as Lewa
- Leave My Husband (2021) as Amarachi
- Star Girl (2021) as Angela
- To All the Broken Hearted (2020) as Zainab
- King Akubueze (2014)
- Nigerian Girls (2009)
- The Rain Makers (2009) as Merit
- Twilight Sisters (2009) as Havilla
- Angelic Bride (2008) as Sandra
- Bottom Of My Heart (2008) as Ada
- Don’t Wanna Be A Player (2008)
- Give It Up (2008) as Chioma
- Yankee Girls (2008) as Nina
- Beyond The Verdict (2007) as Uche
- Johnbull & Rosekate (2007) as Rosekate
- Lost in the Jungle (2007) Ego
- Missing Rib (2007) as Rachael
- Most Wanted Bachelor (2007) as edith
- Mountains Of Evil (2007)
- Old Testament (2007)
- Before Ordination (2007) as sandy
- Brain Wash (2007)
- Chicken Madness (2006)
- Holy Cross (2006)
- Return Of The Ghost (2006)
- Occultic Battle (2005)
- Omaliko (2005)
- Security Risk (2005)
- To Love And Live Again (2005)
- Woman On Top (2005)
