= Imo State University =

University in Owerri, Nigeria

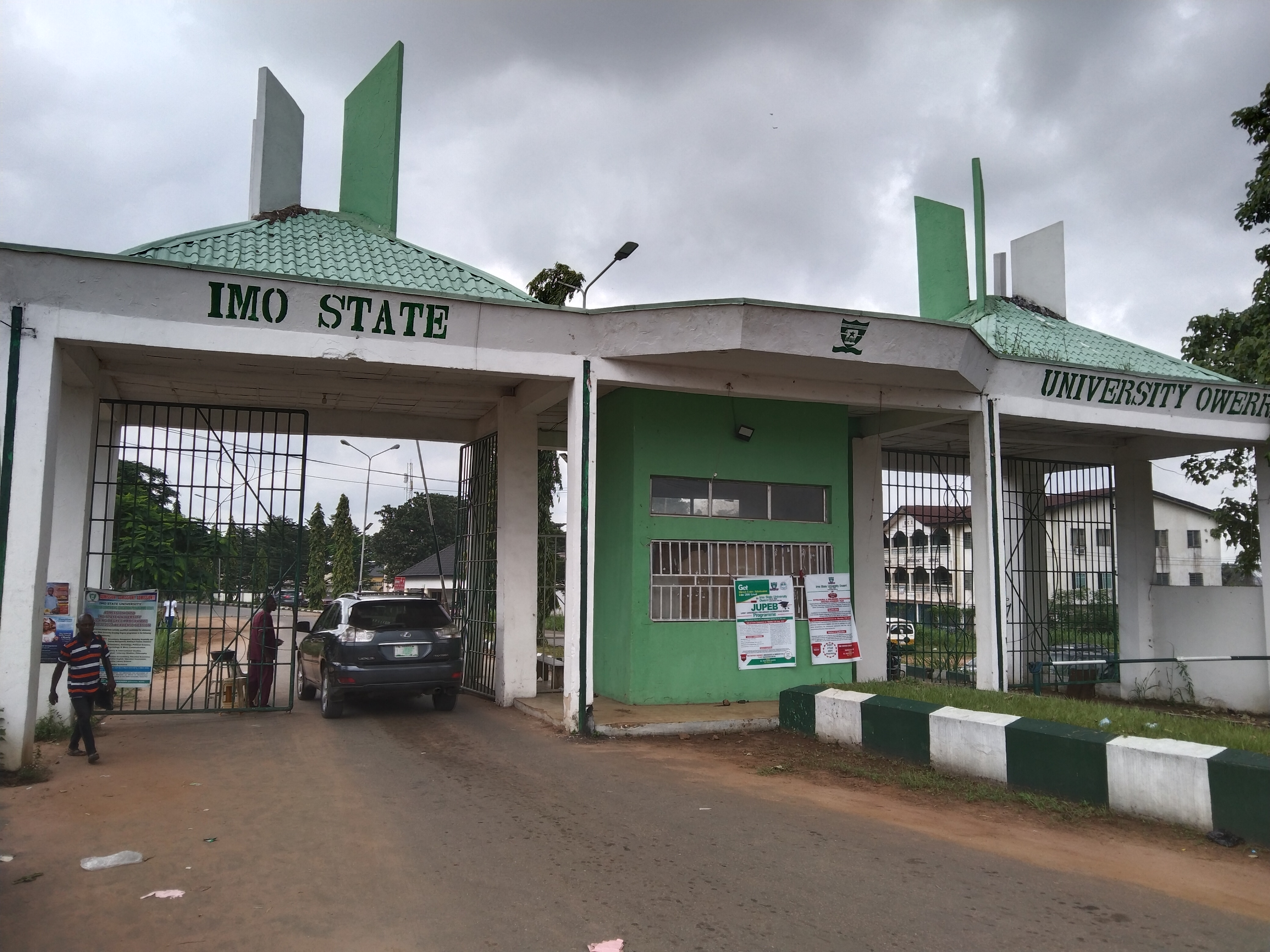
- Imo State University entrance gate
- Motto: "Excellence in service"
- Type: Public
- Established: 1981
- Vice-Chancellor: Professor Uchefula Ugonna Chukwumaeze
- Location: Owerri, Nigeria; 5°30′28″N 7°02′26″E
- Campus: Urban
- Website: www.imsuonline.edu.ng

The Imo State University (IMSU) in Owerri, Imo State, Nigeria was established in 1981 through law No. 4 passed by the Imo State House of Assembly. The university admitted the first intake of 392 pioneer students on 23 October 1981.

After the creation of Abia State in 1991, the Uturu campus of the university became the Abia State University.

Imo State University is a fully functional university. Most of the programs of the university have obtained full accreditation from National Universities Commission (NUC) of Nigeria.

The result of the 1999/2000 accreditation exercise of the National Universities Commission (NUC) confirmed the high rate and acceptance of the university by the Nigerian public.

The university was ranked first among all state universities in Nigeria and the 10th overall among both state and federal universities. Imo state indigenes in Imo State University were granted free education during the tenure of the then Governor Rochas Okorocha but the programme stopped in 2016. This was announced by the Acting Vice Chancellor of IMSU, Professor Adaobi Obasi through the Registrar, Professor Emeka Ejinkonye, who stated that the students of Imo origin would henceforth pay a token for certain services in the school especially the ancillary fee.

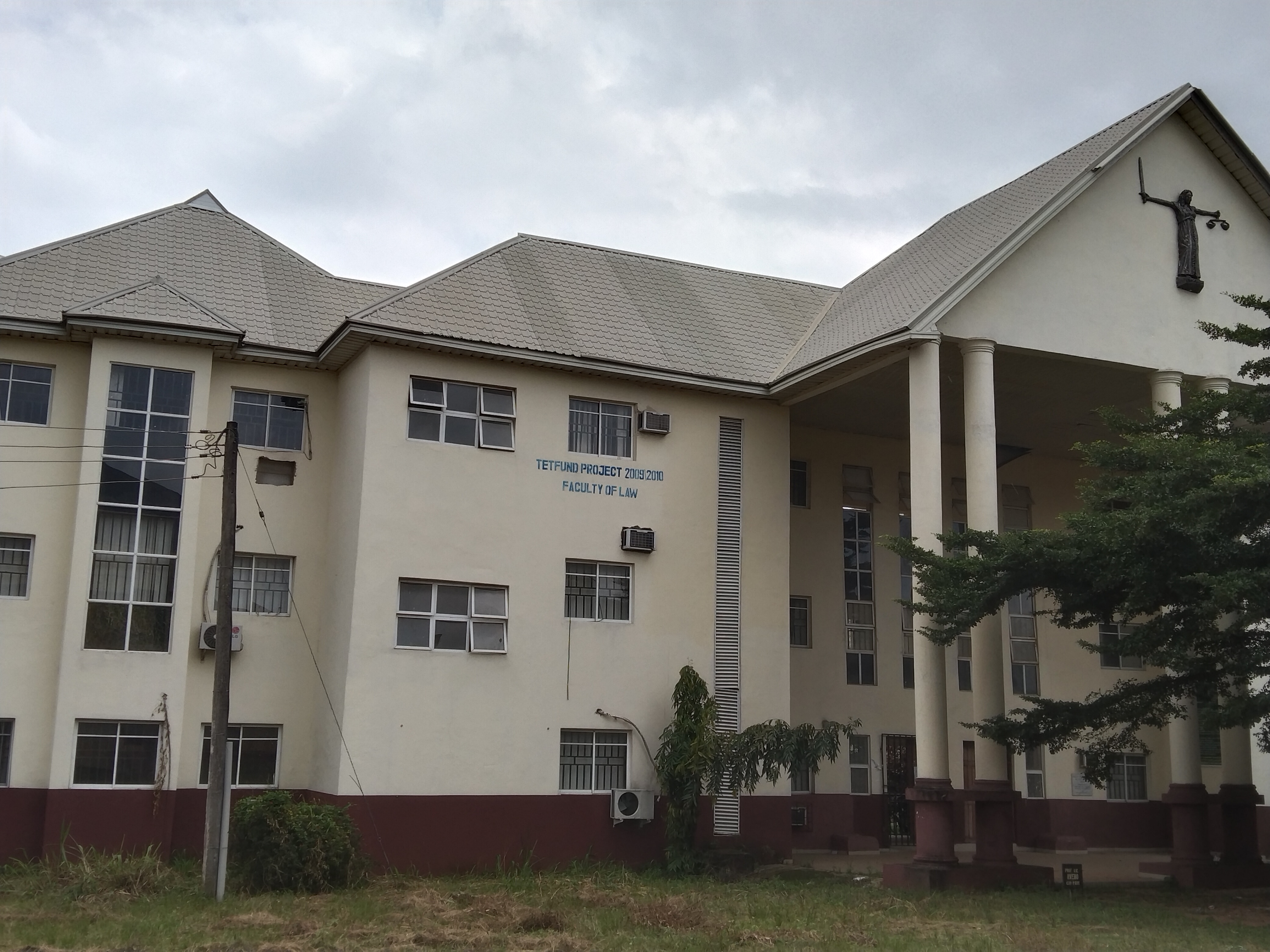
Faculty of Law, Imo State University Owerri

Initially, Imo State University was temporarily accommodated within the campus of Alvan Ikoku Federal College of Education, from May to December 1992. The university later moved to its own premises of four building within the Federal University of Technology Owerri, at the Lake Nwaebere Campus. At the translocation of the Federal University to the permanent site, Ihiagwa near Owerri, the Lake Nwaebere Campus of that university was then acquired for Imo State University.

The first batch of students was allocated to the Imo State University by JAMB in February 1993. The National Universities Commission also formally approved the re-establishment of the university in 1992 at the Lake Nwaebere Campus. Today, Imo State University has many Faculties and Departments that graduate students every year. The university produces First Class, Second Class and Third Class graduates each year. These students are absorbed into the labour force after going through one your National Youth Service Corps (NYSC). The best graduated students are usually given monetary awards and automatic employment in the university.

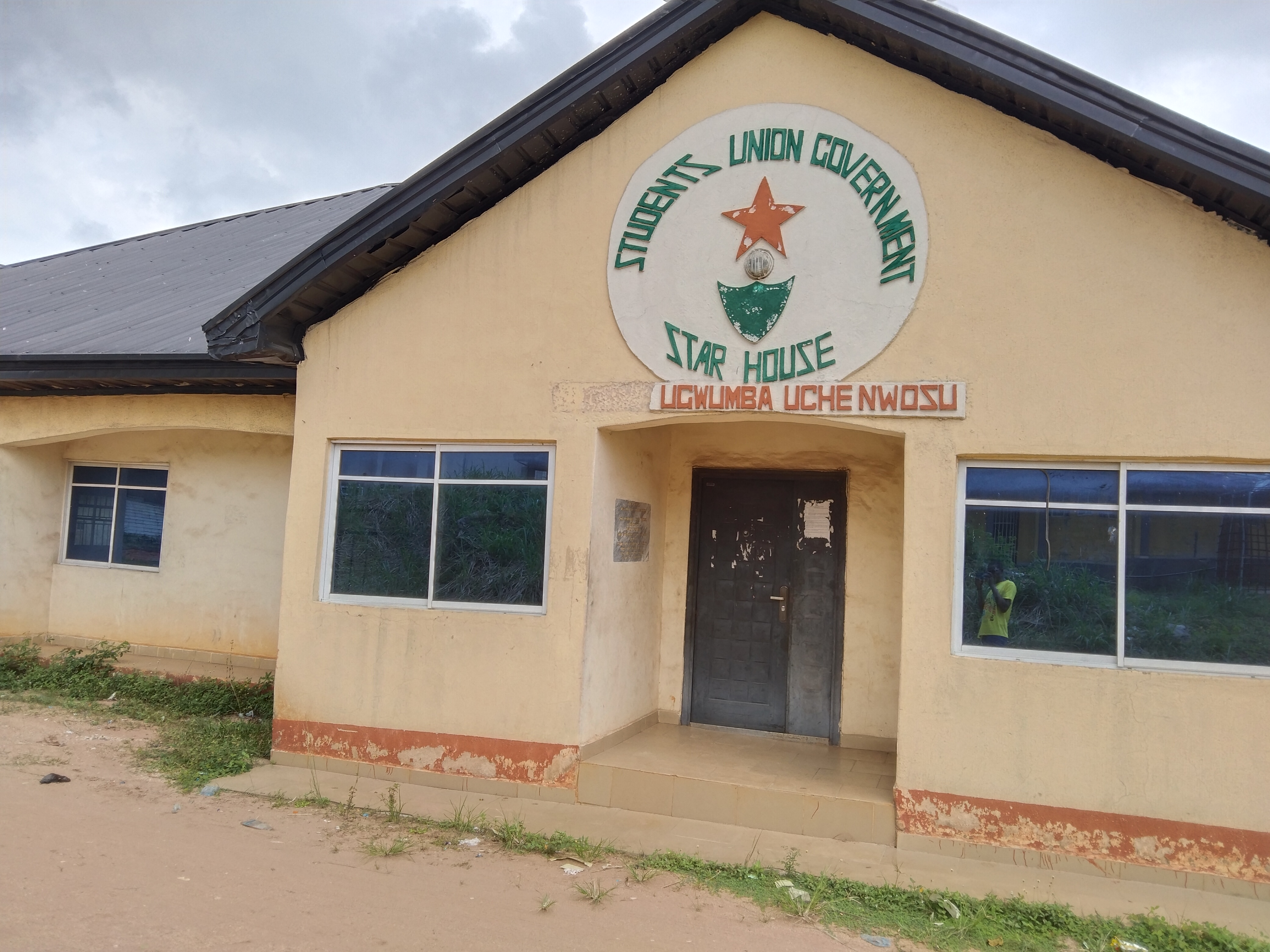
Imo State University Students Union Government(SUG) Star House, Owerri

Consequently, the government of Chief Evan Enwerem, in April 1991 did not waste time in filling the vacuum by re-establishing the university in Owerri. Two options were considered by the government in the re-establishment of Imo State University at Owerri. The first option was to move at once, all staff and students at the various stages of their programmes in Uturu who want to remain in Imo State University, now in Owerri.

The second option was to rebuild the University at Owerri over specified period of time. The second option was adopted after various constitutions by government then, and a target period of five years within which to complete re-establishment of the University at Owerri was considered. Professor T. O. C. Ndubizu, Deputy Vice-Chancellor, University of Nigeria, Nsukka was then appointed the Vice-Chancellor with the responsibility of relocating and re-establishing Imo State University.

== Academic ==
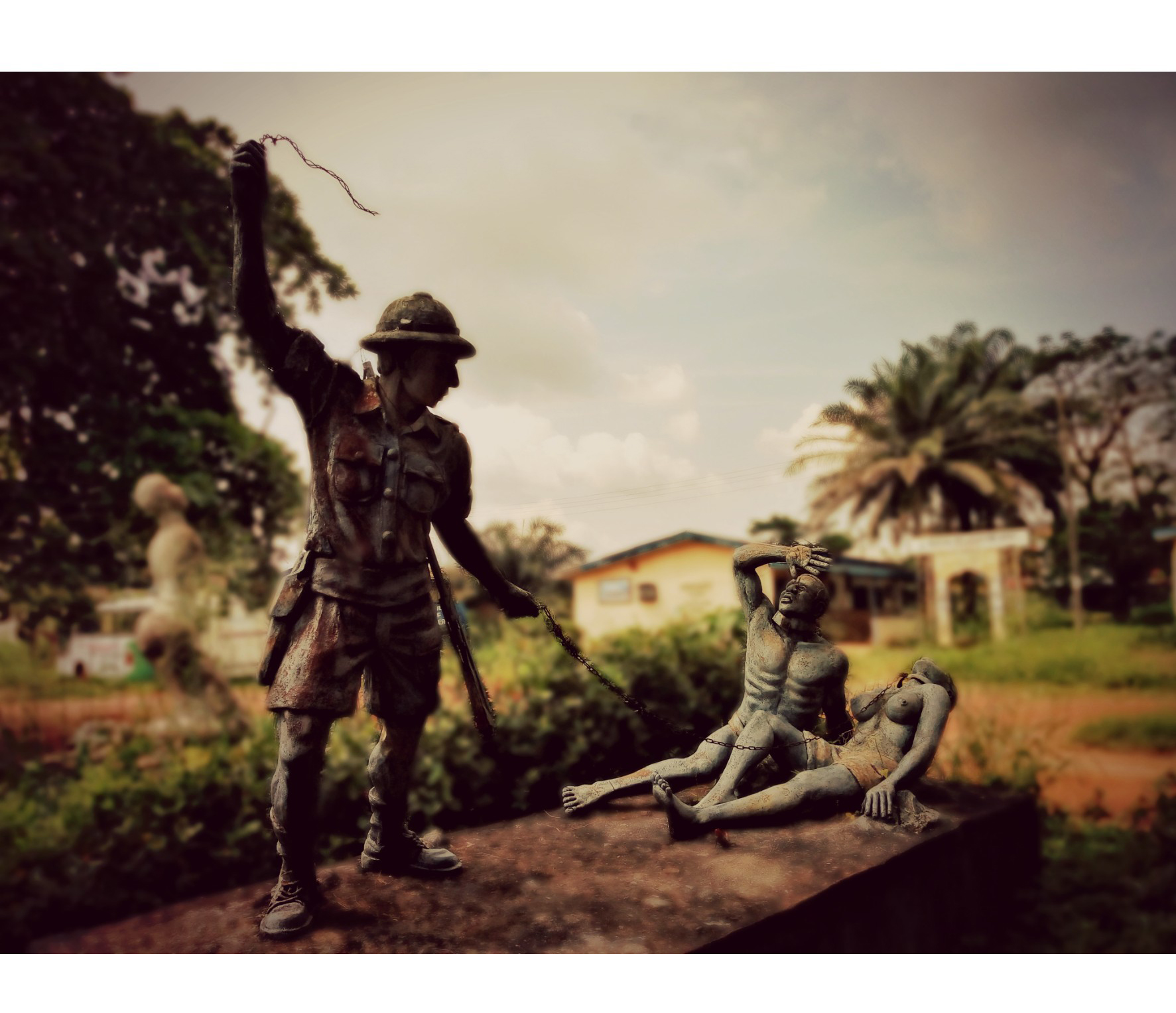
Artwork at Imo State University, Owerri

IMSU operates a faculty system and has 15 faculties. The faculties are headed by Deans and Faculty Officers. The faculties have different departments under them. The Departments are headed by the Heads of Departments (HODs) who are under the Dean of the Faculties. The lecturers, the Heads of Departments, and the Deans make up the faculty board. They are all academic members of the university, governed by Academic Staff Union of the University (ASUU). The academic staff is responsible for the curriculum and teaching of the students. They teach, set exams, mark scripts, and supervise projects.

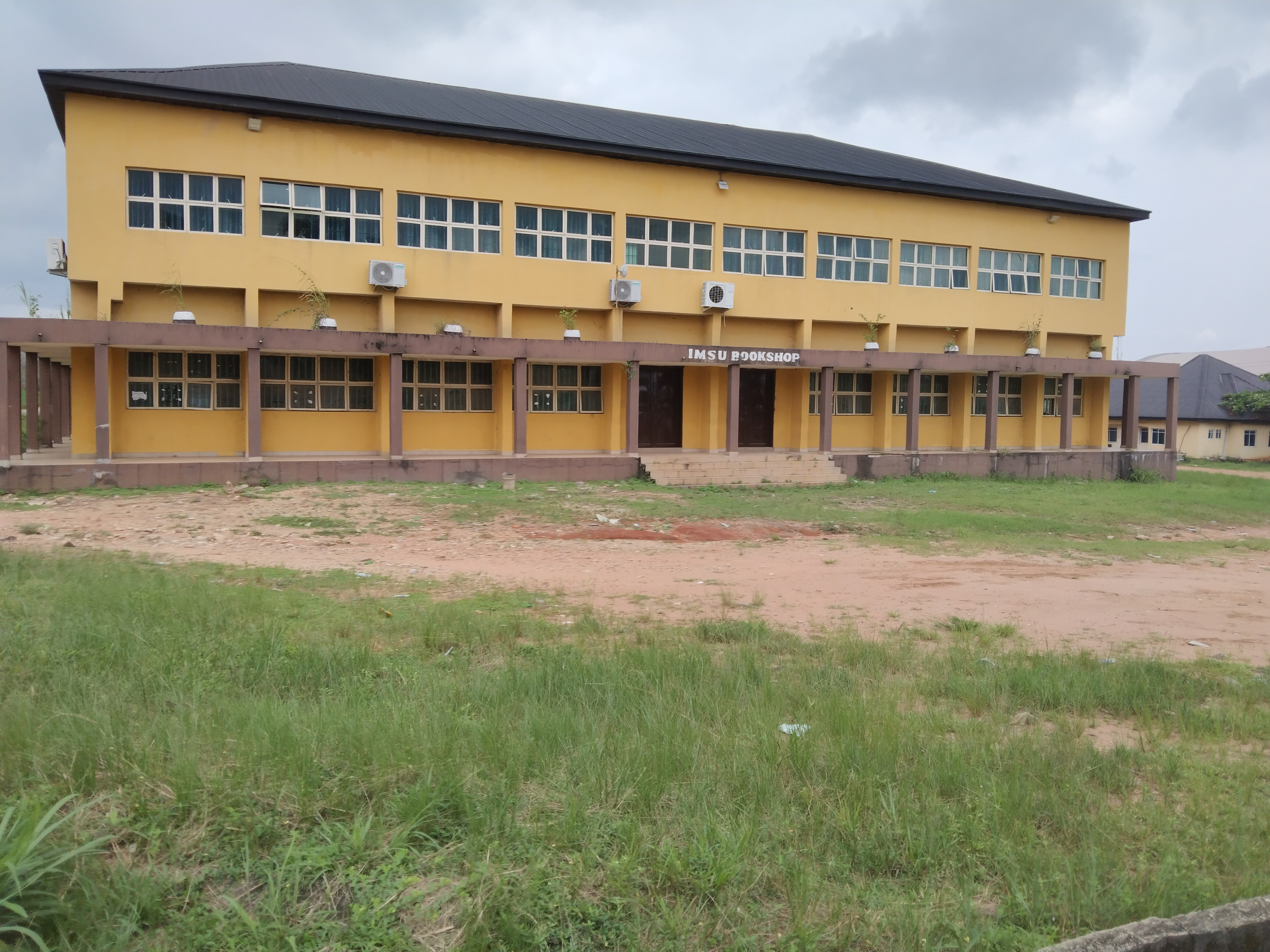
Imo State University Bookshop

Imo state University also runs Post Graduate (PG) programme for those who want to build on their First-Degree. As of 30 July 2012, Imo State has approval from the National Universities Commission (NUC) to run Post Graduate Studies (PG) for master's degree and PhD

== Notable alumni ==
- Chiedozie Akwiwu, Nigerian businessman and philanthropist.
- Anyim Pius Anyim, Nigerian politician; Former Senate President and Secretary to the Government of the Federation (SGF).
- Mercy Eke, The BBN Reality TV star.
- Uche Elendu, Nigerian actress.
- Cajetan Iheka, Nigerian writer; editor-in-chief of African Studies
- Ada Jesus, Nigerian actress and comedienne.
- Paschaline Alex Okoli, Nigerian actress.
- Joy Onumajuru, model and philanthropist.
- Ebuka Songs, gospel musician and songwriter.
- Chukwuemeka Ngozichineke Wogu, minister.
- Chris Anyanwu, Bank Manager Keystone Bank Ltd.

== Notable lecturers ==
=== Udechukwu Udeke ===
Udechukwu Udeke is a Nigerian historian specializing in Economic and Environmental History. He serves as lecturer at Imo State University, Chairman of the Governing Council of Dynamic Theological Seminary, Kwale and as Editor-in-Chief of Unicorn International Journal of Contemporary Studies.

=== Chris Okewulonu ===
Chris Okewulonu is a Nigerian barrister and Centre-right politician. He served as the Chief of Staff to Emeka Ihedioha as the Governor of Imo State from 3 June 2019 to 15 January 2020.

== Faculties in the Institution ==
Below are list of faculties at IMSU:

- Faculty of Agriculture and Veterinary Medicine.
- Faculty of Business Administration.
- Faculty of Education.
- Faculty of Engineering.
- Faculty of Environmental Science.
- Faculty of Health Science.
- Faculty of Humanities.
- Faculty of Law.
- Faculty of Medicine and Surgery.
- Faculty of Science.
- Faculty of Social Sciences.
