= Stephen Young (economist) =

Economist

- Born: 20 August 1944
- Died: 16 August 2021 (aged 76); Glasgow, U.K.
- Education: University of Liverpool (BC); Newcastle University (MS)
- Scientific career
- Fields: International business, the theory of the multinational enterprise
- Workplaces: Louisiana State University; University of Texas at Dallas; Georgetown University; University of Strathclyde; University of Glasgow
- Notable students: Kevin Ibeh, Charles Huang

Stephen Young (1944-2021) was a Scottish scholar in the field of international business. In his last academic role, he served as Research Professor of International Business at the Adam Smith Business School, University of Glasgow, UK.

== Biography ==
Stephen Young was born on 20 August 1944. He earned his Bachelor of Commerce from the University of Liverpool in 1966 and his Master of Science from Newcastle University in 1969.

Young has held academic posts at Louisiana State University, University of Texas at Dallas, Georgetown University, University of Strathclyde, and University of Glasgow. He was one of the founding fathers of the Academy of International Business UK and Ireland Chapter and the Chair of the AIB UK Chapter from 1991 to 1996.

Young died on 16 August 2021.

== Awards and honors ==
Young was awarded the first John Dunning Prize for Lifetime Achievement in 2015.

In September 2021, the University of Strathclyde founded the Stephen Young Institute for International Business within the Strathclyde Business School, made possible by one of his former PhD students.

== Selected books ==
- Young, Stephen; Lowe, A. V. (1974). Intervention in the Mixed Economy. Croom Helm. ISBN 978-0-856-64209-8.
- Hood, Neil; Young, Stephen (1979). The Economics of Multinational Enterprise. London: Longman. ISBN 978-0-582-44388-4.
- Young, Stephen; Hood, Neil; Hamill, James (1988). Foreign Multinationals and the British Economy: Impact and Policy. Croom Helm. ISBN 0-7099-1285-4.
- Young, Stephen; Hamill, James (1992). Europe and the Multinationals: Issues and Responses for the 1990s.
- Brewer, Thomas L.; Young, Stephen (1998). The Multilateral Investment System and Multinational Enterprises. Oxford: Oxford University Press. ISBN 978-0-19-829315-6.
- Hood, Neil; Peat, J.; Peters, E.; Young, Scott, eds. (2002). Scotland in a global economy: the 2020 vision. Houndmills, Basingstoke, Hampshire; New York: Palgrave Macmillan. ISBN 978-0-333-96454-5.
