= Chris Okewulonu =

Nigerian politician (born 1960)

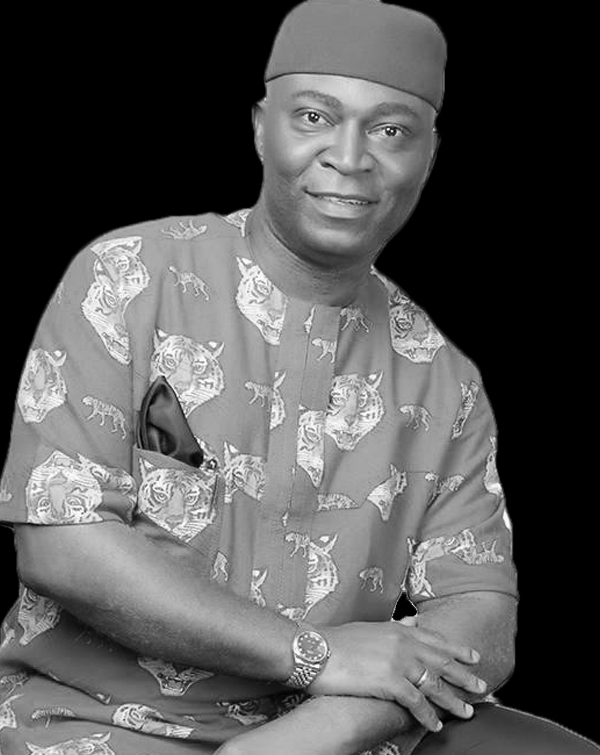

Chief of Staff to the Imo State Government
- In office 3 June 2019 – 15 January 2020
- Succeeded by: Nnamdi Anyaehie

Personal details
- Born: 24 December 1960 (age 65)
- Party: People's Democratic Party
- Education: Imo State University (LLB); Nigerian Law School (BL)
- Alma mater: Imo State University
- Profession: Lawyer, Politician, Entrepreneur

Chris Okewulonu // (born 24 December 1960) is a Nigerian barrister, politician and entrepreneur. He served as the Chief of Staff to Emeka Ihedioha as the Governor of Imo State from 3 June 2019 to 15 January 2020 He is a member of the People's Democratic Party.

== Early life and career ==
Okewulonu was born in Amaeke, Avutu, Obowo in 1960. He was called to the bar in 1986 and started his legal practice with the law firm of the first Civilian Governor of Old Imo State, Chief Sam Mbakwe. He has since held positions in the Nigerian Government such as elected member into the Imo State House of Assembly. He also worked as the Secretary-General, Avutu Development Union from 1988 - 1999.

In 1999, he became the executive assistant to the governor of Imo State and in 2001, he became the commissioner for Works, Housing and Transport in Imo State. In 2004, he became the Chairman/Coordinator of Heartland Football Club and in 2006, he was appointed as SSG to the imo state governor. In 2008, he was appointed a Federal Commissioner by President Goodluck Johnathan, representing South East Fiscal Responsibility Commission.

In 2011 Okewulonu was appointed as the Director-General of Ikedi Ohakim Governorship Election and in 2015, he was also appointed as the Director-General of Chukwuemeka Ihedioha’s Governorship Campaign.

On 1 June 2019, after the swearing-in of His Excellency Hon. Chukwuemeka Ihedioha as the Executive Governor of Imo State, Okewulonu was one of the first appointees to be sworn in alongside Chima Nwana to serve as Chief of Staff and Deputy Chief of Staff respectively.
