= Amaba =

Community in Isuikwuato Abia State, Nigeria

- Community
- Interactive map of Amaba
- Coordinates: 5°43′48.08″N 7°30′47.56″E
- Country: Nigeria
- State: Abia
- Local government area: Isuikwuato
- Time zone: UTC+1 (WAT)

Amaba (Mkpoputa) is a community under Isuikwuato, a local government area in Abia State in southeastern Nigeria.

Important landmarks in Amaba include the Nigerian Railway Station and Abosso Apostolic Faith Church of Jesus Christ. Century Hotels is also located at Amaba. Amaba shares boundaries with Ovim, Ezere, Umuasua, and Otampa.

Some prominent people and leaders in Amaba include Late Eze Josiah Madubuike, Late Bishop PDE Ejiofo, Late Eze Gospel Ugwa, Dr Ezeagwula Madukwe, Late Charles Okemiri, Late Sir Reuben Egbulonu, Mrs Rachel (Mamaocha) Okemiri. Dr Brian O Reuben, among others.

Situated about a mile south of the Isuikwuato Local Government Headquarters, Mbalano, Amaba comprises four kindreds, namely, Abiri, Umuokwarauge, Amainyim, and Amaokwo. Members of these kindreds are interspersed in three geographical communities called Ohoro, Ndiohia, and Amaokwo.
