= Kenneth Ikechukwu Ozoemena =

Nigerian physical chemist

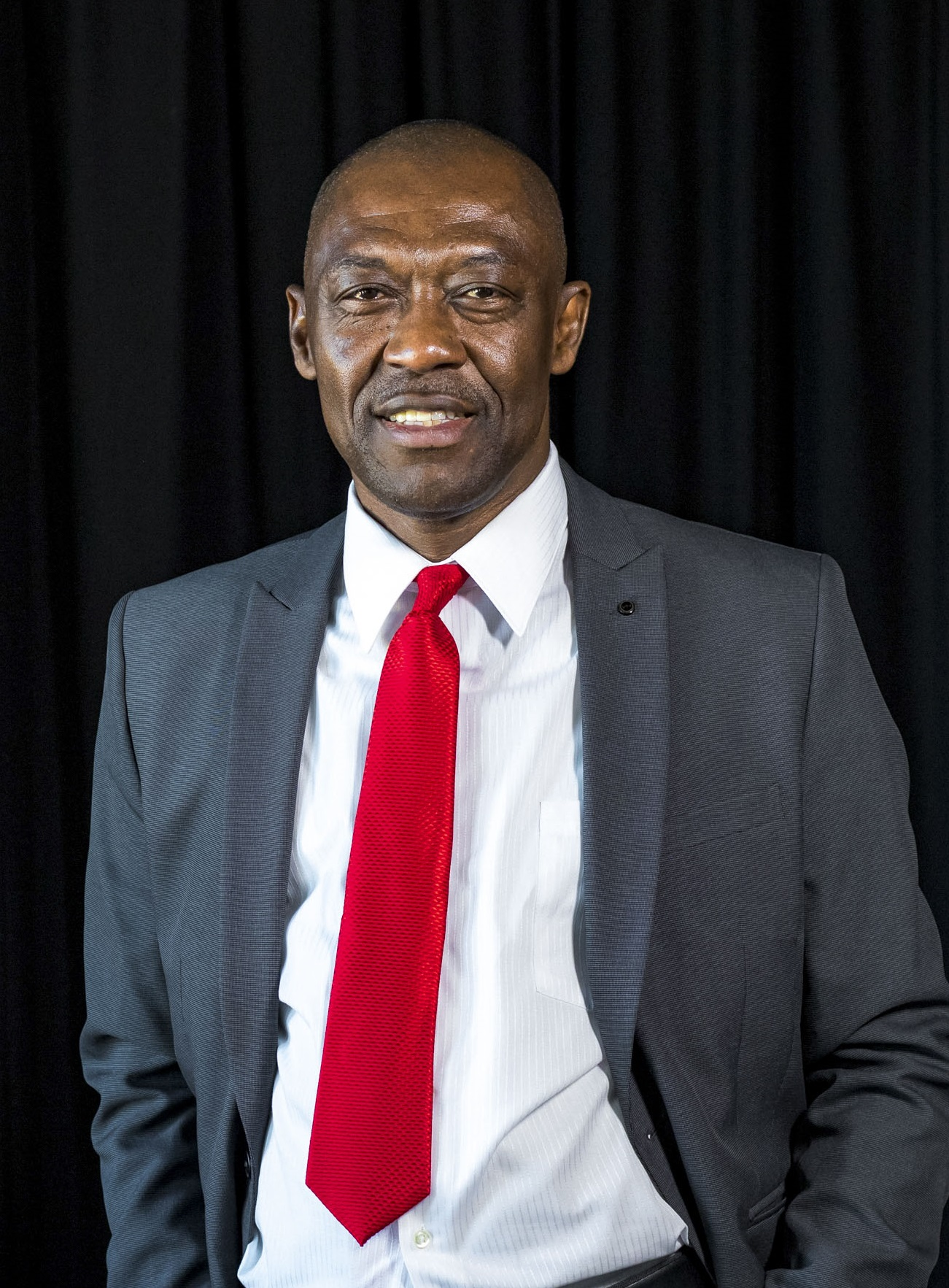
- Occupations: Physical chemist, materials scientist, and academic

Academic background
- Education: BSc (Hons) in Industrial Chemistry; MSc in Chemistry; MSc in Pharm Chemistry; Ph.D. in Chemistry
- Alma mater: Abia State University; University of Lagos; Rhodes University; University of Pretoria
- Thesis: Metallophthalocyanines as photocatalysts for transformation of chlorophenols and self-assembled monolayers for electrochemical detection of thiols and cyanides (2003)

Kenneth Ikechukwu Ozoemena is a Nigerian physical chemist, materials scientist, and academic. He is a research professor at the University of the Witwatersrand (Wits) in Johannesburg where he Heads the South African SARChI Chair in Materials Electrochemistry and Energy Technologies (MEET), supported by the Department of Science and Innovation (DSI), National Research Foundation (NRF) and Wits.

Ozoemena group conducts interdisciplinary research across physics, chemistry, biomedical, chemical, and metallurgical engineering. He has authored numerous peer-reviewed articles, 11 book chapters, and edited books, including Nanomaterials for Fuel Cell Catalysis, and Nanomaterials in Advanced Batteries and Supercapacitors.

Ozoemena became a Fellow of the Royal Society of Chemistry (FRSC) in 2011, Fellow of the African Academy of Sciences (FAAS) in 2015, and a member of the Academy of Science of South Africa (ASSAf) in 2016. He serves as an associate editor for Electrocatalysis and co-Editor-in-Chief of Electrochemistry Communications.

== Early life and education ==
He is an indigene of Obinikpa Umuokpara, Okohia in Umuna, Onuimo local government area of Imo State, Nigeria. Ozoemena earned his baccalaureate degree in industrial chemistry from the University of Abia in 1992 and went on to receive master's degrees in chemistry and pharmaceutical chemistry in 1997 and 1998, respectively, from the University of Lagos. In 2003, he completed his Ph.D. at Rhodes University in South Africa and served as a research fellow at the University of Pretoria.

== Career ==
Following his Ph.D., Ozoemena began his academic career as an Andrew W. Mellon Lecturer of Chemistry at Rhodes University in 2004 and held an appointment at the University of Pretoria as a senior lecturer of chemistry in 2006, and later as extraordinary professor of chemistry from 2009 to 2017. He was also appointed as an extraordinary professor of chemistry at the University of the Western Cape from 2011 to 2014, and an honorary professor of chemistry at the University of the Witwatersrand from 2014 to 2017. Subsequently, in 2017, after about an 8-year stint at the Council for Scientific and Industrial Research (CSIR), he was appointed as professor, and later promoted to research professor at the School of Chemistry of the University of the Witwatersrand. He serves as an Honorary Visiting professor at the Wuhan University of Technology, China.

Ozoemena was elected African representative of the International Society of Electrochemistry from 2010 to 2015 and chair of the Scientific Meeting Committee (SMC) of the International Society of Electrochemistry. He was the chair of the Organising Committee of the 70th Annual Meeting of the International Society of Electrochemistry (ISE) Durban, the first conference of the ISE on the African continent. Subsequently, he served as the lead guest editor of the special issue of the conference in Electrochimica Acta.

== Research ==
Ozoemena has focused his research in the field of materials electrochemistry, with a specific interest in advanced batteries, fuel cells, and electrochemical sensors as the primary aspects of investigation.

=== Lithium-ion batteries ===
Ozoemena has worked on improving the structural and electrochemical properties of lithium-ion batteries. One of his innovations include the use of microwave-assisted synthesis to mitigate the problems of manganese dissolution and the so-called Jahn-Teller distortion which conspire against the development and commercialization of high-energy and low-cost manganese-based cathode materials.

=== Aqueous mobile ion batteries and supercapacitors ===
Ozoemena's enquiry on the microwave-assisted synthesis and use of low cost and environmentally friendly manganese-based raw materials has led to the discovery of a new strategy of making triplite manganese fluorophosphate. In addition, Ozoemena group has demonstrated that nanostructured manganese-based complexes are promising materials for the development of high-performance supercapacitors and pseudocapacitors.

=== Fuel cells and electrolyzers ===
Ozoemena worked on the use of microwave-assisted synthesis to bring about 'top-down' nanosizing of palladium catalysts, introducing the term "MITNAD" which is an acronym for "microwave-induced top-down nanostructuring and decoration". He has continued to explore the application of this technique and related techniques for the development of high-performance electrocatalysts for fuel cells and electrolyzers.

=== Zinc-ion and rechargeable zinc-air batteries ===
Ozoemena and collaborators have studied several electrode materials that can enhance the efficacy of zinc-ion and rechargeable zinc-air batteries (RZAB). The key research focus in this field has been to develop real and relevant RZAB technology for stationary and mobile applications.

=== Electrochemical sensors ===
Ozoemena has contributed in connecting biomedicine with electrochemistry, resulting in the creation of electrochemical bio- and immuno-sensors capable of detecting diseases that are mostly found in resource-limited countries, including tuberculosis in HIV-positive patients, vibrio cholera toxins in water bodies, substance abuse such as tramadol, and human papillomavirus (HPV) biomarkers for cervical cancer.

== Awards and honors ==
- 2003-2013 – World's top 1% of Scientists within Chemistry, Thomson Reuters' ISI Essential Science Indicators
- 2008 – Chartered Chemist (CChem), Royal Society of Chemistry
- 2011 – Elected Fellow, Royal Society of Chemistry
- 2014 – The CEO's Award, Council for Scientific & Industrial Research (CSIR)
- 2014 – Listed as #2 amongst the "Twenty most productive South African authors of energy papers (2000–2011)", Academy of Science of South Africa (ASSAf).
- 2015 – Elected Fellow, African Academy of Sciences
- 2016 – Elected member, Academy of Science of South Africa (ASSAf)
- 2016 – Innovation Award, Council for Scientific & Industrial Research (CSIR)
- 2019 – World Top 2% Scientists, Stanford University, PLoS Biology
- 2020 – World Top 2% Scientists, PLoS Biology
- 2021 – SARChI Chair (Tier 1), DSI-NRF-Wits
- 2023 – 'A'-rated Scientist, National Research Foundation (NRF)
- 2023 - Vice President (Southern Africa) and member of the governing council of the African Academy of Sciences

== Bibliography ==
=== Edited books ===
- Recent Advances in Analytical Electrochemistry (2007) ISBN 978-8178952741
- Nanomaterials in Advanced Batteries and Supercapacitors (2016) ISBN 978-3319260808
- Nanomaterials for Fuel Cell Catalysis (2016) ISBN 978-3319262499

=== Selected articles ===
- Mathebula, N.S., Pillay, J., Toschi, G., Verschoor, J.A. & Ozoemena, K.I. (2009). Recognition of anti-mycolic acid antigens on gold electrode: A potential impedimetric immunosensing platform for active tuberculosis. Chemical Communications, 3345–3347 ("HOT ARTICLE"). doi.org/10.1039/B905192A
- Jafta, C.J., Mathe, M.K., Manyala, N., Roos, W.D. & Ozoemena, K.I. (2013). Microwave-Assisted Synthesis of High-Voltage Nanostructured LiMn1.5Ni0.5O4 spinel: Tuning the Mn3+ Content and Electrochemical Performance, ACS Applied Materials & Interfaces, 5, 7592–7598. doi.org/10.1021/am401894t
- Fashedemi, O.O., Miller, H.A., Marchionni, A., Vizza, F. & Ozoemena, K.I. (2015). Electro-oxidation of ethylene glycol and glycerol at palladium-decorated FeCo@Fe core–shell nanocatalysts for alkaline direct alcohol fuel cells: functionalized MWCNT supports and impact on product selectivity. Journal of Materials Chemistry A, 3, 7145–7156. doi.org/10.1039/C5TA00076A
- Ozoemena, K. I. (2016). Nanostructured platinum-free electrocatalysts in alkaline direct alcohol fuel cells: catalyst design, principles and applications. RSC Aadvances, 6(92), 89523-89550 doi.org/10.1039/C6RA15057H
- Raju, K., Han, H., Velusamy, D.B., Jiang, Q., Yang, H., Nkosi, F.P., Palaniyandy, N., Makgopa, K., Bo, Z. & Ozoemena, K.I. (2020). Rational Design of 2D Manganese Phosphate Hydrate Nanosheets as Pseudocapacitive Electrodes. ACS Energy Letters 5, 23–30; doi.org/10.1021/acsenergylett.9b02299
- Peteni, S., Ozoemena, O.C., Khawula, T., Haruna, A.B., Rawson, F.J., Shai, L.J., Ola, O. & Ozoemena, K.I. (2023). Electrochemical Immunosensor for Ultra-Low Detection of Human Papillomavirus Biomarker for Cervical Cancer. ACS Sensors, 8 (7), 2761–2770; doi.org/10.1021/acssensors.3c00677
