= Joy Onumajuru =

Nigerian ex beauty pageant winner and entrepreneur

- Education: Imo State University; University of Greenwich
- Occupation: Entrepreneur

Joy Osomiamhe-Onumajuru (born 19 February 1991) is a Nigerian ex beauty pageant winner and entrepreneur. She is the founder of African Scholars Care Initiative and Diamond Scholars Royal Academy.

== Early life and education ==
Onumajuru started her education at Nursery and Primary School Festac Town, Lagos State from 1992 to 1995 and 5th Avenue Primary School, Festac Town, Lagos State from 1995 to 2000, she continued at Rolex Comprehensive College, Iba Town, Ojo LGA, Lagos State from 2000 to 2003 and Barek Memorial High School, Iba Town, Ojo LGA, Lagos State from 2003 to 2006 for her secondary education. From 2008 to 2012, she went to Imo State University and graduated with a degree in computer science. From 2014 to 2016, she furthered to University of Greenwich where she obtained an MSC in management business information technology.

== Career ==
Onumajuru started her career in 2011 by winning Queen of Aso Nigeria. In 2014, she relocated to the UK where she won another pageant, Miss Commonwealth Africa. She returned to Nigeria and worked with Shakatawa and Africa Independent Television on Personalities Places & Event All. Later in her career, she started African Scholars Care Initiative (ASCI) providing educational support and relief materials for the less privileged across the six geo-political zones in Nigeria. In 2020, ASCI placed 100 Nigerian girls on ICT training.

== Awards and recognition ==
In 2014, Onumajuru received a Nigeria Goodwill Ambassador Award and African Leading Women Award in 2019.
