= Isuikwuato =

- town and local government area
- Interactive map of Isuikwuato
- Coordinates: 5°44′06″N 7°30′09″E
- Country: Nigeria
- State: Abia State

Population (2006)
  - Total: 115,794
- Time zone: UTC+1 (WAT)

Isuikwuato// is a town and local government area in Abia State in southeastern Nigeria. This local government area falls under the Abia North senatorial district in Abia State, Nigeria. The name Isu-Ikwu-Ato translates from Igbo as 'three Isu families or lineage' and refers to the three lineages descended from the Isu people, in what is now a local government area. The three brothers are Imenyi who is the eldest, Oguduasaa, his younger brother from the same mother and Isuamawo the second oldest and first from the second wife. These three major clans which also harbour various communities in each of them make up the present day Isuikwuato. It has an estimated population of over 50,000 people. Isuikwuato has natural resources such as iron ore and kaolin. Oil lines flow through Isuikwuato and there have been cases of burst pipe which have had severe effects on the local economy and environment. The major cash crops are palm oil and cassava. The soil at Isuikwuato is loose and suffers from erosion and this left some dangerous erosion sites in the area. They lack the needed government backing to build drainages around the area to guide the flow of water without further harming the already crying soil. Blessed with hills and highlands, the town will appreciate water infrastructures because water is an important but hard resource to get in Isuikwuato. Isuikwuato is also home to Abia State University Uturu.

Isuikwuato people are predominantly Christians. Catholic, Anglicans, Presbyterians and Methodists dominate other denominations, but denominations such as Assemblies of God have increased in number.

== Geography ==
The average temperature of Isiukwuato Local Government Area is 28 degrees Celsius or 82.4 degrees Fahrenheit, and it experiences two distinct seasons. In the Local Government Area, there is an average humidity of 64% and an average wind speed of 10 km/h or 6 mph.

== Localities ==
Isuikwuato has eight communities/districts, these communities contains several villages including;

- Amaba
- Eluama: Umuebere Nkuma (Obu-Na-Ebere Nkuma), Umuebere Aja, Umuama, Ekebe, Obodo, Umusoo, Umuokogbuo, Umuerem, Ndi Ogu, Umuezeoka, Umuihe (formerly, Umu Ohu) and Igidi-Inyim
- Umuasua
- Ozara
- Otampa

Amaibo Oguduasa

- Umunnekwu-Agbo: Eziama, Umuankwa, Umuihu (Agbama, Umueze, Umuekari, Umuodum), Umura.
- Ezere: Isiala-Ezere, Ozara, Umuakwua
- Mgbelu Umunnekwu: Amawo, Umuezebete, Ohukabia, Ugwuntu,
- Acha: Agbama, Umuokombo, Etiti-Orji, Amangwu, Amachara, Ama-Ahia, Amaisisi, Ndiokoroukwu
- Ovim: Amune, Obayi, Amake, Ohoroho, Ohonja.
- Isiala-Ezere Autonomous Community that made up of 8 villages. Umuagu,Amaohoro, Amaelem, Amaja,Umuakam, Mgbelu Amaja, Amaozo,Ndi Ogbugo
- Uturu: Isunabo, Achara, Nvurunvu.
- Umuobiala: Amaise (Umuana, Amutu, and ...), Obinohia (Alimenze), Ndiohia, and Umuemoke (Amaji, Amaedele, Aliokoroafo).

== Notable people ==
- Ndubuisi Ekekwe, American Professor of Robotics
- Rear Admiral Ndubuisi Kanu, former military governor of Imo State and Lagos State
- Major General Ike Nwachukwu, former military governor of Imo State, Former Senator of Abia State, Former Nigerian Minister for foreign Affairs
- Azubuike Ihejirika, Commander of the Federal Republic, CFR (Born 13 February 1956) from Eluobai Ovim was a Nigerian Soldier and former Nigerian Army Chief of Army Staff, COAS
- Navy Captain Christopher Osondu, former appointed military administrator of Cross River State
- Professor Ernest Ojukwu SAN, Nigerian Lawyer
- Kelechi Emeteole, aka Caterpillar, Nigerian Footballer and coach.
- Sunday Mba, Nigerian professional footballer.
- Basketmouth, entertainer and stand up comedian.
- Oluchi Onweagba, international model and first winner of M-Net Face of Africa.
- Linda Ejiofor, renowned Nollywood actress
- Raymond Nkemdirim, Security Expert/Former Director of Operations, DSS
- Ezo Ukandu (15 June 1936 - 8 January 2024) Enyi-na-Obiangwu of the Imenyi Ancient Kingdom.

== See also ==
- List of villages in Abia State
