= Chiedozie Akwiwu =

Nigerian businessman and philanthropist

- Born: 11 February 1988 (age 38); Warri, Delta State, Nigeria)
- Occupations: Businessman; philanthropist

Chiedozie Akwiwu (born 11 February 1988) is a Nigerian businessman and philanthropist. He is a co-founder of the online energy bill payment platform Paynergy.

== Early life and education ==
Akwiwu grew up in Warri, Delta State. He attended DSC Primary and Secondary School, Warri and obtained his first leaving school certificate in 2005, before preceding to Imo State University where he graduated in 2009 with a degree in accountancy. He did his one-year mandatory National Youth Service Corps in Lagos State.

== Career ==
Akwiwu began his career in Agribusiness, founding Doak Integrated Resources Limited as a construction, real estate, and agricultural commodities company. Later in his career, he founded Nigeria Made Hub and Puragon Oil and Gas Distribution. In 2018, he alongside Akinyele Tobi co-founded an online energy bill payment platform Paynergy.

== Philanthropy ==
In December 2019, Akwiwu started a malaria eradication project, providing for 150 children in Kuchigoro community, Abuja.

== Awards and recognition ==
Akwiwu received The Most Enterprising Personality Of The Year at the 2020 Nigeria Entrepreneur Awards.

== Personal life ==
Akwiwu was born in Warri, Delta State, Nigeria. He is a native of Ogwuaga Abba community, Nwangele, Imo State, Nigeria.
