= Ebuka Songs =

Nigerian gospel singer (born 2000)

- Born: Ebuka Emmanuel Hillary; 10 May 2000 (age 26); Imo State, Nigeria
- Genres: Contemporary worship; contemporary gospel
- Occupations: Singer; songwriter; worship leader
- Instruments: Vocals; piano; guitar
- Years active: 2021-present
- Label: Spotlite Nation

Ebuka Emmanuel Hillary (born 10 May 2000) known professionally as Ebuka Songs is a Nigerian gospel artiste and songwriter. He came to recognition with the hit single “I will pray”. He was signed under the record label Spotlite Nation by Moses Bliss in 2023.

== Early life and education ==
Ebuka Songs was born in 2000 in Obinze in Imo State, Nigeria, where he also spent most of his childhood. He is an indigene of Owerri, Imo State, and was born into the family of Mr. and Mrs. Hillary as fourth child of six children.

He acquired his primary and secondary education in Imo State. In 2019, he graduated from Imo State University, with a Bachelor’s Degree in Theatre Arts.

== Career ==
Ebuka Songs was born and raised in a devout Christian home, which influenced his musical career. He discovered his passion for music at a young age. However, his musical journey started while he was an undergraduate student at Imo State University, where he served as a worship leader.

In 2021, he released his first official album titled Midnight Cry. In March 2023, he released the hit single "I Will Pray" which earned him recognition. That same year, he was signed by Moses Bliss' record label, Spotelite Nation.

== Discography ==
=== Singles ===
- I will pray
- Calling my name
- The name of Jesus
- Jesus Christ is seen
- Jesus Oh with Moses Bliss
- What I Preach
- Total Submission
- New Generation
- Fade Away (2024)
- My True Experience - Live (2026)

Album

- Soaked Worship Experience (2023)
- Outpouring (2023)

== Awards and recognition ==
In December 2023, Ebuka Songs was mentioned among YNaija’s "150 Most Interesting People in Culture" by Chude Jideonwo.

Year	Award	Category	Result	Ref
2023	CLIMA Africa Awards	Africa Best Male Gospel Award	Won	
2023		Africa Rising Star	Won	
2023	Galaxy Music Awards	Breakthrough Artist Of The Year	Won	
