= Ernest Ojukwu =

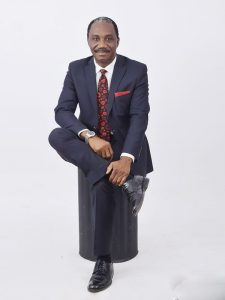
Ernest Ojukwu

Ernest Maduabuchi Ojukwu (born September 23, 1960), Senior Advocate of Nigeria and Professor of Law is a past Deputy Director-General and Head Augustine Nnamani Campus Enugu, Nigerian Law School. Before his appointment, he was Associate Professor and Dean Faculty of Law, Abia State University, Uturu from 1995-2001. He is also the President of the Network of University Legal Aid Institutions (NULAI Nigeria), the platform through which he has continued to achieve his dreams of promoting clinical legal education and reform of legal education in Nigeria.

== Background ==
Ernest Ojukwu hails from Amaezigba Ahaba Imenyi, Isuikwuato Local Government of Abia State in South East Nigeria. He attended the Methodist College Uzuakoli and Government College Umuahia. Ojukwu is a graduate of Obafemi Awolowo University Ile-Ife where he received the Bachelor of Laws and Master of Laws Degrees in 1983 and 1987 respectively. He also obtained a certificate on Alternative Dispute Resolution from the University of California Sacramento Center for African Peace and Conflict Resolution.

== Career ==
Ernest Ojukwu began his career in 1985 when he simultaneously joined the services of Abia State University as an Assistant Lecturer and began to practice Law in the chambers of Chief G. N. Atulomah. In 1998, he left to establish with his friends, a Law firm named Eleuthera Chambers. He rose to the position of Dean of the Faculty of Law in Abia State University where he served from 1995-2001. He was also a very active member of the Nigerian Bar Association, serving as Secretary of the Aba Branch of the Association from 1992–1993 and Chairman between 1997 and 1999.

Ernest Ojukwu has published extensively. He is co-author of Introduction to Civil Procedure, a quality and leading material on Civil Litigation for Law School Students in Nigeria as well Legal Practitioners, Editor of Nigerian Law and Practice Journal, & Editor-In-Chief Nigerian Bar Journal. He is also a leading vanguard in pioneering the development of clinical legal education in Nigeria and is the President of the Network of University Legal Aid Institutions (NULAI Nigeria) which serves to promote clinical legal education and reform of legal education in Nigeria. He is the National Representative of Nigeria in the Brown-Morsten International Client Consultation Competition.

Ojukwu’s interest as a scholar includes the subjects of Continuing Legal Education, Civil Litigation and Access to Justice. He has also continued to play a very active role in the professional activities of the Nigerian Bar Association where he once served as the Chairman, Aba Branch of the Association and presently chairs the Academic Forum and Legal Education Committee.

== Publications ==
Ernest Ojukwu has published extensively. He is co-author of Introduction to Civil Procedure, a quality and leading material on Civil Litigation for Law School Students in Nigeria as well Legal Practitioners. He was editor of Nigerian Law and Practice Journal, & Editor-In-Chief Nigerian Bar Journal. Some of his publications include:

=== Book Chapters ===
1. OJUKWU ERNEST 2025: “Nigeria- History of Legal Education”, Elgar Concise Encyclopedia of Legal Education, Chapter 73, 2025

2. MARYAM ABDULKADIR & ERNEST OJUKWU 2025: “Clinical legal education in Africa: Clinical Legal education in Nigeria: The Journey So Far”, Giddings, J, ed., Global Clinical Legal Education, Chapter 6, p. 94 Routledge (Taylor & Francis), 2025

3) OJUKWU ERNEST & UGOCHUKWU NJOKU 2021: “Legal and Commercial Challenges facing Electricity Distribution Companies in Nigeria”, Cyprian O. Ajah & Chukunweike A Ogbuabor, ed An Amazon in the Pinnacle of Justice (Essays in Honour of Hon Justice NP Emehelu, Enugu, pp. 718-741

4) OJUKWU ERNEST 2019: “Judging the Judges: Issues, Trends and Perspectives in Nigeria”, D. Okeowo, ed, Trailblazer: A Selection of Essays and Papers in Celebration of Chief Folanke Solanke, SAN, CON, Chapter 7, Nigeria Legal Magnates, pp. 93-118,

5). OJUKWU ERNEST & UGOCHUKWU NJOKU 2018: “Money Laundering and Interim Forfeiture of Assets, A. Adewopo, ed, New Developments in Law and Practice in Nigeria- Essays in Honour of Dele Adesina SAN, Chapter 15, Nigeria Biographers Nig Ltd, pp. 257-319

6). OJUKWU ERNEST 2018: “Making a real change; legal Education in Nigeria- partly re-Imagined”, Grimes, R, ed, Rethinking Legal Education Under the Civil and Common Law: A Road Map for Constructive Change, Routledge, pages 192-201.

7) OJUKWU ERNEST 2011: David McQuoid-Mason, Ernest Ojukwu, and George Mukundi Wachira,, “Clinical Legal Education in Africa: Legal Education and Community Service”, in Bloch Frank (ed), The Global Clinical Movement: Educating Lawyers for Social Justice, Chapter 2, New York, Oxford University Press, 2011.

8) OJUKWU ERNEST, 2010: “The 2007 Proposals of the National Committee on the Reform of Legal Education Nigeria: Challenges and Way Forward” Current Legal Issues in Nigerian Jurisprudence, Essays in Honour of Chief Adegboyega Solomon Awomolo, SAN, Chapter 4, pp.101-124.

9) OJUKWU ERNEST 2006: “Civil Procedure” in Uwais Through the Cases, Hon. Justice Niki Tobi (ed), Chapter 16 Pp. 555 – 580.

10) OJUKWU ERNEST 2006: “Crisis in Legal Education in Nigeria: Need for Reform or Attitudinal Change?” A Living Judicial Legend: Essays in Honour of Hon. Justice A.G. Karibi-Whyte (CON), Chapter 15, Pp. 249-270.

11) OJUKWU ERNEST 2005: Challenges to Legal Education in the Commonwealth: The Nigerian Experience, Growing the Law Nurturing Justice: Essays in Honour of Niki Tobi, JSC, Chapter 10, Pp. 348- 366.

12) OJUKWU ERNEST 2003: “Trends in Legal Education: A Comparative Analysis of Nigeria, USA, UK, and South Africa, Nigerian Law School: Four Decades of Service to the Legal Profession, Chapter Xi, Pp. 133 – 141.

13) OJUKWU ERNEST 2002: “Land Suits Must not be in the Situs”, Nweze C.C. ed. Justice in the Judicial Process, Fourth Dimension Publishers, 2002, Chapter 12 Pp. 378 -389.

14) OJUKWU ERNEST 2001: “Federal High Court Jurisdiction and the 1999 Constitution”, Awa Kalu Ed. Hon. Justice K.O. Anyah- A Titan at Eighty: (Essays), Chapter 7 Pp. 194 - 207

15) OJUKWU ERNEST 1999: “The Effect of Decree No. 62 1999 On Existing Laws”, Traversing the Path of Justice (Essays in Honour of Justice C.I. Uche) Chapter 8 Pp. 129-143

=== Books ===
1. OJUKWU ERNEST, et al, Street Law: Freedom of Information, 2016

2. OJUKWU ERNEST, et al, Freedom of Information Handbook for Law Clinics, 2015

3. OJUKWU ERNEST et al: Clinical Legal Education: Curriculum, lessons and Materials, Abuja NULAI Nigeria, 2013.

4. OJUKWU ERNEST: Legal Education in Nigeria: A Chronicle of Reforms and Transformation under Tahir Mamman, Council of Legal Education, 2013;

5. OJUKWU ERNEST et al: Handbook on Prison Pre-trial Detainee Law Clinic, Abuja, NULAI Nigeria, 2012

6. OJUKWU ERNEST & LAGI, O: Manual on Prison Pre-trial Detainee Law Clinic, Abuja, NULAI Nigeria, 2012

7. OJUKWU ERNEST & OJUKWU CHUDI: Introduction to Civil Procedure, Helen-Roberts, 3rd Edition 2009.

8. OJUKWU ERNEST & OJUKWU CHUDI: Introduction to Civil Procedure, Helen-Roberts, 2nd Edition 2005.

9. OJUKWU ERNEST & OJUKWU CHUDI: Introduction to Civil Procedure, Helen-Roberts, 2002

13. OJUKWU ERNEST: Legal Practitioners’ Charges in Nigeria: Law and Practice, Helen-Roberts Research and Resources Ltd, Lagos 1997.

=== Monographs ===
1) OJUKWU ERNEST, et al, 2014: Street Law: Child Rights Manual.

2) OJUKWU ERNEST, 2014: Mandatory Continuing Legal Education Programme for Lawyers in Nigeria

3) OJUKWU ERNEST, et al, 2013: Impact Assessment of Clinical Legal Education in Nigeria

4) OJUKWU ERNEST, 1997: Is Fawehinmi V Abacha A Correct Decision?, Legal Practice Notes (Human Rights Law No.1)

5) OJUKWU ERNEST, 1997: Companies Proceedings Rules 1992 Annotated (Legal Practice Notes No.2)
