= European Journal of Marketing =

Academic peer-reviewed journal in the field of marketing

- Discipline: Marketing
- Language: English
- Edited by: Greg W. Marshall

Publication details
- History: 1967–present
- Publisher: Emerald Group Publishing
- Frequency: 13/year
- Open access: Hybrid
- Impact factor: 3.7 (2023)

Standard abbreviations
- ISO 4: Eur. J. Mark.

Indexing
- ISSN: 0309-0566
- LCCN: 83640837
- OCLC no.: 48646128

Links
- Journal homepage; Online archive

The European Journal of Marketing is a peer-reviewed academic journal covering the field of marketing. It is published by Emerald Group Publishing and the editor-in-chief is Greg W. Marshall (Rollins College). The journal was established in 1967. Since 2021, the journal publishes 13 issues per year, one of them an open access issue.

== Abstracting and indexing ==
The journal is abstracted and indexed in Scopus and the Social Sciences Citation Index. According to the Journal Citation Reports, its 2023 impact factor is 3.7.

== Notable articles ==
According to a 2017 bibliometric analysis, the most cited paper was published by Christian Grönroos in 1984 on the field of service quality. As of 2024, it has been cited nearly 15,000 times according to Google Scholar.
