= African Studies (journal) =

Peer-reviewed scholarly journal

- Discipline: African studies
- Language: English

Publication details
- Publisher: Routledge (United Kingdom)
- Frequency: Triannual
- Impact factor: 0.345 (2014)

Standard abbreviations
- ISO 4: Afr. Stud.

Indexing
- ISSN: 0002-0184 (print); 1469-2872 (web)

African Studies is a peer-reviewed scholarly journal publishing articles in the fields of anthropology, linguistics, history, sociology, politics, geography, and literary and cultural studies. It was founded in 1921 under the title Bantu Studies.

== Abstracting and indexing ==
The journal is indexed in Sociological Abstracts, International Political Science Abstracts, Applied Social Science Index, International Bibliography of the Social Sciences, Current Bibliography on African Affairs, and Abstracts in Anthropology.
