= Abia State University =

Public university in Uturu, Nigeria

Coordinates: 5.8281748°N 7.3960036°E

Abia State University Uturu
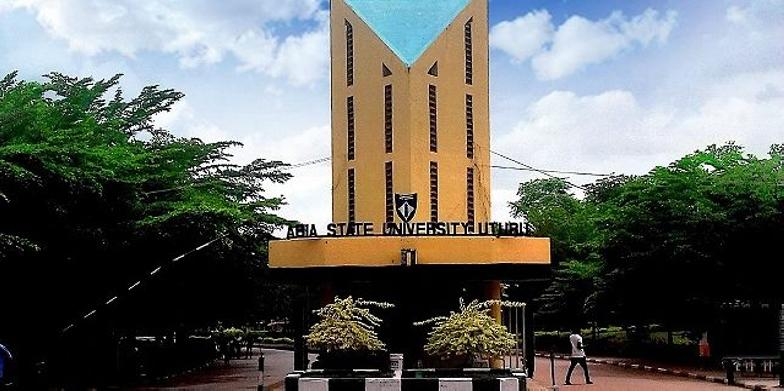
- Motto: Excellence and Service
- Type: Public
- Established: 1981
- Chancellor: Tor Tiv: His Royal Majesty: James Ayatse
- Vice-Chancellor: Professor Amadike Ugbogu
- Students: 21,000
- Undergraduates: 18951
- Postgraduates: 1139
- Doctoral students: 310
- Location: Uturu, Abia, Nigeria
- Campus: Rural/suburban
- Website: Official website

Abia State University Uturu (ABSU) is a Nigerian public university. It is owned by the Abia State government.

State government-owned academic institutions were created to expand admissions and bring professional skills, expertise and modern research facilities close to the city and rural dwellers, and have helped talented students to obtain higher education.

The inception of the university was in 1981 in the former Imo State under the name of Imo State University, Etiti. The university was established by Sam Mbakwe when he was governor of old Imo State. The main campus was located at Etiti, Imo State, while the Law Department was located in a separate Campus at Aba. Between 1984 and 1985 under the military governorship of General Ike Nwachukwu, the university moved to its permanent site at Uturu Okigwe.

Following the creation of Abia State in 1991, the Uturu campus of the university was ceded to Abia State, and is now known as Abia State University Uturu, Isuikwuato Local Government Area, Abia State, Nigeria. The university is organized in colleges and schools having been founded on the same collegiate system that the University of Nebraska system operates.

Studies at Abia State University include: undergraduate, graduate and doctorate degrees. It has two campuses- its main campus in Uturu; and the College of Law, College of Agriculture and Veterinary Medicine housed by the campus in Umuahia, capital of Abia State, Nigeria.

== Academics ==
Abia State University offers more than 90 undergraduate and graduate programs across ten colleges.

- College of Humanities and Social Sciences
- College of Agriculture and Veterinary Medicine
- College of Biological and Physical Sciences
- College of Business Administration
- College of Education
- College of Engineering and Environmental Studies
- College of Law
- College of Medicine and Health Sciences
- College of Optometry
- College of Postgraduate Studies

== Centres, directorates and institutes ==
The following are centres, directorates and Institutes within Abia State University;

- Centre For Entrepreneurial Education
- Student Affairs Department
- Counseling Centre
- Centre for Primary and Non-Formal Education
- General Studies
- Centre for Igbo Studies
- Academic Planning
- SIWES
- Sandwich Programme
- Centre for Remedial Studies
- University Examination Centre
- Business Resource Centre
- Institute for Distance Education (IDEA)
- Institute for Computer Studies
- Consultancies, Linkages & Revenue Mobilization
- Institute of Arts & Sciences
- Centre for Quality Assurance

== Library ==
Abia State University Library was established on 8 February alongside the university in 1981 but started its operation and services on 1 October 1981. The E-library was launched by the National Universities Commission on 3 July 2007 with the aim of enhancing teaching and research programmes of the students and lecturers and primarily serve the university community.

Branch Libraries

- Uturu Main Campus Library
- E-Library, Uturu Law Library
- Umuahia Campus Agricultural Library
- Umuahia Campus E-Library
- Umuahia Campus Medical Library
- Aba Campus

== Ranking ==
On 29 February 2024, Abia State University was ranked 37th among the state public universities in Nigeria.

== Notable alumni ==
- Ezinne Akudo, beauty queen and former Miss Nigeria
- Kevin Ibeh, Pro Vice-Chancellor at Birkbeck, University of London
- Allison Madueke, former military governor and former chief of the Nigerian Naval staff
- Kelechi Onuzuruike, Nigerian politician
- Kenneth Ozoemena, Nigerian physical chemist
- Elena Seifert, Kazakh-Russian poet, translator, literary critic, and journalist

== Past Vice Chancellors ==
- Ogwo E. Ogwo
- Mkpa A. Mkpa
- Chibuzor Ogbuagu
- Professor Eleazar Uche Ikonne
- O. M. Ogbulu 2024- 2025
- Professor Ndukwe Okuedo 2024- 2026

== See also ==
- Academic libraries in Nigeria
