= Uturu =

Town in Abia State, Nigeria

Uturu // is a town located within latitudes 05.33°N and 06.03°N, in the northern part of Abia State, Nigeria. It is in the transition from rural to urban status, so it is witnessing many development activities. It is popularly known as a location for several educational institutions, and the Marist Brothers community. Schools in Uturu include Abia State University, Marist Brothers' Juniorate, Uturu, Gregory University, and several post-secondary schools.

The population of Uturu has been growing at a high rate over decades, until the last decade. Its present population is over 40,000. It has archaeological importance — in 1977 a team of archaeologists discovered signs of the habitation of early, middle, and late Stone Age Homo erectus.

Uturu is divided into two regions, Ihite and Ikeagha. Ihite comprises Achara and Mba Ugwu (Ugwuele, Ugwu-Ogu, Umu-Anyi, Ugwu-Ele, Ngodo, Amegu, Obi-Agu, Nnembi and Aro). Ikeagha comprises Isunabo, Akpukpa, Umumara, Nvurunvu, and Ndundu. In Uturu is the archeological site of Ngodo, in which was found a huge collection of stone-age implements, suggesting that the site was a major factory for such tools. They have the same ancestral origins with Aku, a ward in Okigwe L.G.A.

== Notable people ==
- Uchechukwu Sampson Ogah, president/CEO, Master Energy Group
