= Omadino Community =

- Communities of Warri Kingdom
- Interactive map of Omadino Community
- Country: Nigeria
- State: Delta State
- LGA: Warri South
- Kingdom: Warri Kingdom

Government
  - Olu of Warri: Ogiame Atuwatse III
  - Local Government Chairman: Dr. Michael Tidi
- Time zone: UTC+1 (WAT)
- Postal code: 331104

Omadino Community is an indigenous Itsekiri urban community in Warri Kingdom. The people of Omadino are the descendants of Nenuwa, the legendary ancestor and founder of the Omadino community who migrated with his followers from Ode in the Ijebu kingdom following their unsuccessful bid for the throne of the Ijebu kingdom. Omadino Community is one of the oldest communities in the Warri Kingdom having existed before the formation of the Warri Kingdom in 1480. Omadino Community is one of the biggest communities in the Warri Kingdom as it falls under Warri South with extensions to Warri North and Warri South-West. It is located in Warri South Local Government Area of present-day Delta State, Nigeria.

It sits in the Obodo/Omadino ward of Warri South and Warri federal constituency.

== Geography ==
Omadino Community is bounded on the left bank of the Escravos River by Kantu and Okerenghigho. The Bight of Nana River marks its boundary with Ugborodo, while along Nana Creek, it adjoins Young Town. On the mainland, Omadino's territory meets that of the Okpe people.

== Families ==
There are three quarters in Omadino Community which represent three main families. These are Ogbogboro Quarter (Family), Eghorokueri Quarter and Otumara Quarter.

== Popular Personalities from Omadino Community ==
Some popular personalities from Omadino Community include Chief E. E. Sillo, Capt. Godwin Yomere (Rtd) and emeritus Professor Gabriel Yomere.

== Community Resources ==
Omadino Community is rich in crude oil and is probably one of the richest communities in Nigeria. It plays host to several multinational companies.

== Social Infrastructure ==
There are public and private infrastructures in Omadino Community.

=== Education ===
- Jelu Primary school, Omadino
- Omadino Community Technical College (under construction)
- Eagle Height University (under construction)

=== Health Facilities ===
- Omadino Cottage Hospital, Omadino and an Healthcare center also.

=== Roads and Bridges ===
- Omadino Bridge
- Omadino/Obodo Road

== Cultural Festival ==
Like other Itsekiri communities, Omadino Community is known widely for their Nenuwa dance. Every indigene of Omadino community is allowed to participate in this dance. From June 2022 to September 2022, Omadino Community entertained guests of the Atuwatse III with the dance as they were at Aghofen for the 3 months as part of Ghigho Aghofen. Every December, Omadino celebrates NENUWA DAY where all Omadino indigenes showcase culture and tradition of the town and itsekiri at large..

== See also ==
- Warri
