= Itsekiri people =

Ethnic group of the western Niger Delta

Itsekiri
Iwere
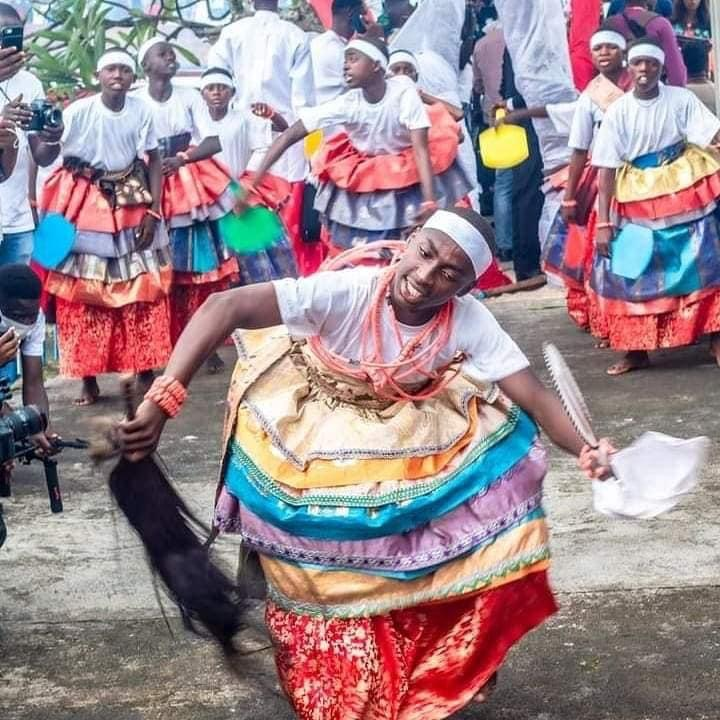
- Children at a coronation event, 2021

Regions with significant populations
- Nigeria (mainly Delta State)

Languages
- Itsekiri; English; Nigerian Pidgin

Religion
- Christianity; traditional religion

Related ethnic groups
- Ijaw; Urhobo; Edo; Yoruba; Igala

The Itsekiri, also known as Iwere, are an ethnic group native to the western Niger Delta of southern Nigeria, mainly in present-day Delta State. Their homeland lies around the Benin, Escravos and Forcados rivers and the adjoining Atlantic coast. The region lies largely within the mangrove swamp belt, with settlements along its rivers and creeks. Older English-language sources also called the people Jekri or Warri.

The Itsekiri language belongs to the Yoruboid language group. It is closely related to southeastern varieties of the Yoruba language and more distantly related to Igala. English and Nigerian Pidgin are also widely used. Itsekiri society developed through the incorporation of communities with different histories of origin, and its traditions reflect interaction with Edo, Urhobo, Ijaw and Yoruba-speaking neighbours.

The Kingdom of Warri, also known as Iwere, is the traditional kingdom of the Itsekiri, ruled by the Olu of Warri. Itsekiri and Benin traditions trace its ruling dynasty to Ginuwa, a prince of Benin who arrived in the western Niger Delta in the late fifteenth century. Several Itsekiri settlements preserve traditions placing their origins before the monarchy. From the sixteenth century, Portuguese missionaries and merchants, followed by other European visitors, influenced the kingdom's religious, political and material history.

Fishing and trade were central to the Itsekiri economy. After Olu Akengbuwa's death in 1848, the monarchy lapsed and authority increasingly passed to leading merchant families. British forces defeated Nana Olomu, the last governor of the Benin River, in 1894, helping to consolidate colonial control over Itsekiri territory. The monarchy was restored under Ginuwa II during colonial rule in 1936.

Warri's petroleum industry employs Itsekiri workers and has attracted migrants from other parts of Nigeria. Itsekiri have also moved from riverine villages to Warri for education and access to urban amenities. In the 1990s and early 2000s, disputes over claims to Warri, local government representation and access to government resources and oil company contracts contributed to violent conflicts involving Itsekiri, Ijaw and Urhobo communities. The Itsekiri language is valued as a marker of ethnic identity. However, many Itsekiri parents interviewed in 2018 reported using English or Nigerian Pidgin with their children instead of Itsekiri, a pattern that threatens the language's survival.

== Names and etymology ==
The people call themselves Itsekiri and Iwere. A popular oral interpretation recorded by J. O. Sagay relates Itsekiri to the expression Itse-kiri-ene, glossed as “blessings surround us”.

Dynastic tradition offers a different account, associating the name with a figure called Itsekiri whom the Ginuwa party encountered at Okotomu. Early European records, however, generally called the polity Iwere, Oere, Aweri or Ourre; Jekri and Itsekiri became common in European-language records during the nineteenth century. Older English-language works also used Warri for both the kingdom and its people.

Neighbouring peoples historically used other names. Lloyd recorded the Urhobo name irhobo, which was sometimes interpreted as meaning “those who float on the water”, and the Ijaw name selemo.

== Geography and settlements ==
Selected settlements and urban centres in the western Niger Delta

The Itsekiri homeland lies in the western Niger Delta, approximately between latitudes 5°20′ and 6°N and longitudes 5°05′ and 5°40′E. Its area is estimated at more than 1,500 sq mi (3,900 km^{2}). The Itsekiri live mainly in the Warri North, Warri South and Warri South West local government areas of western Delta State, alongside Ijaw, Urhobo and other groups.

The Benin, Escravos and Forcados rivers run through the area and are connected by a network of creeks. Most of the homeland lies within the mangrove swamp belt, with firmer ground along its eastern edge. Many settlements stand on dry islands within the swamps.

Ode-Itsekiri, also called Ale Iwere, is the historical royal capital. Other settlements include Ugborodo, Omadino, Ureju, Jakpa and Koko, while Warri City is the principal urban centre within the Itsekiri homeland, and Sapele also has a large Itsekiri population. Using the 1952 census, Lloyd estimated that about one-third of the Itsekiri population then lived in Warri, Sapele, Burutu, Forcados and Lagos.

== History ==
=== Origins and early communities ===
The history of the Itsekiri before the establishment of the Warri monarchy is known largely through oral traditions. Obaro Ikime states that the identity of the original inhabitants of the area into which Ginuwa and his followers moved is unknown.

William A. Moore's 1936 compilation of Itsekiri traditions describes Ijaw, Urhobo (called Sobo in the source) and Mahin communities as living in the region before the Itsekiri coalesced under the Benin prince Ginuwa. Moore also recorded accounts of the umale, figures said to have lived and intermarried among these communities. In the traditions described by Lloyd, the umale were former inhabitants of settlements who later disappeared and became deified.

Several Itsekiri communities have different traditions of origin. Among those recorded by Lloyd, Inorin claimed descent from a son of Umale Okun, the sea deity. Ugborodo, Omadino and Ureju traced their origins to Ode, a Yoruba town in Ijebu Waterside. According to Ugborodo tradition, their ancestors travelled down the coast and first settled at Amatu, about 20 mi (32 km) south of present-day Ugborodo, before moving to the present site. The people of Omadino described themselves as children of Lenuwa, the title of Ode's ruler. The Lenuwa whom Lloyd consulted said that some people from Ode had migrated to Itsekiri country, although he knew no details of the migration, and traced his own ancestors to Benin. Ekurede also traced its founding ancestor to Benin. Lloyd wrote that the dates of these migrations were unknown, although they were then popularly ascribed to the fifteenth century.

Orugbo was said to have been founded by the umale Ibrikimo, Otuekine and Ike, who placed themselves under the Olu's authority but were not permitted to live in the capital. Orere's tradition described a descendant of Ginuwa and an umale settling there at about the same time. Okere was said to have been founded by survivors of a Benin force sent against Ginuwa.

In a 2002 study of Itsekiri visual culture, Kathy Curnow writes that the Itsekiri coalesced under Ginuwa's leadership in the late fifteenth century from peoples of diverse origins. She states that most appear to have migrated into the Delta from several Yoruba polities, particularly the Ijebu region, while other immigrants were said to have been Benin Edo, Igala, or Ijaw.

=== Formation of the Warri Kingdom ===
Itsekiri tradition traces the Warri monarchy to Ginuwa, a son of Oba Olua of the Kingdom of Benin. His departure from Benin is generally placed in the fifteenth century. According to traditions recorded by P. C. Lloyd, Ginuwa fled Benin because his father's tyranny had put him in danger. Landolphe's account suggests that a dispute with a brother over the throne led to his departure. In Obaro Ikime's account, Olua arranged for Ginuwa to leave Benin and establish a new kingdom because their unpopularity had led the Benin people to oppose Ginuwa's succession. In this tradition, he was concealed in a wooden box and accompanied by the sons of seventy Benin chiefs. His party travelled through Ugharegin to Amatu and then Oruselemo, where he married an Ijaw woman. They later moved to Ijala, where Ginuwa died and was buried.

E. J. Alagoa noted that traditions of the Iduwini and Ogulagha Ijaw likewise described Ginuwa and his followers as having moved up the Forcados River from an early coastal settlement at or near Amatu. After Ginuwa's death, his son Ijijen succeeded him and moved the group to Okotomu. According to tradition, they are said to have met a man named Itsekiri at Okotomu, who accepted Ijijen as ruler and gave him land near his own settlement. Ijijen built his capital, Ode-Itsekiri, also known as Ale Iwere, on this land. Lloyd, citing Adams, notes that the capital and Itsekiri's settlement were once separate but later became united when Itsekiri's descendants moved into the capital, where they settled in the Irigbo quarter.

The kingdom grew through the incorporation of existing communities and the founding of new settlements. Ugbolokposo, Obodo and Elume were among the settlements said to have been founded from the capital. Lloyd records traditions describing some of the founders as sons of Ijijen or his brother and successor, Irame.Curnow also notes that rival or breakaway chiefs often fled the capital and founded communities farther away, expanding the kingdom's boundaries.

Settlements retained considerable control over their own affairs, and their ties to the Olu varied. Writing in 1957, Lloyd recorded Ugborodo's tradition that its people had arrived at about the same time as Ginuwa and had only recently begun to recognise the Olu as their king.

Lloyd also reported frequent intermarriage between the descendants of settlers from Ode in Ijebu Waterside and those of Ginuwa and his entourage. In his 1957 account, he stated that the Itsekiri recognised no difference in culture or dialect between the two groups.

The early kingdom's political relationship with Benin is not completely clear. Alagoa interpreted early Portuguese descriptions of Warri as a "port of Benin" as suggesting initial subordination, and argued that Portuguese trade and missionary activity may have helped an existing Itsekiri state develop independence from Benin. Ryder suggested that Portuguese support may have encouraged the emergence of an independent Itsekiri state after 1530, but described this reconstruction as conjectural. Joseph Kenny dates the development of Itsekiri trade with Europeans independently of Benin to the second half of the sixteenth century.

Curnow argues that no ceremonial or other evidence supports the suggestion that Warri was subject to Benin. She notes that the Oba of Benin did not confirm new Olus, as he did the rulers of other subject peoples, nor were Itsekiri rulers buried at Benin. Instead, Itsekiri royal burials took place at Ijala, a settlement founded by the first Olu, Ginuwa, who died and was buried there. Curnow notes that such burial at a dynastic centre was a common means of reinforcing origins, comparing this with the former Benin practice of sending the remains of deceased Obas to Ife. She further adds that many more early travellers to the region described Warri as autonomous, and argues that any tribute, if it was ever paid, seems to have been sporadic and connected with trade privileges rather than political dominance. At the same time, she stresses that the dynastic blood relationship between the Edo and Itsekiri royal houses was never disputed, and says that the family relationship was more often marked by "filial rivalry". Ikime states that eighteenth-century accounts described the Olu as an independent ruler. He nevertheless records a custom of seeking the Oba's blessing when an Olu was selected, citing a request made before Ginuwa II's installation in 1936, at the end of the interregnum.

=== Atlantic trade and European relations ===
The Itsekiri were among the earliest peoples in present-day Nigeria to establish sustained relations with Europeans, encompassing commerce, diplomacy and missionary activity. Portuguese mariners had reached the estuaries of the Benin, Escravos and Forcados rivers by the late fifteenth century, although surviving records do not establish the precise date of their first direct contact with the Itsekiri.

At the beginning of the sixteenth century, the Portuguese explorer Duarte Pacheco Pereira described settlements near the mouth of the Benin River. Among them was a village that he rendered as Teebuu. The similarity of its name and location has led to its association with present-day Itsekiri Tebu, although Pereira supplied no information establishing continuity between the two settlements. A later Itsekiri tradition recorded by William A. Moore instead attributes the foundation of Tebu to Ifie-Agbuje during the nineteenth-century interregnum.

Pereira also recorded a place of barter five leagues up the left branch of the Forcados River. Portuguese merchants obtained enslaved people, cotton cloth, panther skins, palm oil and objects called coris there in exchange for brass and copper bracelets. Its stated position was in the general direction of Ode-Itsekiri, although it was not far enough inland to correspond with the present site. E. J. Alagoa suggested that it may have been an early site of Warri before the capital was established farther inland. He argued that Portuguese merchants were drawn to an existing centre of political authority and regional commerce; overseas trade expanded this system rather than creating the kingdom itself.

Documented relations between Portugal and the Warri court expanded during the later sixteenth century. An Augustinian mission from São Tomé established itself at Ode-Itsekiri, which Portuguese correspondence also called Cidade de Santo Agostinho. A royal prince was baptised Sebastian and had become Olu by 1597.

In 1600, Olu Sebastian sent his eldest son, Dom Domingos, to Portugal. Domingos studied at the Hieronymite college in Coimbra and later at Augustinian and Jesuit institutions in Lisbon. Before returning to Warri, he married Maria Pereira, a Portuguese noblewoman and granddaughter of the Count of Feira. He returned in 1611, accompanied by his wife, a chaplain and ten servants, and later succeeded as Olu Atuwatse I.

Later Olus continued to correspond with Portuguese rulers and the papacy. In a letter dated 20 November 1652, the Olu asked Pope Innocent X to send Capuchin missionaries to Warri. He said that no priest had been in the kingdom for more than seven years and offered his own obedience and that of his kingdom to the pope. He also asked for priests to be sent each year on trading ships travelling from Lisbon via São Tomé.

Portuguese commercial influence declined as Dutch and English merchants expanded their activities during the seventeenth century. The Dutch West India Company entered the Forcados River in 1643 or 1644, principally to purchase enslaved people, and considered establishing a trading post at the Itsekiri capital. Within about a year, however, company policy shifted towards the Angolan trade, while the other cargoes available at Warri did not justify navigating approximately thirty miles of difficult creeks. The voyages were consequently suspended and never resumed. Portuguese commercial and missionary contact nevertheless continued intermittently into the eighteenth century.

French merchants also attempted to enter the trade. In 1786, Captain Jean-François Landolphe established a fortified factory for the Compagnie d'Owhère et de Bénin on Borodo Island in the Benin River. On an earlier voyage in 1783, Landolphe had taken Marc Boudakan, a nephew of Olu Erejuwa, first to Saint-Domingue and then to France. Boudakan was presented at the French court and remained in France until 1786, when he returned with Landolphe. The factory operated for six years before British commercial rivals attacked and burned it in 1792.

=== Regional trade and the nineteenth-century economy ===
Before the development of sustained European commerce, Itsekiri communities exchanged fish, crayfish, mangrove salt and pottery for yams, plantains, pepper and other agricultural produce from Urhobo and other hinterland communities. The Benin River and the interconnected western Niger Delta waterways linked Itsekiri settlements with the Lagos and Ijebu lagoons to the west, Bonny to the east, and the Urhobo, Isoko and Benin hinterlands. Large canoes carried traders and cargoes between riverbank markets, and European overseas commerce was added to these existing networks rather than creating them.

By the late sixteenth century, the Itsekiri had become important commercial intermediaries between European ships and communities of the western Niger Delta hinterland. Their position was supported by their knowledge of the waterways, their canoe fleets and the political organisation of the Kingdom of Warri. Goods passing through Warri included enslaved people, ivory, pepper, cotton cloth, palm oil and other regional products, while imports included textiles, brass and copper goods, coral and glass beads, tobacco and firearms.

By the early nineteenth century, the Olu was described as the kingdom's chief trader. Royal representatives also collected customs payments, known as comey, before visiting merchants were permitted to begin trading. The officer responsible for receiving these payments and supervising the Olu's commercial interests was known to European merchants as the Governor of the River.

The overseas trade in enslaved people was an important element of Warri's external commerce. Enslaved people reached Warri through inland markets, debt pledges, the sale of people expelled from their communities for serious offences, and trade routes from Benin and Yoruba-speaking areas. Some were exported overseas, while others were employed locally as canoe paddlers, agricultural workers, domestic servants and commercial agents. As the Atlantic trade declined during the nineteenth century, a growing proportion were retained and incorporated into the local economy. As the overseas slave trade declined, palm oil became the principal export. In the late 1840s, two Liverpool firms established factories on the Benin River: Horsfall's near Bobi and Harrison's near Jakpa Creek. Their arrival began a new period of commercial expansion. Palm oil was bulky, and many producing markets lay far upriver, requiring large canoes, organised crews, trading depots and substantial credit. European firms advanced goods and credit, known as trust, to prominent Itsekiri merchants, who distributed them through agents and returned with palm oil. Wealth derived from this system increasingly became a source of political authority.

Among the leading nineteenth-century merchants were Diare, Tsanomi, Numa, Dudu and Olomu. Olomu developed extensive commercial relationships in Urhoboland, established depots at inland markets and widened sections of creek near Okpara Waterside and Igun to improve access for his trading canoes. His alliances included commercial friendships and marriage ties with the communities in which he traded. His son Nana Olomu inherited and enlarged this network of canoes, agents, trading posts and hinterland alliances.

Women also held important commercial roles. Iye, known to European merchants as “Queen Dola”, was a wealthy trader during the mid-nineteenth century, while a woman named Igba was one of the principal traders at Warri in the early 1890s. Writing at the end of the century, Mary Kingsley similarly observed that some Itsekiri women were “very rich and great traders”.

=== Interregnum and colonial rule ===
Olu Akengbuwa died on 14 June 1848. Within the following days, two of his sons and likely successors also died. No new Olu was installed for eighty-eight years. Ode-Itsekiri declined as people moved towards the commercial settlements of the lower Benin River, while political authority became dispersed among royal descendants, wealthy merchants and other leading figures.

Before the interregnum, the Olu maintained representatives on the Benin River who collected trading dues and dealt with European shipping; these officials were known as Governors of the River. After Akengbuwa's death, however, the office acquired a different political role. In 1851, after an unsuccessful attempt to secure agreement on a new Olu, British consul John Beecroft convened leading men from the river settlements. Representatives from the north bank selected Diare, who was recognised as Chief or Governor of the Benin River. Successive Governors of the River became important political figures during the interregnum, although the governorship did not reproduce the Olu's authority and its holders instead depended on commercial influence, alliances and negotiation with other Itsekiri leaders and European consuls to exercise their authority.

The breakdown of central political authority during the interregnum did not dissolve Itsekiri identity. Ikime attributed its preservation to the continuing prestige of the Olu and Ode-Itsekiri, intermarriage between settlements, religious and other ceremonies shared across Itsekiriland, the compactness of the territory and relatively small population, and common commercial interests. The Governors of the River, appointed from 1851, also provided an authority around which the Itsekiri could coordinate their dealings with European traders and protect common interests.

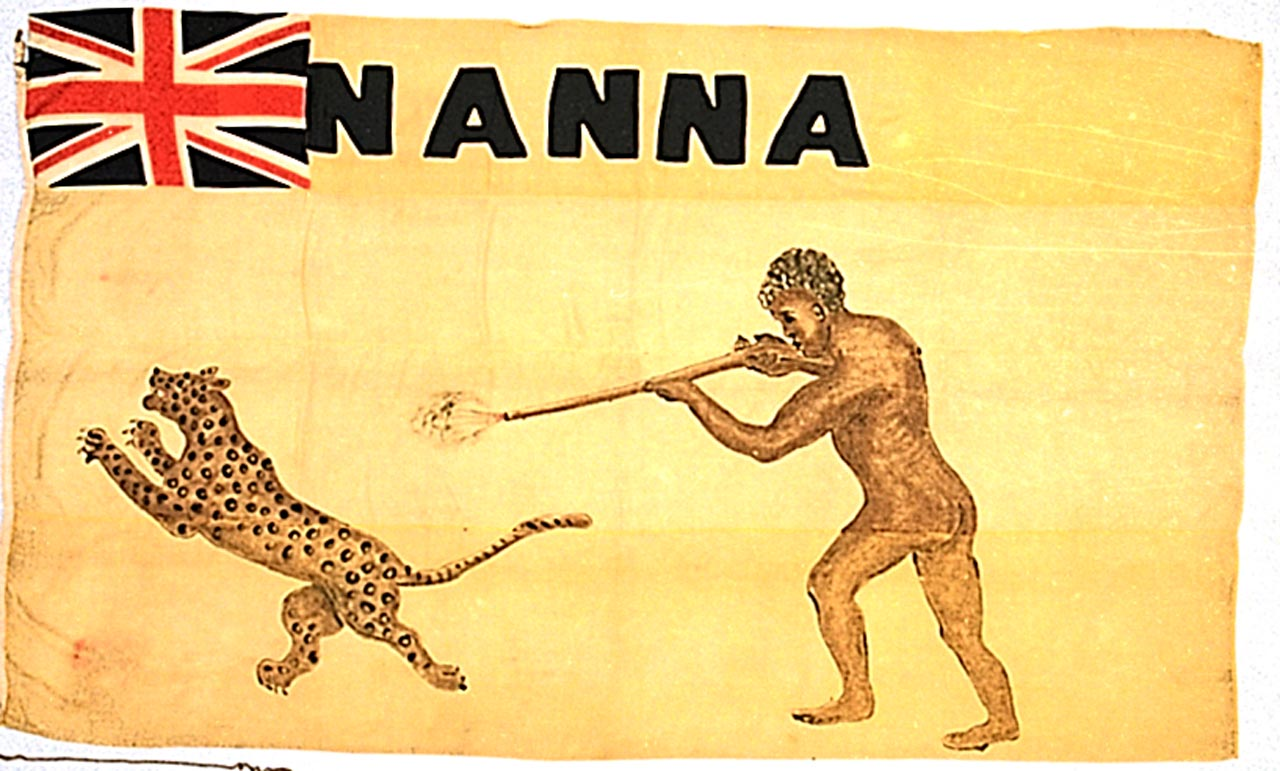
Personal flag of Nana Olomu, captured during the British expedition of 1894

Nana Olomu became Governor of the Benin River in 1884. The protection treaties signed that year left a clause permitting European merchants unrestricted access to hinterland markets for further negotiation. British attempts to bypass the Itsekiri intermediary system and impose direct commercial control culminated in the attack on Nana's headquarters at Ebrohimi in 1894. His defeat ended the political dominance of the merchant-governors. Colonial administration subsequently operated through courts, appointed local authorities and changing schemes of indirect rule, altering relations within Itsekiri society and with neighbouring communities.

Colonial taxation produced a different kind of regional politics. In 1927, Itsekiri and Urhobo traders, Ijaw pilots, farmers and residents of several multiethnic towns coordinated a successful boycott of trade in protest against the new tax system and the economic crisis in the palm-oil belt. The boycott demonstrated substantial cooperation across ethnic lines. The administrative reorganisation that followed from 1928 to 1938 instead divided communities into supposedly discrete taxable units and tied local treasuries, representation and development spending more closely to ethnic categories. Disputes over land, jurisdiction and political authority consequently acquired greater institutional weight.

The monarchy was restored under Ginuwa II in 1936. In the same year, the Jekri–Sobo Native Administration was divided into separate Itsekiri and Western Sobo administrations; separate treasuries followed in 1937, and the joint division was formally split in 1949. Oghenetoja Okoh argues that these measures strengthened ethnic political organisation and sharpened competition over authority and resources.

=== Late colonial and postcolonial politics ===
Before the interregnum, the monarch was known as the Olu, or king, of Warri. At the restoration of the monarchy in 1936, however, the colonial administration recognised the newly installed Olu, Ginuwa II, as the “Olu of Itsekiri” rather than the “Olu of Warri”. Urhobo representatives had opposed “Olu of Warri” because Warri was also the name of a multi-ethnic colonial province, and they feared that the title implied authority over its other peoples.

Itsekiri leaders continued to campaign for official recognition of “Olu of Warri”. In 1952, the Action Group government of the Western Region, allied with the Warri National Union, restored the historical title to official use, replacing “Olu of Itsekiri”. Opponents feared that the title implied authority over non-Itsekiri inhabitants of Warri Province. The decision provoked protests and violence, and the regional government renamed Warri Province as Delta Province while retaining the royal title. Okoh identifies the controversy as a turning point in the connection between ethnic identity, territorial claims and party politics in the western Niger Delta.

Itsekiri leaders and associations also participated in wider campaigns for minority representation after the Second World War. Their position within larger regional and national political structures remained a concern as Nigeria approached independence. After independence, disputes over local-government boundaries, territorial authority and access to petroleum-related revenues became central to politics in the Warri area.

Between 1997 and 2003, disputes over local-government boundaries and headquarters, political representation, land claims and access to petroleum-related benefits contributed to recurrent violence around Warri. The most sustained clashes involved Ijaw and Itsekiri armed groups, while separate violence also occurred between Itsekiri and Urhobo groups. Hundreds of people were killed, settlements were destroyed and residents were displaced. Human Rights Watch linked the escalation to political competition, oil revenues, arms and failures of government protection and accountability.

The violence also disrupted travel, trading and daily life in the creeks. In September 2003, Itsekiri leaders reported that more than thirty of their communities had been attacked and remained largely deserted. Human Rights Watch cautioned that the number of affected settlements was difficult to establish, but documented displacement lasting months and little government assistance. Its investigation concluded that Itsekiri villages had borne the greater share of organised attacks in the riverine violence since March 2003, while also documenting attacks by Itsekiri militia on Ijaw communities.

== Contemporary society ==
=== Urbanisation and livelihoods ===
Movement from creek settlements to towns has linked fishing and local commerce with education and wage employment. By the 1950s, children from settlements without nearby schools were often sent to Warri or other educational centres, while fishing remained central to rural livelihoods. Warri's expansion as a commercial and petroleum centre accelerated urbanisation after the middle of the twentieth century. The city's total population, including all ethnic groups, increased from fewer than 50,000 in 1960 to more than 300,000 in 2006. In interviews conducted in 2018, Itsekiri participants described moving to Warri and Sapele for schools, work and public services.

Access to employment and services has been a recurring issue in settlements near oil installations. Amnesty International's 2005 investigation of Ugborodo described an unsafe jetty, a poorly equipped school and limited electricity and water supplies within sight of Chevron's Escravos terminal. Residents complained about access to company jobs and contracts; Chevron denied allegations of discrimination.

=== Women's community protests ===
In July 2002, women from Ugborodo occupied Chevron's Escravos terminal in a peaceful protest demanding employment for local people and improvements to community infrastructure. The occupation formed part of a wider wave of women's protests in the Niger Delta that also involved Ijaw communities and multiethnic organising in Warri.

The Ugborodo occupation ended after the community, Chevron and the Delta State government agreed to a five-year memorandum of understanding covering infrastructure, employment, scholarships and training. Residents later complained that many of the agreed projects had been delayed. Chevron attributed the delays to renewed violence in the area, which it said had prevented it from carrying out some of its obligations.

== Culture ==
Itsekiri cultural life developed in the riverine environment of the western Niger Delta and around the institutions of the Kingdom of Warri. It shares many features with the wider Niger Delta while also reflecting centuries of interaction with Edo, Ijaw, Urhobo and Yoruba-speaking peoples, as well as with Portuguese and other European visitors.

Although the Itsekiri language is Yoruboid and some traditions identify migrants from Yoruba-speaking polities, Curnow describes the Yoruba imprint on Itsekiri culture outside language as minimal. She notes that the Yoruba pantheon is largely unrepresented and that most Itsekiri dancing, drumming, textile traditions, masquerade practices, architecture and sculpture are dissimilar from Yoruba forms, instead characterising the Itsekiri as key participants in broader Niger Delta cultural patterns.

Chief Brown Mene, the Ogua-Olusan of Warri Kingdom, discusses the Itsekiri homeland, language, dress and cultural similarities with neighbouring peoples (2024).

=== Traditional political organisation ===
In the political organisation described in Lloyd's 1957 ethnography and Ikime's historical study, government combined the authority of the Olu of Warri with that of the titled chiefs, or ojoye. The chiefs formed a council that advised the Olu in the government of the kingdom and could also meet in his absence. Most chiefly titles were conferred by the Olu rather than belonging permanently to a closed hereditary aristocracy, although hereditary claims attached to several senior offices. The Ologbotsere and Iyatsere titles were described as hereditary, although traditions concerning the reassignment of the Iyatsere title suggested that succession was not strictly hereditary. Claims that the Ojomo and Uwangue titles were invariably hereditary were likewise challenged by other traditions. The Ologbotsere served as the Olu's principal adviser, the Iyatsere as war chief, the Uwangue as royal spokesman and custodian of regalia, the Olekun as an intermediary between the Olu and those who had offended him, and the Ojomo as an army commander. Chieftaincy was historically concentrated at Ode-Itsekiri. At the time of Lloyd's fieldwork, elders of several older settlements maintained that their communities had never participated in it.

The authority of the monarchy did not amount to uniform administration of the settlements. In these accounts, chiefs were not remembered as having exercised jurisdiction over any village outside the capital, and no kingdom-wide political association linked all Itsekiri communities. Matters ordinarily arose first within the family and could pass successively through meetings of the descent-group segment, quarter and village, while serious disputes between settlements could be referred to the Olu and his council.

Village authority usually involved an Olare-aja, generally the most senior competent male, and an okpanran, the priest of the founding ancestor or local umale. Ikime described the Olare-aja and okpanran as jointly heading the village council of elders and noted that the office of Olare-aja was often held by the oldest competent member of the founder's patrilineage, whether or not he was the oldest man in the community. The relative prominence of the two offices varied. The Olare-aja generally presided in newer settlements, whereas in some of the oldest communities the okpanran chaired village meetings and the Olare-aja dealt principally with the affairs of his own descent group.

=== Kinship and inheritance ===
In Lloyd's account of 1957, Itsekiri belonged to descent groups called ebi or ubi, whose membership could be traced through any combination of male and female links. When identifying an ebi, a person named important ancestors without regard to the number of female links in the line of descent. Literate Itsekiri commonly used the English word “house” for an ebi. The term ubi sometimes indicated a greater depth of ancestry than ebi. A person could belong to several houses, although regular participation was usually concentrated in the one or two most closely connected with residence, upbringing or prominent ancestors. During Lloyd's fieldwork, the best-known houses were associated with figures such as Olu Erejuwa, Olu Akengbuwa, Udefi, Ologbotsere Eyinmisaren and Iyatsere Egharegbemi. Lloyd later classified the Itsekiri houses as cognatic descent groups because affiliation could pass through either men or women.

Within these houses, omere described people whose connection passed through a common female ancestor, while egusa described those connected through a common male ancestor. The omere relationship was regarded as stronger. Branches called igogo normally formed among the descendants of a woman, although there were exceptions within major descent groups such as those of Ologbotsere Eyinmisaren and Iyatsere Egharegbemi, where the term was also used for branches of a group descended from a man.

The family meeting, or eguare ebi, considered proposed marriages, the conduct and welfare of members, obligations to ancestors and the maintenance of ancestral shrines. Where a chiefly title was regarded as the group’s corporate property, the meeting also considered candidates for it. Meetings were presided over by an olori ebi, usually the oldest male of the senior genealogical generation, although he did not have to be a patrilineal descendant of the ancestor from whom the group traced its descent. Rank within the meeting therefore followed genealogical seniority rather than personal age alone.

Lloyd distinguished these houses from the patrilineage, for which he found no single Itsekiri term. A person belonged to one patrilineage but could belong to several houses. The patrilineage rarely met or acted as a distinct group. Its members instead met together with relatives connected to the lineage through maternal links. Patrilineal affiliation nevertheless remained important in inheritance, burial and succession to certain ritual responsibilities.

In the inheritance practices recorded in 1957, the eldest son normally became the priest of his deceased father and received a double share of his property. He also took the objects that represented family headship and assumed custody of corporate property such as land, fishing rights and titles. Other movable property was shared equally among the sons, while daughters were usually given a smaller share. If there were no sons, the daughters inherited all the movable property. Movable property passed to a brother of the deceased only when there were no children or when it had been given to him as a gift.

=== Marriage and funerary customs ===
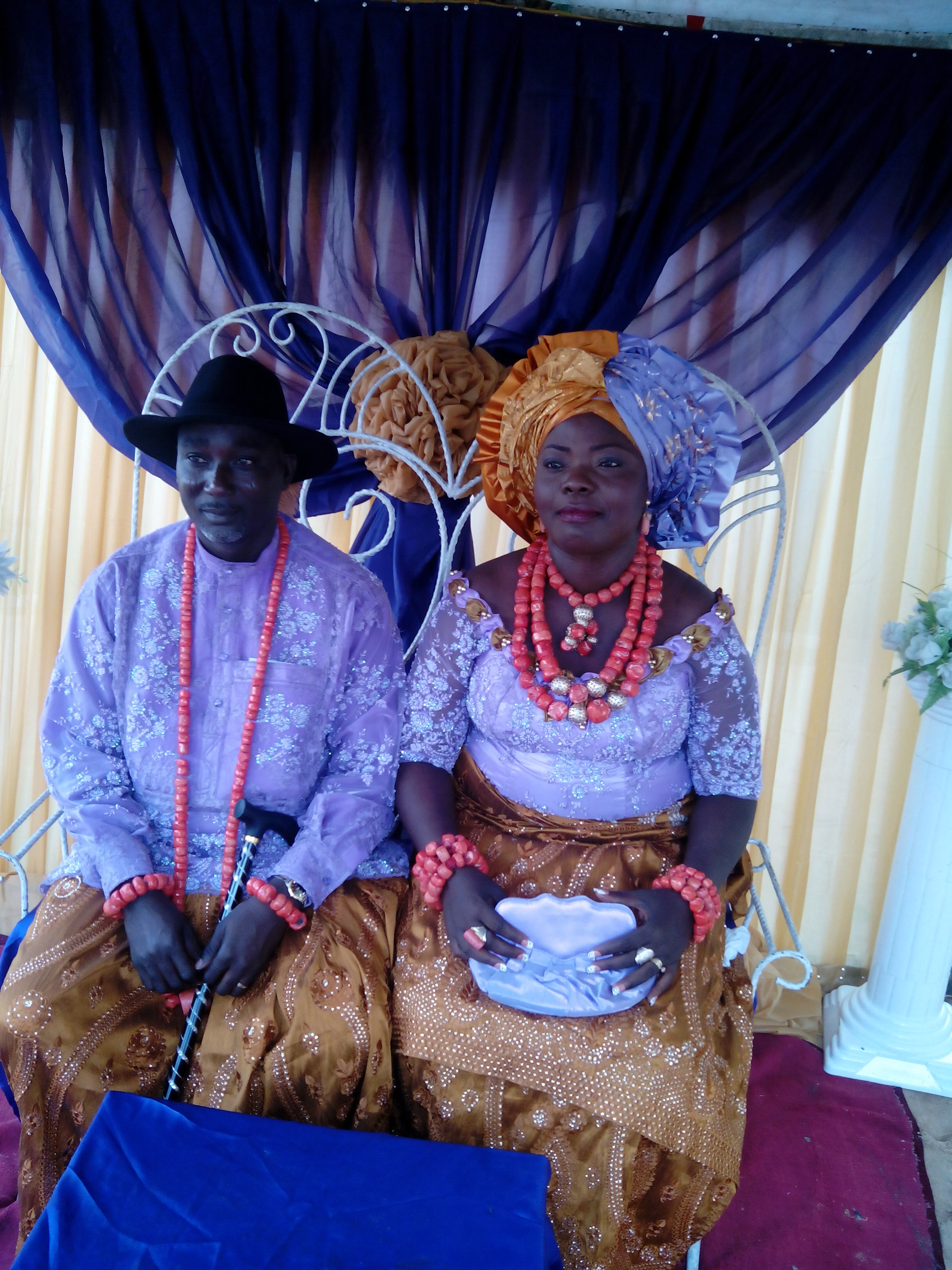
An Itsekiri couple at a marriage ceremony

Marriage traditionally involved the wider families of the couple. Lloyd recorded that proposed marriages were considered at family meetings, whose elders ensured that the couple were not related within the prohibited degrees. In the marriage ceremony he described, kola nuts and gin were presented while the family head invoked the ancestors to bless the union, and marriage payments were otherwise relatively small. Marriage was prohibited between people who traced descent from a common ancestor within seven generations. In practice, however, genealogical knowledge did not always extend far enough for more distant relationships to be known or traced. Curnow notes that in the late 1980s Olu Erejuwa II ruled that very distant relatives could marry, but that most Itsekiri still considered any degree of known relationship, however remote, to be incest. She describes the Itsekiri as treating intermarriage as the rule rather than the exception and, citing Lloyd, notes that by the 1950s about 22 per cent of Itsekiri had Urhobo mothers, adding that the figure seemed to have increased since then. Children of interethnic unions were generally considered to have their father's ethnicity.

In the funerary practices recorded in Lloyd's 1957 ethnography, the dead were normally buried in the burial ground of their patrilineage, usually in the house or quarter of their most remotely remembered paternal ancestor. Sons of an Olu were an exception to the usual patrilineal rule, as they were often buried in compounds belonging to their mothers' patrilineages. When a body could not be transported to its customary burial place, it was interred where the person died, while the hair and nails were wrapped in white cloth and taken to the lineage grave for a second burial. If neither the body nor the hair and nails were available, a palm branch was used in a ceremony to call the person's spirit home and was buried as a substitute. Burial ceremonies featured dancing, drumming and sacrifices to the ancestors on the day of interment, during any later symbolic burial, and again on the seventh, fourteenth and twenty-eighth days after death. Not all bodies, however, were admitted to lineage graves. Bodies bearing visible ulcers or sores, along with those of people who died by suicide, drowning or in childbirth, or who were regarded as witches following confession or ordeal, were disposed of in the bush.

=== Traditional social distinctions ===
Commoners were known as omajaja. P. C. Lloyd described oton olu, rendered in English as prince or princess, as a temporary designation limited to an Olu's children during his reign and the reign of the next Olu. After that reign, they and their children were classed as commoners. During the nineteenth-century interregnum, however, descendants of Erejuwa and Akengbuwa continued to use princely titles in order to preserve their claims to the throne.

Enslaved people were called eru, and their descendants oton-eru. In his 1957 account, Lloyd described ibi edo, or "house members", as a term for enslaved people whose parents were also enslaved. He noted that it was then being used in place of "slave".

Older accounts divided males among five successive stages of life. Ometie referred to boys under about twenty, who learned trades and performed simple duties for their families and communities. Edema, roughly between twenty and thirty-five, marked the period when a man was expected to establish himself independently and earn his own living. Ighele, approximately thirty-five to fifty-five, comprised able-bodied men expected to take an active part in community affairs. Olare and eligbo referred to elders, with the latter generally consisting of very old men who no longer participated actively in community affairs. Lloyd described the same sequence more generally as childhood, adolescence, manhood, elderhood and old age, and stressed that these were stages of social status rather than organised age-grade associations acting collectively in political or ritual matters.

In 2023, Ogiame Atuwatse III announced that the palace would no longer use the term omajaja, saying that it had acquired a negative connotation, and encouraged the use of Omiwere as a collective designation for Itsekiri people. He declared all Itsekiri freeborn while stating that the change did not affect succession to the throne.

=== Names and appellations ===
Itsekiri personal names often reflect the circumstances of a child's birth or those of the person giving the name. Alero is given to the first daughter, even if she has older brothers. Aritetseoma, meaning "There is none that is not a child", affirms the value of daughters and is given especially when a mother has had no sons. Abinoko means "Born on a canoe", while Abejiwa means "Arrived during the rains". Names can also express prayers, advice or beliefs. Ajueitsegbemi, meaning "Spare me this child", expresses a prayer for the child's protection. Omasanjuwa, "A child is better than wealth", stresses the value of children, while Anukube, "Death cannot be bribed", reflects the belief that death comes to everyone. Other names refer indirectly to family difficulties, so understanding their significance may require knowing the circumstances in which they were given.

Itsekiri also greet and hail people by appellations known as akpuja, including when addressing elders. In his 1957 account, P. C. Lloyd described a man reaching middle age adopting an appellation previously borne by his father or paternal grandfather. The name used to salute an older member of the family would then be used to address him in public. An appellation could also come from a maternal grandfather, although Lloyd found this uncommon.

When a man became a chief, the appellation attached to his office took precedence over those inherited from his family, which continued to be used as secondary appellations. Lloyd recorded Ajabo as the appellation of the Ologbotsere and Uji as that of the Iyatsere. Women who hold chiefly titles bear akpuja as well. Theresa Egbe-Ikimi was installed as Ejumotan of Warri in 2023 with the appellation Olurujo; at the same ceremony, Ebiyemi Omatseye became Olujimi of Warri and bore the appellation Ebebe-Olusin.

Appellations could also commemorate particular actions. Moore records that Prince Omateye received the appellation Akpojorukuda after saving an enslaved man who had been condemned to death. Moore explains the name as describing someone who turns a day of death into one of salvation.

Some prominent Itsekiri adopted Ijaw appellations. Nana Olomu bore the Ijaw appellations Opubeni, translated as "mighty flood that floods everywhere", and Dedeikumo, translated as "All, shut up!"

=== Riverine life and material culture ===
Much of the Itsekiri homeland was mangrove swamp, with little land suitable for farming. In fieldwork conducted in 1955–56, Lloyd found fishing to be the main occupation in rural settlements. Fish were caught behind fences as the tide fell, with nets and spring-loaded fishing rods, or in baskets set along creek banks. Farther out, fishermen fixed rows of large conical baskets to posts in rivers and estuaries to catch crayfish. Lloyd noted that setting these baskets in rough water required knowing how deep to place them. The dried catch was an important trade good.

Fishing rights in the smaller creeks were granted by village heads and could pass to the grantee's sons or daughters. Fishermen who moved towards the coast to set up their own lines of crayfish baskets paid fees to the heads of those villages. Lloyd described coastal crayfishing as men's work, sometimes assisted by their wives, while women also kept baskets and traps in creeks near home. Moore listed fishing and petty trade among women's livelihoods, and Ikime described their part in the local trade in fish, crayfish, salt and pottery.

These goods were exchanged with farming communities inland, especially the Urhobo, for yams, plantains and, later, cassava products. Salt was made by burning the leaves and shoots of white mangrove or the shoots and roots of red mangrove, filtering water through the ashes and boiling the resulting liquid. By Lloyd's time, imported salt had displaced much of the local product, although its stronger taste was still preferred in some dishes. He also recorded that mangrove cutting had depended on enslaved labour in the nineteenth century; the loss of that labour was cited as another reason for the industry's decline.

Women made pots in several villages, particularly Orere and Ugbuwangue. They also planted reeds for making mats and made baskets from reeds and raffia. The pots, like fish and salt, were traded inland. Local blacksmiths made hoes, knives and axes; in the nineteenth century, silversmiths also made bracelets and chains, sometimes from silver dollars. Moore listed carpentry and woodcarving among men's trades.

Canoes were used for fishing, trade and warfare. Lloyd described shallow canoes used by the Itsekiri in the rougher coastal waters and deeper ones in the calmer interior creeks. At the time of his fieldwork, he said, most of these canoes were made by Ijaw builders. In the nineteenth century, wealthy traders kept fleets of cannon-armed war canoes to protect their settlements and trading posts. Large war canoes had about forty paddlers and room for another forty armed men; trading canoes with twenty paddlers could carry roughly six tons of palm oil. Few canoes were still that large when Lloyd visited. The British Museum holds Itsekiri paddles from the late nineteenth and early twentieth centuries. Their decoration includes openwork handles, carved human figures and geometric patterns cut into the wood. Several are catalogued as ceremonial paddles.

Houses differed according to what terrain they stood on. Lloyd found mud-walled houses on firm ground, while houses in the swamps had palm-rib walls and plank floors raised on posts. He recorded that mud for houses in the Benin River District was brought by canoe from the Benin, some 40 miles away. Older villages such as Orugbo, Orere and Inorin had small houses arranged in quarters, with an open-sided hall for meetings and ceremonies. In newer settlements, wealthy households had built larger compounds, with the family head's house facing a shrine to his father and a hall used for festival dancing. Lloyd said such compounds were no longer being built when he visited.

Fish and crayfish appear in several dishes associated with Itsekiri cooking. Banga soup is made from palm-fruit extract, seasoned with spices and often cooked with fish or meat. It is commonly served with cassava starch. Owo is made with palm oil; a recipe given by Matse Uwatse includes fish, crayfish and garri or starch, and she describes it as a dish served at celebrations. Both soups are eaten in other Niger Delta communities as well. Gbagba ofofo is an okra soup. A recipe published in The Punch uses catfish, prawns and periwinkles and describes it as usually eaten with starch or egun obobo, a mixture of starch and ripe plantain.

Moore recorded an Itsekiri tradition about the arrival of cassava. In his account, Portuguese sailors first gave prepared garri to Ginuwa's people at Ijala. On a later visit, after Ginuwa's death, they brought cassava plants and showed his successors how to process them; Olu Irame then entrusted their cultivation to the Agbassa community. Dapper described manioc being cultivated at Warri and made into flour in his account published in 1668. Barbot also described cassava bread in a work published in 1732.

=== Dress and visual culture ===
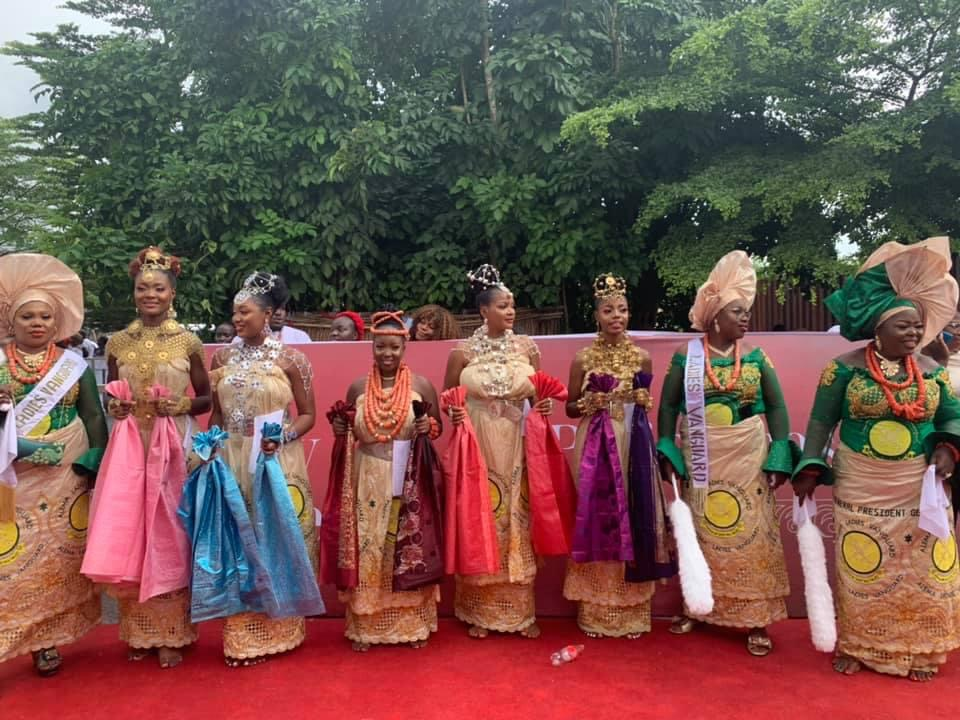
Itsekiri women in traditional attire at a coronation event in 2021

At ceremonies, Itsekiri men commonly wear a long-sleeved kemeje shirt with a George wrapper, coral beads or metal chains, and a feathered ekoro hat. Women wear one or two wrappers with a fitted blouse, jewellery and a knotted head-tie called an ulesun. Imported madras and George cloth, filigree jewellery and European-style hats also became part of Itsekiri dress. The waistcoat is called culete in Itsekiri, a name adapted from Portuguese colete.

Photographs from the first half of the twentieth century show Itsekiri chiefs in long, caped garments based on Catholic clerical dress. By the 1990s, Curnow described them as wearing long-sleeved white shirts, white wrappers and scarlet sashes. Itsekiri chiefs attributed this change to Urhobo chiefs adopting their caped style. Itsekiri chiefs also wore the oronwu, a neckpiece with a central bead whose core is covered in seed beads arranged in contrasting geometric patterns, and a large coral bead on each side. The oronwu was associated with priestly authority. Only chiefs were supposed to wear it publicly, although other Itsekiri could wear it during ancestral rites. The oronwu appears in the earliest available nineteenth-century photographs. It was worn with oron okun, circlets made of dark red stone and originating in Benin, and a large coral bead hanging from a long strand of plaited seed beads.

The uda and eberen swords, coral collar and older coral crown came from Benin court traditions. Two cross-topped metal crowns later replaced the coral crown as the Olu's official crowns, one used for coronations and the other for major state occasions. Itsekiri tradition holds that Olu Atuwatse I (Dom Domingos) brought them back from Portugal, where he had studied. Olu Atuwatse III introduced a new pair of gold and silver crowns at his coronation in 2021. The Olu's formal robes drew on Portuguese church dress. Ginuwa II wore a caped robe at his installation in 1936; Atuwatse II wore a gold brocade cape at his in 1987. At state ceremonies, the Olu wore several rosaries alongside coral necklaces and stone bead circlets. Curnow notes that the rosaries served no Catholic religious purpose but were essential to kingship and retained a protective role. She interprets the rosaries and the Olu’s cross-topped European crowns as sacred symbols of the kingdom’s unique history that gives the Itsekiri prominence.

Families also preserved garments and imported objects as heirlooms. At coronation anniversaries during Atuwatse II's reign, they displayed such possessions in competitions for historical dress and antiques. Curnow recorded one entrant who won with a French bicorne hat kept by his family. Atuwatse II also supported newer palace art, including cast-bronze portraits of royal relatives and carved doors depicting past monarchs, some based on photographs. Curnow interpreted these commissions as a deliberate response to Benin's established tradition of court art.

=== Oral and performing arts ===
Itsekiri oral arts include folktales, songs, poetry, proverbs, riddles, tongue-twisters and children's games. Moonlight games traditionally brought children and teenagers together after the evening meal in family compounds or village squares. Performances combined call-and-response singing, clapping, dance, physical contests and dramatised stories, serving as recreation and as an informal means of teaching language, cooperation and social values. Examples documented by Ovie-Jack in a 2021 study include Abere ma, a flexibility game performed to song; Ekokoro, a blindfolded team game; and Otoori, a form of hide-and-seek. Some songs used an attack-and-rejoinder structure comparable to the Urhobo udje dance-song tradition. Regular performance of the games was reported to have declined after the 1990s with modernisation and the growth of newer forms of entertainment.

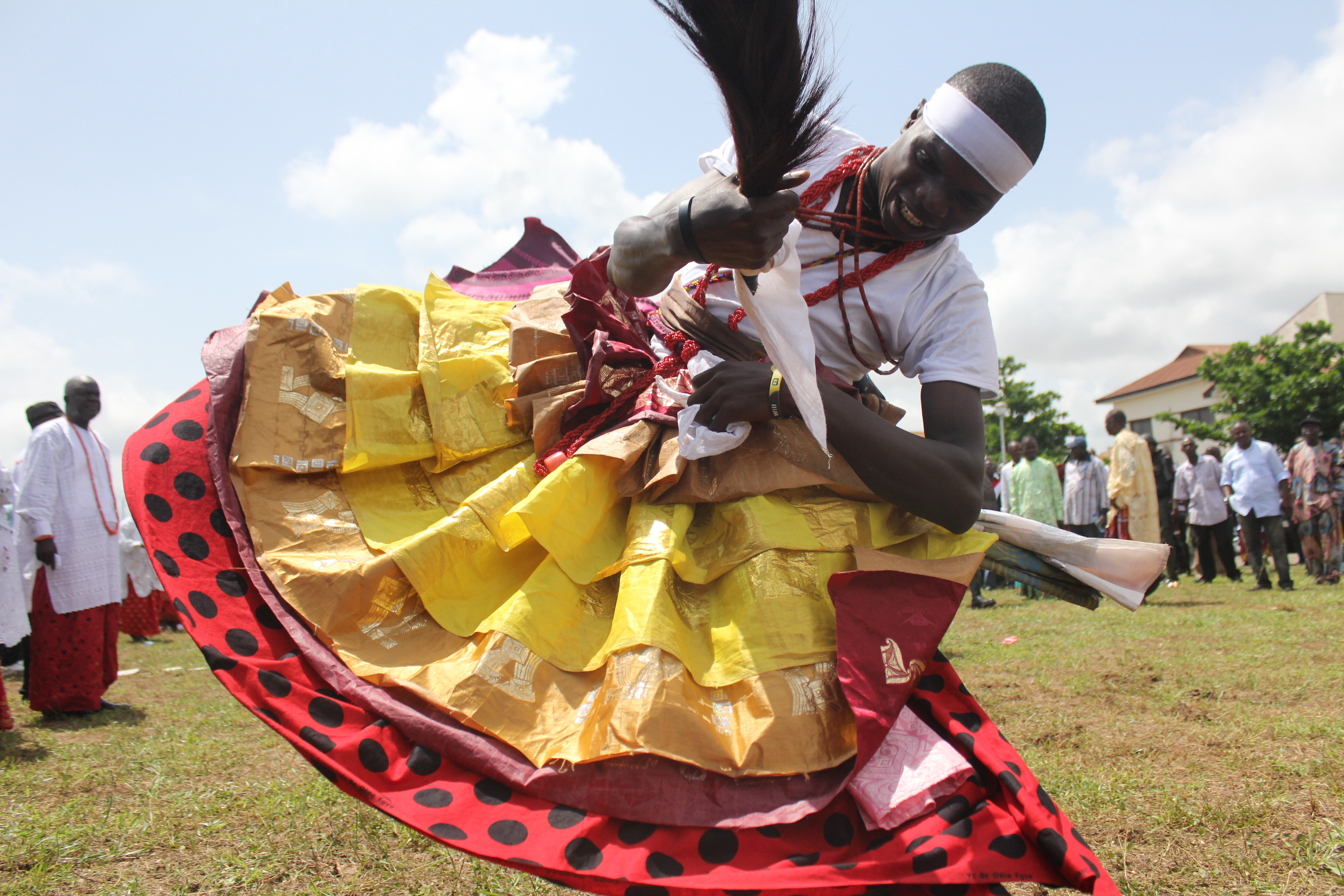
An Omoko dancer

Other Itsekiri performance traditions include Omoko, an acrobatic dance performed in a layered, brightly coloured costume. Wrappers form the base of the costume, with scarves arranged in layers and bells attached at the waist. Its demanding movements are associated particularly with young and agile dancers. Theatre scholar Stanley Timeyin Ohenhen has examined Omoko as a performance through which Itsekiri cultural identity is maintained and presented to wider audiences.

Itsekiri music, dance, textiles and masquerades share many features with the wider cultural traditions of the Niger Delta. In Curnow's account published in 2002, village umale masquerades were associated with particular water spirits, settlements, priests, shrines and sacred groves. A masquerader is covered in layers of cloth, with ankle rattles, feet coloured with camwood and a carved headpiece. Many umale masquerades strongly resemble their Ijaw counterparts. Their carved headpieces often follow Western Ijaw styles, while many also have Ijaw names and lyrics or share Ijaw dance elements. Itsekiri performers acknowledge this influence, although the accompanying singing, drumming and structured dances retain distinct Itsekiri forms.

In urban centres, new cultural societies adapted village masquerade traditions to public performance. Her study documented more than twenty such societies, many founded during the 1950s, in Warri, Sapele, Lagos and Benin City. Membership included men and women and was based on the Itsekiri affiliation of either parent, although masking and esoteric discussion of the masks remained restricted to male initiates in her fieldwork. Unlike village mask types, which were inherited and connected with particular shrines and priests, the societies selected their own repertoires and placed greater emphasis on public spectacle, aesthetic competition and innovation. They combined masks from different Itsekiri communities with new creations inspired by contemporary life.

These newer masks could turn familiar objects into imaginative performances. Plane represented the helicopters and aircraft seen around the oilfields; Jaba-Jaba transformed imported headless stockfish into fish-bodied figures with human heads; and the abstract Ogienuranran (“the king has prominence”) honoured the monarchy. Such performances brought local traditions together while projecting a shared Itsekiri identity in multiethnic cities.

=== Festivals and royal ceremonies ===
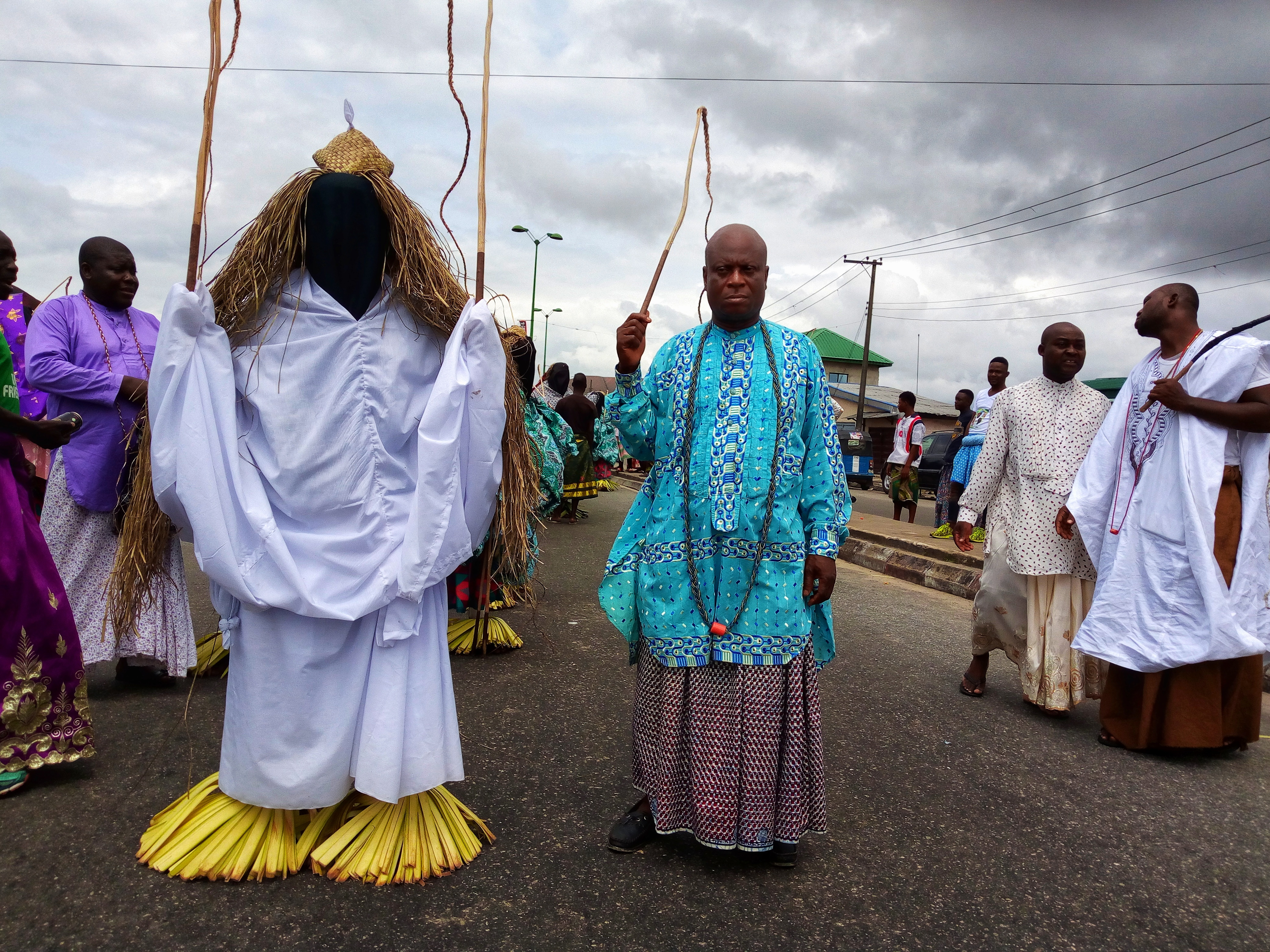
Oshogw'umale, known as the father of the Awankere masquerades

Awankere, also known as Umale Okere or Okere Juju, is an annual festival celebrated during the rainy season by the Okere community in Warri. The celebrations begin with purification rites and offerings to the deity Okiroro, followed by masquerade performances with songs and dances celebrating fertility. Oshogw'umale is known as the father of the Awankere masquerades, and Okpoye as their mother. The festival ends with a ritual race in which the masquerades symbolically carry disease and misfortune away from the community.

The Okposo festival in Ugbuwangue honours the water goddess Okposo and reflects the community's close relationship with the rivers and sea. The preparations include cleansing rites and food offerings taken by canoe to river deities, with some ceremonies timed to the tide. During the seven days of celebrations, masquerades wear headdresses depicting fish, crocodiles and other beings. Women, children and people who have not been initiated can attend the public performances, although some rites are reserved for initiates.

The annual coronation anniversary of the reigning Olu, known as Uge Oyo Ekoro, is celebrated in Warri and Ode-Itsekiri. Chiefs and other Itsekiri gather to pay homage to the Olu during the celebrations. Recent celebrations have included Christian thanksgiving services, cultural performances, lectures and Itsekiri language competitions, as well as a boat regatta from Warri to Ode-Itsekiri.

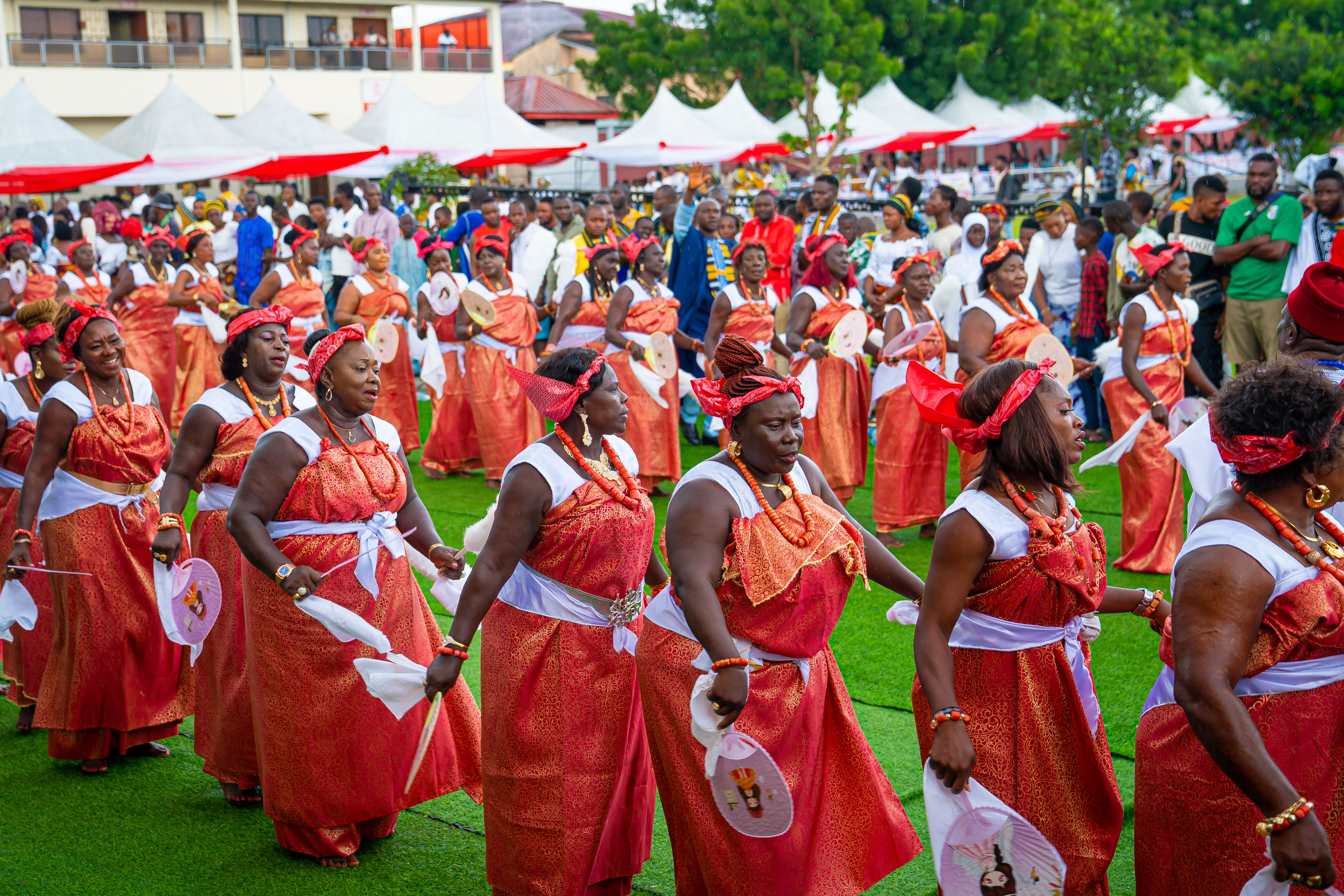
Itsekiri women dancing during a Ghigho Aghofen ceremony in 2022

In 2021, Atuwatse III introduced Ghigho Aghofen (“palace watch”), a quarterly ceremony in which Itsekiri communities take turns keeping watch over the Olu's palace for three months. The transfer of responsibility between communities is marked by homage, drumming, dance and other cultural performances.

== Religion ==
=== Traditional religion ===
Oritse is the supreme deity in traditional Itsekiri religion and is believed to have created the world. He was represented by a bamboo staff coated in white chalk. A yam was placed in its fork, and a string of cowries and either a white cloth or a white chicken were tied to it. A more recent symbol was a wooden cross draped in white cloth, placed in a compound where people offered water or coconut juice. People did not usually address prayers to Oritse, although his name was used in informal oaths. Lloyd noted that no major ceremonies appeared to be associated with Oritse.

Umale okun is the deity of the sea, and all water spirits are regarded as aspects of him.He was the principal deity at Ogheye, at the mouth of the Benin River, and was also important at Ureju. The Olu formerly presided over ceremonies for him, assisted by the Ologbotsere and the senior male patrilineal descendant of the man named Itsekiri. A small fish called ogiden was believed to be his messenger. People could pray directly to him at a creek or by spreading a white cloth before a dish of water.

Other deities included Ogun, the deity of iron and war, who was associated with the town of Ire in Ekiti. Ale aja was the earth deity, whose protection could be invoked by planting a tree when a new compound was being built. Curnow suggests that the worship of Umale okun and Ogun may have reached Warri indirectly through Benin, where the corresponding deities were worshipped as Olokun and Ogun.

Lloyd also recorded small shrines along the creeks for spirits believed to live there. They were bamboo tables holding a broken cup or dish, with offerings of kola or food left for personal safety. Each shrine belonged to an individual or a small group of people.

The umale were deified earlier inhabitants, and distinct from the ancestors remembered in family genealogies. Curnow records a tradition in which they fled into the water when Ginuwa arrived and became spirits believed to control the creeks. They were usually worshipped within individual communities, although the most important were widely revered among the Itsekiri. Lloyd wrote that each town had one or two umale associated with its founding. They were represented at annual ceremonies and other ritual occasions by masqueraders who emerged from sacred groves. Men could wear the masquerades after initiation by an umale priest.

Three umale were particularly important in Itsekiri beliefs: Ibrikimo, associated with the Olu and Orugbo; Gbasala, with the Iyatsere; and Inama, with the Ologbotsere. They sanctioned especially feared oaths, and until the mid-1930s the Itsekiri Native Courts sometimes required litigants to swear to their testimony at the shrine of Ibrikimo. Lloyd recorded that literate Itsekiri often called these umale their "policemen" and believed that they prevented wrongdoing in the community.

Ife was a commonly used form of divination among the Itsekiri. According to tradition, it was introduced by Idibien, who was said to have led Ginuwa, the founder of the Warri royal dynasty, to Ijala. It had no priesthood, and anyone could learn the practice, although some men were regarded as more skilled and consulted more frequently. Other forms of divination were also practised by laypeople.

Ancestral observances, called ebura, were organised within families and descent groups. When a man died, his eldest son was usually appointed as his priest (okpanran). He wore his father's clothes and symbols of office, including those his father had used as priest for earlier ancestors, and sat in the family shrine. The priest was expected never to have wronged the ancestors, especially by committing incest as defined by Itsekiri kinship rules. By the time of Lloyd's fieldwork, adult men were thought unlikely to meet this requirement, so a small boy was usually dressed as the priest. A daughter served as priest for a deceased woman.

Ceremonies were held annually and at other times when needed. The priest sat in an ornate chair at the centre of the shrine while relatives brought food and drink to a table before him. He offered the food to the ancestors and prayed for the health of their descendants. At the close, those present were marked on the forehead with white chalk. The skulls of sacrificed animals were often hung in or near the shrine, and participants sometimes left a handprint in the animal's blood on the shrine wall to remind the ancestors of the ceremony. Parts of the ritual were said to have been copied from the Roman Mass.

Large shrines were built for many wealthy men of the late nineteenth century. Their descendants held costly ceremonies there, competing with other descent groups through the number of dancers and drummers and the coral and silver heirlooms they displayed. In older settlements, large ceremonies were held only for village founders, though a man could also make offerings at home to his father or grandfather.

Lloyd wrote that the umale were believed to protect towns and punish offences outside the kin group, such as perjury or seduction. Ancestors were invoked over wrongs within a lineage or descent group, such as incest, breaches of food taboos and a child's refusal to acknowledge their father's lineage.

=== Christianity ===
Christianity was introduced to the Kingdom of Warri during the second half of the sixteenth century. An Augustinian mission sent from São Tomé established the Christian settlement of Santo Agostinho at the capital and baptised a royal prince as Sebastian, who had become Olu by 1597. Early Catholicism nevertheless remained concentrated at the royal court and in the capital. An episcopal report of 1620 stated that there were no Christians outside Santo Agostinho and that only a minority within the town were Catholic, with committed adherence largely confined to Olu Sebastian and his son Domingos. Repeated shortages of resident clergy caused periods in which organised Catholic practice declined.

Catholic missions returned intermittently during the seventeenth and eighteenth centuries, often at the request of successive Olus. Crosses, rosaries, processions and other Catholic symbols remained part of court life even during periods without resident priests. By the end of the eighteenth century, however, Christianity had weakened at the court and had never spread far beyond that royal centre, although it had influenced Itsekiri ritual and material culture. Catholic missionary activity lapsed during the early nineteenth century and resumed near the end of that century.

A more enduring Protestant presence developed around Warri and Sapele at the beginning of the twentieth century. In July 1901, the Anglican bishop James Johnson organised existing worshipping communities in both towns. Their earliest congregations consisted largely of Saro, Gold Coast and Yoruba migrants employed in government service, commerce and the European trading firms. Aghoghin Omatsola, an Itsekiri educated at the Hope Waddell Training Institution in Calabar, was subsequently appointed as a church agent at Sapele and helped spread Christianity into neighbouring settlements. Early Protestant missions required converts to abandon polygyny, ancestral observances, traditional festivals and participation in some chieftaincy institutions, producing tension between conversion and customary life.

Ayenbi's 2024 study describes Christianity as the predominant religion among the Itsekiri, alongside continuing traditional religious practices. Her fieldwork, conducted in 2018, found English prominent in the urban church services observed, sometimes with interpretation into Itsekiri. Some village churches and traditional rites made greater use of Itsekiri.

== Language ==
The Itsekiri language belongs to the Yoruboid group of languages. It is most closely related to southeastern varieties of Yoruba, particularly the variety spoken by the Ilaje.

Femi Akinkugbe's 1976 comparative study identified features that Itsekiri had retained but that had been lost in the Yoruba varieties examined. These included traces of an older system in which changes at the beginning of a noun distinguished singular from plural. Contact with neighbouring Edoid languages, which also use such distinctions, may have helped preserve the inherited pattern. Published descriptions report no marked regional dialects of Itsekiri, although minor differences in pronunciation and word formation have been noted.

Language contact has contributed vocabulary from Edo, Portuguese, English and other languages. Portuguese-derived examples include sangi ("blood"), garafa ("bottle") and kujere ("spoon"). English, Nigerian Pidgin and urban varieties of Yoruba are also important influences.

Written material in Itsekiri includes Bible and catechism translations, religious pamphlets, bilingual folktales and storybooks, a dictionary and language-learning handbooks. Published literature and teaching materials remain limited. A 2021 survey of Nigerian tertiary institutions found Itsekiri offered at one college of education as a National Certificate in Education programme, but not as a bachelor's degree programme.

Oti Frances Okpeyeaghan Ayenbi's doctoral study, published in 2024, drew on fieldwork conducted from January to June 2018. The participants came from varied social and occupational backgrounds, but the author cautioned that the sample did not fully represent the Itsekiri population. In the schools observed, English predominated in instruction and Nigerian Pidgin in informal interaction; Itsekiri was seldom taught. Interviews and observations also indicated reduced use of Itsekiri in some homes and limited proficiency among many younger participants.

Assessments of language vitality differ. Glottolog lists Itsekiri at level 5, "developing", on the Expanded Graded Intergenerational Disruption Scale, and labels it not endangered. Ayenbi's findings nevertheless point to difficulties in passing the language to children in the communities studied. Her research also documented its continued use in marriage, naming and funeral rites, greetings, family meetings and community associations, and its importance to speakers' sense of identity.

== Notable Itsekiri people ==
- Ogiame Atuwatse III (Current Olu of Warri Kingdom)
- Eyimofe Atake (Senior Advocate of Nigeria)
- FOM Atake, Nigerian Judge (1967–1977) and Senator of the Federal Republic of Nigeria (1979-1982)
- Ikenwoli Godfrey Emiko (Olu of Warri Kingdom)
- Nana Olomu (chief, palm oil merchant and Governor of the Benin River)
- Festus Okotie-Eboh (politician, first Nigerian finance minister)
- Arthur Prest (Nigeria's first Minister of Communications, High Court Judge and High Commissioner to the UK)
- Alfred Rewane (businessman and a financier of NADECO)
- Sunday Tuoyo (Nigerian brigadier general and military governor of Ondo State)
- Misan Sagay (screenwriter)
- Emmanuel Uduaghan (politician, governor of Delta State)
- Omawumi Megbele (musician)
- Oritse Femi (musician)
- Florence Omagbemi – Nigeria U20 female football team coach and former player for the Super Falcons.
- Pastor Ayo Oritsejafor (president of the Christian Association of Nigeria)
- Grace Alele-Williams (Professor of Mathematics, author and first female vice-chancellor of a Nigerian university).
- Amaju Pinnick (Nigeria Football Federation chairman)
- Tuedon Morgan (Nigerian marathon runner - 2 Guinness world records)
- Sam Oritsetimeyin Omatseye (Nigerian poet and novelist)
- Dudu Omagbemi (footballer Mikkelin Pallioiliajat)
- Eromo Egbejule (writer and journalist)
- Oritsejolomi Thomas (founder-provost of Lagos College of Medicine, vice-chancellor of University of Ibadan)
- Julie Coker (Miss Western Nigeria, broadcaster, and journalist)
- Tee Mac Omatshola Iseli (flutist and classical musician)
- Misan Harriman (photographer and filmmaker)
- Philip Begho (writer and playwright)
- Albert Egbe (actor and film producer)
- Amy Jadesimi (business executive and chief executive officer of LADOL)
- Oritsemeyiwa Eyesan (oil and gas executive and commission chief executive of the Nigerian Upstream Petroleum Regulatory Commission)
- Amarachi Nwosu (photographer, visual artist and filmmaker)
- Lola Maja (make-up and special-effects artist)
- Patrick Doyle (actor and broadcaster)
- Odumodublvck (rapper and songwriter)
- Tara Fela-Durotoye (entrepreneur and founder of House of Tara)
- Best Ogedegbe (footballer)
