= Deghele Community =

- Communities of Warri Kingdom
- Country: Nigeria
- State: Delta State
- LGA: Warri South-West
- Kingdom: Warri Kingdom

Government
  - Olu of Warri: Ogiame Atuwatse III
  - Local Government Chairman: Dr. Michael Tidi
- Time zone: UTC+1 (WAT)
- Postal code: 331104

Deghele Community is an indigenous Itsekiri rural community in Warri Kingdom. Princess Iye Akengbuwa founded Deghele Community for her son, Governor Chanomi. Princess Iye acted as the regent after the death of her father Olu Akengbuwa who was the last Olu of Warri before the interregnum in Warri Kingdom between 1888 and 1936. It is located in Warri South-West local government area of present-day Delta State, Nigeria.

== See also ==
- Warri
