= Tebu Community =

Tebu
- Community
- Flag
- Interactive map of Tebu
- Coordinates: 5.846017°N 5.110471°E
- Country: Nigeria
- State: Delta State
- LGA: Warri North
- Kingdom: Warri

Government
  - Olu of Warri: Ogiame Atuwatse III
  - LGA Chairman: Festus Ashima
  - House of Representatives Member: Chief Hon. Thomas Ereyitomi
- Elevation: 11 m (36 ft)
- Time zone: UTC+1 (WAT)
- Postal code: 331104

Tebu is an Itsekiri community in Warri North Local Government Area of Delta State, Nigeria. It is located in the Olero Creek area of the Benin River system and forms part of the traditional territory of the Kingdom of Warri.

It sits in the Tebu ward of Warri North and Warri federal constituency.

== Geography ==
Tebu Community is located at latitude 5.846017 and longitude 5.110471. Tebu community is 11 meters/36.09 feet above sea level. Her border communities include Jakpa, Gbokoda, Deleoketa, Aja-metan and Udo.

== See also ==
- Warri
