= Sapele, Nigeria =

LGA in Delta State, Nigeria

Sapele
- LGA
- Nicknames: Saffi, Saff Town, Saff, Sap City
- Interactive map of Sapele
- Location in Nigeria
- Coordinates: 5°54′N 5°40′E
- Country: Nigeria
- States of Nigeria: Delta State
- Local Government Area: Sapele

Government
  - Type: Executive
  - Governor: Sheriff Oborevwori
  - Local Government Chairman: Hon. Bright Abeke

Area
  - Total: 580.3 km^{2} (224.1 sq mi)
- Elevation: 10 m (33 ft)

Population (2022)
  - Total: 238,800
  - Density: 411.5/km^{2} (1,066/sq mi)
  - Ethnicities: Urhobo
  - Religions: Christianity African Traditional Religion
- Name derived from ‘Uriapele’ an indigenous Okpe deity
- Time zone: UTC+1 (WAT)
- Postal code: 331107

Sapele is a city and one of the Local Government Areas of Delta State, Nigeria.

Sapele city [səpā´lē] (2016 pop. 161,686) is a port in the Niger Delta region of Southern Nigeria along the Ethiope River in western Delta State. Sapele has its headquarters located in Sapele town. The main town is located 68 km south of Benin City and is connected to Warri and Benin by the A2 federal highway. The center of the Nigerian timber industry, Sapele houses sawmills and a large plywood and veneer factory where rubber is processed. The city also houses industry for the manufacture of plastics, chemicals, and shoes. The Sapele Township Stadium was completed in 2013. It has a seating capacity of 10,000 visitors. This LGA has a total population of 174,273 as at the 2006 census.

After the British established a vice consulate in the city in 1892, Sapele grew in importance as a port; in 1894 it came under British rule and served as a local administrative center.

The Okpe people believe the origin of the name is to be an anglicized derivation of the Okpe word 'Uriapele', named after a local deity, the shrine of which can still be found in the centre of the city. The British colonial officials changed the name of the then hamlet to Sapele.

Sapele city seats on the indigenous lands of the Okpe people, a major group of the Urhobo Nation whose language Okpe is one of the Edoid tribes of southern Nigeria. The town also houses a number of other groups, many of whom migrated due to the growing industry. Today, the town has grown into an urban area unofficially incorporating the townships and villages of Amukpe, Oviri, Okuovwori and Jesse (Akpobome, Mosogar, Ajititor, Mosagon & Michaga).

== History ==
By the mid-19th century, Sapele was established as a trading centre, occasionally visited by Europeans. In 1891, the British government established a vice-consulate at Sapele. The population grew to 33,638 by 1952, because of the cosmopolitan nature of the town and its employment opportunities. People from many Nigerian ethnic groups have settled there, alongside the many Okpe people, these also include the Itsekiris and ijaws, as well as the Urhobo people from surrounding towns and villages.

In August 1891, the British Government established a Consular Administration over the Oil Rivers Protectorate, later, the Niger Coast Protectorate. The administration, consisting of six consular river districts, was under Major (later Sir) Claude M. Macdonald. He was the Commissioner and Consul-General and his headquarters was at Calabar. Two of the river districts were located at Benin River and Forcados River. Shortly after its establishment, the Forcados River District was removed to Warri trading station which is now the Warri Township. It is with the Benin River District that we are concerned here. The first Deputy Commissioner and Vice-Consul in charge of the Benin River District was Captain H. L. Gallwey. The District Office was at the mouth of Benin River, 8 kilometres (5 mi) from the sea coast. The jurisdiction of the Vice-Consul covered the whole of the Benin country and included the south-western part of the Itsekiri country and the north-western part of the Urhobo country particularly along the Ethiope River.

About two months after the establishment of the Protectorate Government, Gallwey was given an important duty to carry out. One of the first assignments to Gallwey was the survey in October 1891, of the Urhobo Oil markets along the Ethiope River.

On 27 October 1891 accompanied by Mr. S. Munro of the African Association, Gallwey proceeded on the voyage for the survey in a launch hired from Messrs. Bey and Zimmer, a German trading firm at Benin River. The following part of his report is pertinent:

General Account of the Visit in Diary Form

October 27: Left Consulate at 10 a.m. reached Sapele 6 p.m. anchored for the night-roughly 55 miles [89 km] from Consulate and 60 miles [97 km] from the mouth of the river.

The anchorage here is deep and roomy, and the ground high, though one mass of forest. A most suitable spot to establish factories especially as all the produce from the Sobo markets passes here on the way to the towns near the mouth of the river.

I consider Sapele to be a very good place to establish a Vice-Consulate, constabulary barracks, etc.

"A great deal of clearing would be necessary to prepare the site, but this would afford work to the natives, and consequently be beneficial to some one.

By means of a launch all the markets could be reached in a very short time; a launch drawing 6 feet of water could go about 3 miles [5 km] past Eku.

The river water at Sapele is fresh, and one is well clear of the mangrove and fever swamps of the coast.

Steamers drawing 14 to 15 feet of water could run up to Sapele.

These steamers could tranship cargo to and from the larger steamers in the Forcados River.

October 28: Up anchor at 6 a.m. Half a mile [800 m] after leaving Sapele I left the main stream and went almost due east up a side creek (or river?). Sapele is the first Sobo market, and from there each bank is dotted at intervals with the oil markets, the few houses on the river-side being a sort of depot where the middlemen live and buy oil as it is brought from inland by the Sobo men. Reached Acpara at 4:30 p.m.

Major Claude Maxwell Macdonald, the Commissioner and Consul-General visited Sapele on 14 November 1891, and approved the site as being eminently suitable. In his Despatch No. 30 the Foreign Office, dated 12 December 1891, the Major said "I consider the Sapoli would be a very good situation for the establishment of a constabulary station; the ground is high, and though covered with forest, could be easily cleared. The people of Sapoli informed me that if I would come and build there, they would clear as much ground as I wished." That was the historic decision that made Sapele the modern township it came to be in later years.

The Government did not however wait for the work on the site of the proposed Sapele constabulary station to be completed before establishing there. The matter was urgent, and a temporary facility had to be put in place. A ship named the Hindustan bought at Bristol was sailed to Benin River. There it was dismantled, fitted up as a hulk, and towed to the Sapele anchorage. The hulk was said to have provided excellent accommodation for four Europeans, a Customs Office, a Consular Court, a Treasury, a Prison and Barracks for civil police.

While the machinery of Government began in the hulk, the excellent site opposite the anchorage was being cleared for the construction of barracks to accommodate sixty men and a detachment of Protectorate troops under a British Officer. That was in 1892. To live and work in a hulk might be an innovation at Sapele, but the idea was certainly not a new one to Europeans, especially European traders in the Oil Rivers. By its strategic location, Sapele, like Degema was considered to be an important military and administrative station for the projection of power and authority.

Details about the settlement of the Government at Sapele for the next two years are yet unknown and await further research. It is known however that by July 1894, a Medical Department had been established. It is also known that by 1895, the Sapele Vice-Consulate had already been sufficiently established as to warrant the closing down of the Vice-Consulate at Benin River. Thereafter, the Benin River Office was used as a Customs post until 27 October 1905, when the post was removed to Koko Town.

Today, the town has one of Nigeria's major ports and its river is also non-salty. Its industries include the processing of timber, rubber, and palm oil, as well as furniture, tamarind balm and footwear manufacturing. Sapele also is a hub for oil and gas exploration, with flow stations situated in Shell Road and Oton. It has various oil wells in neighboring towns and villages like Ugborhen, Ugbukurusu, Amukpe, Okirigwe and Oton under Sapele's local Government. Its population was 135,800 in 1995, growing to 242,652 by 2005/6.

The surrounding forest especially features Entandrophragma cylindricum, commonly called Sapele after the town. This Nigerian hardwood has long been in high demand internationally, for multiple uses ranging from guitars to sea defences. Sapele was one of Africa's largest timber producers, alongside a smaller UAC establishment in Ghana. It was frequented by many international shipping companies, such as Elder Dempster. The African Timber and Plywood (AT&P), a Sapele factory from a division of the United Africa Company, UAC, was once reputed to be the largest timber manufacturing complex in the world. In its prime, notably during the 1960s and '70s, it was the town's greatest employer with an estimated 9,000 employees, many of them working in tropical forestry regions supplying the Sapele factory via rafts on the abundant river systems. The forestry business was carefully managed by the United Africa Company to avoid deforestation and preserve timber resources. As well as the export of African hardwoods, AT&P Ltd in Sapele was also famous for the manufacture of many related items: plywood, chipboard (and associated glue products), housing components, prefabricated houses for the army and others, furniture etc. It trained skilled engineers and managers, some of whom were sent to the United Kingdom and Germany for training purposes. It contributed much to the growing infrastructure of the town, such as sports centres/the Sapele Athletic Club, schools, roads, housing, shops, and health provision. The company also had its own health clinic or small hospital from which its workers benefitted.

The Ogorode district of the city houses two of the Power Holding Company of Nigeria power generation plants, one of six majors in the country and the nation's second largest with an installed capacity of 1,000 MW (1,300,000 hp) as well as an NIPP power plant.

== Climate ==
The climate is oppressive year-round in Sapele, with the wet season being warm and cloudy and the dry season being hot and partially cloudy.

== Notable people ==
- David Dafinone, accountant and politician
- Peter Dedevbo, Nigerian U20- Women's National team Head Coach
- David Defiagbon, Olympic boxing silver medalist
- Olusoji Fasuba, sprinter
- Kefee, gospel singer and composer
- Endurance Ojokolo, athlete
- Blessing Okagbare, athlete
- Ola Rotimi, playwright
