= Omawumi Udoh =

Nigerian politician

Beatrice Omawumi Udoh

State Representative
- In office 2003–2016
- Constituency: Warri South I

Personal details
- Born: June 2, 1960
- Died: December 15, 2016 (aged 56)
- Occupation: Politician

Beatrice Omawumi Udoh (born June 2, 1960) was a Nigerian politician who served as the Speaker of the Delta House of Assembly, representing the Warri South I constituency from 2003 until her death. She died on December 15, 2016.
