= Okere, Warri =

Community in Delta State, Nigeria

Okere
- Community of Warri Kingdom
- Nickname: Okere juju
- Country: Nigeria
- State: Delta State
- LGA: Warri South
- Kingdom: Kingdom Of Warri

Government
  - Body: Warri South
  - Olu of Warri: Ogiame Atuwatse III
  - Council Chairman: Michael Tidi
  - Community head: Ogieboro E. F. Esisi
  - Chief Priest (Ojorumale): Oluoyibo Kperegbeyi
- Website: www.warrikingdom.org

Okere is a community in the Warri township in Nigeria. It is populated by Itsekiri people and is one of the oldest communities in Warri, as well as a part of the Kingdom of Warri.

== History ==
Okere literally means ”it is small” in Itsekiri. It is an Itsekiri indigenous community and is the oldest in the modern-day Warri metropolis, having been founded in 1497 by a Benin war general, Ekpenede. At the time, the Oba had (in secret) sent his son Ginuwa to establish a new kingdom (today known as the Kingdom of Warri). Ekpenede and his men pursued Ginuwa, but when they were cut off by the Warri River with no way to cross, they established a community upland, which they named "Okere". Ekpenede is said to have planted his staff at the centre of the settlement, proclaiming "Ogungbaja Okere" (translated as "war will never come to Okere"). The staff reportedly grew into a tree which stands as a major historical landmark near the Okere market junction.
