= Tuedon Morgan =

Nigerian ultramaraton runner

Tee Morgan
- Tee holding the Nigerian flag after completing her North Pole Marathon

Personal information
- Full name: Tuedon "Tee" Omatsola-Morgan
- Nationality: Nigerian; British
- Born: 3 April 1973 (age 53) Warri, Nigeria
- Updated on 28 November 2016

Tuedon "Tee" Omatsola-Morgan, born 3 April 1973 is a Nigerian ultramaraton runner. She has completed in over 73 marathons and has competed in 2 ultramarathons.

== Early life ==
Born in Warri, Nigeria, she was born into the Itsekiri tribe. Morgan moved to the UK at the age of 16 to pursue her studies.

== Career ==
One of the most decorated female Nigerian marathon runners of her time she has won many accolades such as 2 Guinness world records which have been held for almost 2 years. She has completed Marathons and Half Marathons on Antarctica and a Marathon on the North pole. She is the first Nigerian woman to complete a marathon on the North Pole. Morgan is the World Record holder of 2 different world records : fastest time for a woman to run a half marathon on each continent (10 days, 23 hours and 37 minutes) and fastest time for a woman to run a half marathon on each continent and the north pole (62 days, 12 hours, 58 minutes and 49 seconds). The former of the two records was done as part of Morgan's Triple 7 challenge where she attempted to run 7 half marathons on 7 continents in 7 days but due to adverse weather conditions when attempting to land in Antarctica for the last marathons she was unable to complete it in 7 days but the 10 days she was credited for in the world record.
