= Nana Olomu =

Nigerian Itsekiri chief and palm oil merchant

- Born: 1852
- Died: 1916 (aged 63–64)
- Occupations: Itsekiri chief, merchant
- Known for: Fighting against Colonial Nigeria

Nana Olomu (also spelled Olumu) (1852–1916) was an Itsekiri chief and palm oil merchant from the Niger Delta region of southern Nigeria. He was the fourth Itsekiri chief to hold the position of Governor of Benin River.

== Background to conflict with the British ==
In 1851, the British Consul for the Bights of Benin and Biafra, John Beecroft, established the post of Governor of Benin River and gave it to an Itsekiri chief, Idiare. The governorship was intended to pass back and forth between two prominent Itsekiri families, the Emaye and the Ologbotsere. However, upon the death of his father, an Ologbotsere, the governorship was passed directly to Nana Olomu, instead of one of the Emaye.

In 1884, Nana Olomu, the fourth Governor of Benin River, signed a treaty on behalf of the Itsekiri, granting the British further rights in Itsekiriland. The relations between the two were peaceful until the Berlin Conference of 1884-85 and the ensuing Scramble for Africa, which led the British to try to bypass the Itsekiri middlemen so as to trade directly with the Urhobo people. A further complication was that because of technical improvements in shipping, European traders could travel further into the interior than previously, ending their former reliance on the coastal chieftains as middlemen.

== Attacks on the Urhobo ==
Nana Olomu with his wives and some children with Sir Walter Egerton, Governor of Southern Nigeria from 1906 to 1912 at a village on the Benin River.

Following this development the relations between the Itsekiri, led by Olomu, and the British began to decline. In 1892 and 1893, direct treaties between the British and the Urhobo further angered Olomu. In retaliation for the perceived bypassing of the Itsekiri, Olomu's men attacked some of the nearby Urhobo villages which had been exchanging goods with the British. This led to the Urhobo halting their trading, and the British responded by cracking down on the Itsekiri. In 1894, several other Itsekiri chiefs signed a new treaty with the British. The British razed Brohemie to the ground, and attacked several other towns in the area, and Olomu's wealth was seized. He was captured and found guilty of acts including crucifixions. He was then deported to the Gold Coast.

In the United Kingdom in 1899, the Aborigines' Protection Society complained to the Foreign Office about "the arbitrary treatment" to which the chief had been subjected, the government's failure to carry out "the searching investigation of his case which he had always sought", and appealed for him to be given liberty to conduct his commercial affairs freely even if, for political reasons, he could not be restored to his old position. A letter from Olomu was also enclosed complaining his maintenance was inadequate for him to support himself and five other persons. In his reply the then Prime Minister the Marquis of Salisbury promised to look into the conditions of the chief's maintenance, but ruled out the possibility of a return to his homeland. A month later the question of his treatment was raised in parliament and the government again stated it would be unsafe to allow his return.

== Museum ==
Olomu's palace has been converted into a museum, the Nana Living History Museum, which chronicles his interactions with the British. It is located in Koko, Delta State.
