= Tee Mac Omatshola Iseli =

Nigerian flautist (born 1948)

Tee Mac MFR
- Also known as: Tee Mac
- Born: Tee Mac Omatshola Iseli; 17 May 1948 (age 77)
- Genres: Classical, pop
- Occupation: Flautist
- Instrument: Flute
- Website: teemaciseli.com

Tee Mac Omatshola Iseli MFR (born 17 May 1948) is a Nigerian flautist, with cross-cultural Itsekiri and Swiss roots.

== Career ==
Omatshola combined his first degree in economics from the University of St. Gallen in Switzerland, with a specialization in classical music concert performance and philharmonic composition of the University of Lausanne. During a rich career spanning over 40 years, Omatshola formed numerous bands, including Tee Mac & Afro Collection in the 1970s.

He recorded his first LP, United, with Polydor International in Germany with his European band Tee Mac United, in the late seventies.

He worked with celebrated Welsh-Nigerian singer Shirley Bassey as her musical arranger and conductor and also worked as a composer for Cidi Croft Enterprise and later for Universal Films in Hollywood, Los Angeles. Even though Omatshola spent a lot of time touring across the globe (Far East, Latin America, Europe, North America and South Africa), he always invested in local Nigerian initiatives, becoming one of the pioneers of the Classical Music Society of Nigeria, which eventually founded the Muson Centre, Nigeria’s leading music school.

In 2007 Omatshola was elected president of the Musician Union of Nigeria PMAN, investing time and energy into helping develop the Nigerian entertainment industry. In 2009 he was appointed the Nigerian director of the Motherland Group, (initiated by Michael Jackson’s brother, Marlon, of The Jackson 5) which is getting support from the Lagos State Government to build a historical slave museum in Badagry. In 2011 he was elected chairman of FAMECorp, owned by top Nigerian Musicians and Nollywood stars, to build cinema houses and concert halls all over Nigeria.

Omatshola was awarded the Member of the Federal Republic (MFR) national honour by Nigeria’s President Yar’adua in 2009 for his vital role in brokering peace with the Niger Delta militants and fighting for their rehabilitation. In 2011 he received an honorary doctorate degree in Arts from Bradley University in Illinois, where he serves as chairman of the board of trustees, and teaches philharmonic composition as visiting associate professor.

Omatshola invested into solid minerals (he is the chairman of Allied Minerals Ltd., Cass-Cotan Mining and Processing Ltd.) He is chairman of Tee Mac Petroleum (Nig) Ltd., chairman of Tee Mac Productions (owns a recording studio), chairman of the board of the Tee Mac-HEMLA Foundation (to build music schools for the underprivileged youths of Nigeria), chairman of ACC (Anti Counterfeiting Collaboration, an association of Trade Mark owners), chairman of The Entertainment Foundation of Nigeria, umbrella of all the entertainment associations of Nigeria, music and films; director in Hemla-Ogoni Resources Ltd., director in D&H Energy Nig. Ltd. and the West African representative of Daewoo and Hemla (Norway) gas and oil solutions and executive director and shareholder in James Bay Energy Nig. Ltd.

== Personal life ==
Omatshola has three sons Victor, Joseph and Kingsley.

Two years after the demise of T.B. Joshua, Omatshola was said to have credited the late Joshua with teaching him "to stay humble, give and believe in God and in the Lord Jesus".

== Discography ==
=== Albums ===
- United (1973)
- Save Me (1974)
- Party Fever (1977)
- Mixed Grill (1979)
- Night Illusion (1983)
- Blind Date (1985)
- The Lesser known Flute Composers (classical, 1989)
- The Quanz Flute Concertos (1991)
- Slightly Sinful (pop, 1999)
- Just Like a Dream (2007)
- The City of Mer Kailash (ballet, 2009)

=== New works ===
- The Synagogue of all Nations Symphony
- The Biafra Symphony
- 2 Flute Concerto for extended Philharmonic Orchestras.
