= Amarachi Nwosu =

Nigerian-American photographer, visual artist, filmmaker, writer and speaker

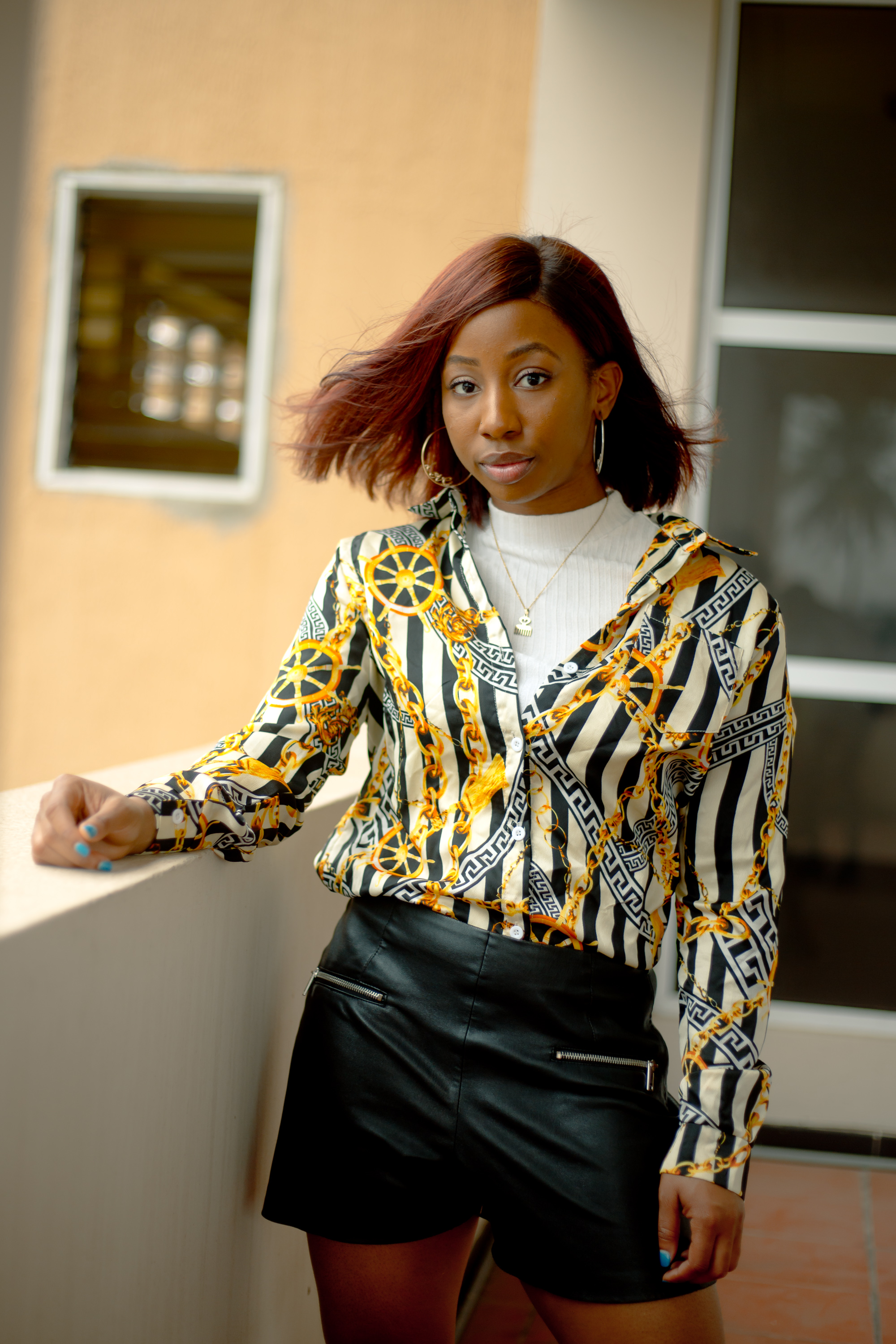
- Born: 29 September 1994 (age 31); Washington, D.C., U.S.
- Education: Temple University
- Occupations: Photographer, film maker
- Works: Black in Tokyo
- Website: www.amarachinwosu.com

Amarachi Nwosu (Igbo pronunciation; born 29 September 1994) , is a Nigerian-American photographer, visual artist, and filmmaker currently based in New York City. She is also the founder of Melanin Unscripted, a creative platform and agency which aims to dismantle stereotypes and blur cultural lines by exposing complex identities and cultures around the world. Her debut documentary "Black in Tokyo" premiered at the International Center of Photography at the ICP Museum in New York City in 2017. She also screened the film in Tokyo, Japan at Ultra Super New Gallery in Harajuku.

== Personal life ==
Born to Nigerian Igbo parents, Itsekiri and Ghanaian heritage, Nwosu grew up in Washington D.C. and lived some of her early years in Port Harcourt, Nigeria and New York City.

Nwosu went to school at Temple University in Philadelphia but moved to Tokyo during her junior year after winning six scholarships to study a year abroad as an international student, where she pursued a degree in International Communications. She finished her degree in the US and returned to Tokyo to learn Japanese and work as a full-time creative, where she was part of the launch of Highsnobiety in Japan and worked with clients like Beats and Sony Music Japan.

== Career ==
She shot a fashion story, ‘Sankofa’ at the Cape Coast Castle in Ghana for Vogue. Activist Malala Yousafzai, commissioned her to document her visit to Tokyo in 2019. Other powerful figures she's shadowed and shot include supermodel Naomi Campbell during her trip to Lagos, Nigeria and Ebonee Davi.s She has also directed short films on the power of women in sports for companies like Nike in Nigeria.

Nwosu has been involved in pushing the Afrobeats and afrofusion sound as a visual artist, music journalist, creative director and brand manager. She has worked with artists like Mr Eazi, Yxng Bane, Nonso Amadi, Odunsi The Engine, Santi, Kwesi Arthur and Tobi Lou. She also worked as the tour photographer for Childish Gambino during his 2018 ‘This is America’ tour.

In 2018, she directed the launch of Budweiser in Nigeria through their Budx platform by curating the homecoming exhibition for Nigerian-American Hip Hop documentarian Chi Modu within her Melanin Unscripted platform as a way to bridge the golden era of Hip Hop in America and the current space of Hip Hop in Nigeria. The event was a two-day exhibition, workshop, panel, concert and party.

She has also bridged music and youth culture in Japan, where she shot the first feature for The Fader highlighting the contemporary music scene in Tokyo and the first African woman to appear on Adidas Tokyo's Instagram page as a way to highlight diversity in Japan.

== Social media and advocacy ==
In 2017, Nwosu tweeted about the plagiarism and cultural appropriation of African prints by British designer Stella McCartney during its showcase at Paris Fashion Week, sparking an outrage on the social media platform. OkayAfrica called it "Cultural Colonialism" and in a viral tweet, she bemoaned the use of African designs by the brand "but using only one African model on her runway".

Despite backlash, McCartney failed to apologize and issued a statement to Fashionista that gave credit to textile brand Vlisco in the Netherlands rather than indigenous African women.

“The prints were about celebrating a unique textile craftsmanship, its culture and highlighting its heritage. We designed the prints in collaboration with Vlisco in the Netherlands, the company that has been creating unique Real Dutch Wax fabrics in Holland since 1846 and helps maintain its heritage." it wrote.

== Notable mentions ==
- OkayAfrica named Nwosu in their 2019 100 Women campaign to celebrate Women's History Month.
