= Benin River =

River in Nigeria

Coordinates: 5°49′54.7″N 5°9′11.3″E

Benin river
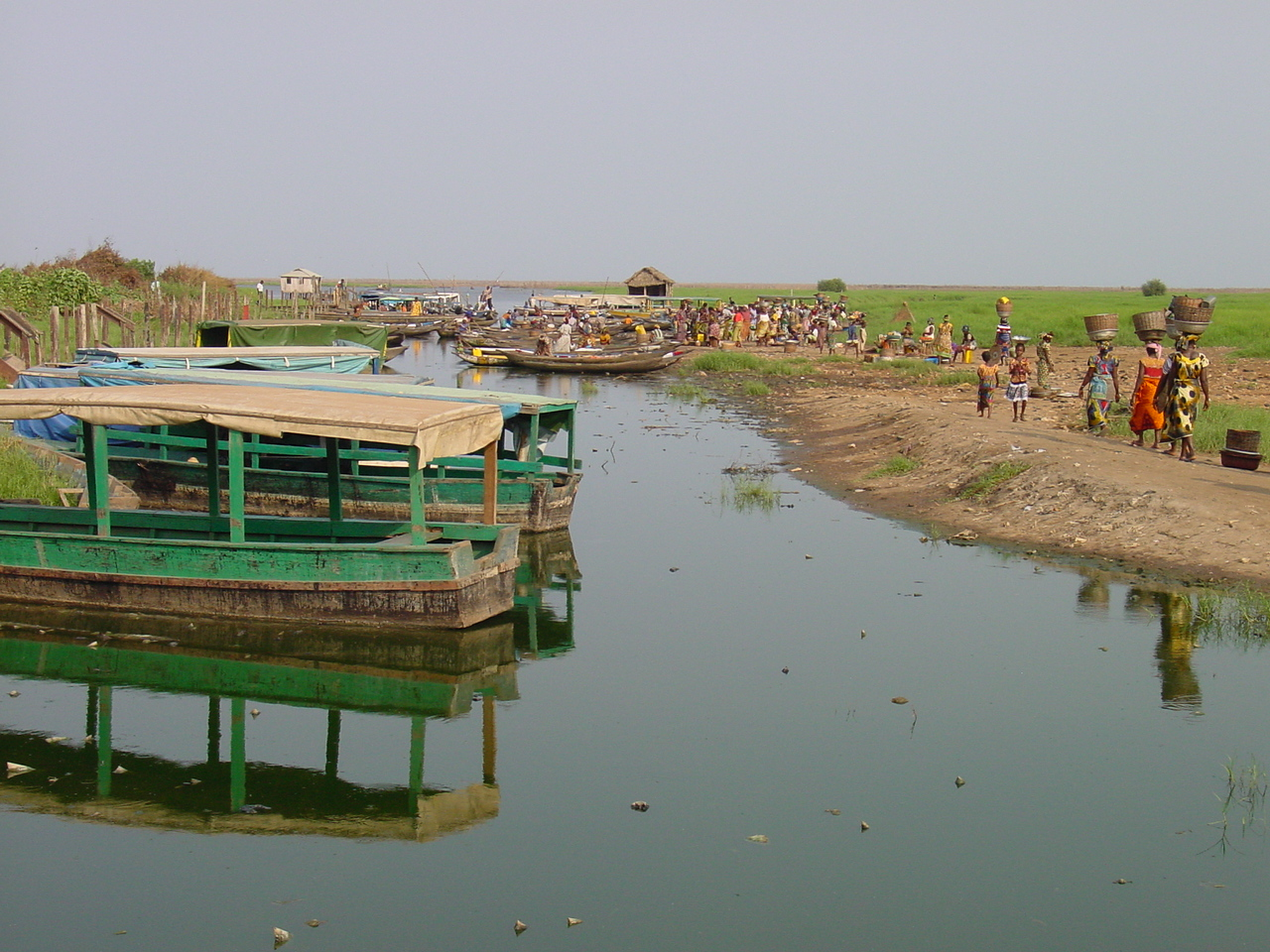

Location
- Country: Nigeria
- State: Delta state, Edo state.

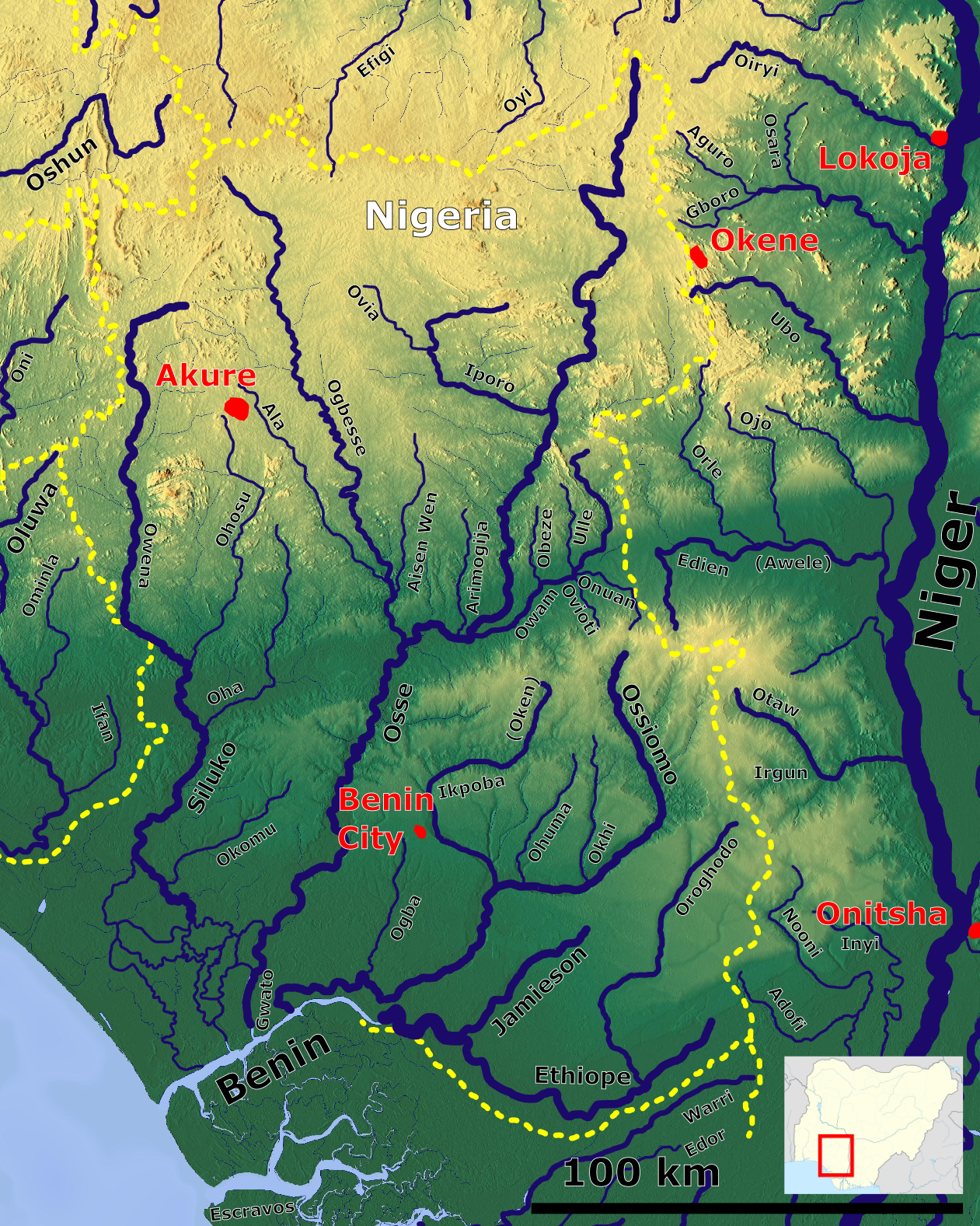
Benin river Basin

The Benin River is a river that flows through the south west of Nigeria.

The river starts under the name "Ethiope" in the south east of the state, Edo. Subsequently, it runs through various cities and villages, such as Umutu, Owah Abbi, Obiaruku, Abraka, Igun Watershed, Idjerhe Kingdom, Sapele, Mosogar and Koko. Near Sapele the Ethiope continues into the Benin. From here on the river widens into a small estuary and discharges into the Gulf of Guinea.

The Benin is partly a branch of the Niger, as the two rivers are connected through a few streams.

The river is also the hub of various commercial activities including a collection point for palm oil and kernels and timber. Another activity around the river and its port include fishing, which includes the harvesting of crayfish and shrimps. The river is also used for transportation since it is wide and deep, while the adjoining land is used for cultivation of arable and commercial crops.

== Climate/Weather ==
The Benin river has two to three seasons the dry and hot season, from January to April it is very hot and dry, while in May to July and September is raining season. The North part of the river has an extreme temperature, very hot and dry different from the southern side of the river.

== Pollution ==
A recent study conducted by WHO revealed the primary cause of water pollution in the City of Benin. These are consolidated impacts of rainfall and construction development work carried out in the area, as well as a lack of plumbing codes.

When Benin City experiences high pour of rain and flooding, water under flood tension enters the lines through breaks, inappropriately fixed joints and harmed pipes. The lack of plumbing codes or absence of such codes was likewise distinguished as one more reason for the water pollution in Benin City,

== Recent development ==
The government of Edo state, under the leadership of Godwin Obaseki, have take a move to hasten and complete the proposed Port project that is on going in the Benin river. This project is fast track in order to improve the state Revenue in terms of many ways and transporting raw materials in and outside the state. this project is a collaboration of Federal Ministry of Transportation, Nigerian Ports Authority and Edo state government and the transaction adviser CPCS Transcom of Canada.

The Port of Antwerp International has also collaborated with Edo state government to make the project easy and fast to complete and in other ways to see the Benin Port become both a cargo handling port and an industrial complex to enhance industrial production and promotion in Edo state.
