= Warri North =

- LGA
- Interactive map of Warri North
- Country: Nigeria
- State: Delta State
- Headquarters: Koko

Government
  - Local Government Chairman and the Head of the Local Government Council: Hon. Festus Anirejuoritse Ashima

Area
  - Total: 1,841 km^{2} (711 sq mi)

Population (2006)
  - Total: 136,149
  - Density: 73.95/km^{2} (191.5/sq mi)
- Time zone: UTC+1 (WAT)
- Postal code: 332

Warri North is a Local Government Area of Delta State, Nigeria. Its headquarters is in the town of Koko. It has an area of 1,841 km^{2} and a population of 136,149 at the 2006 census. The postal code of the area is 332.

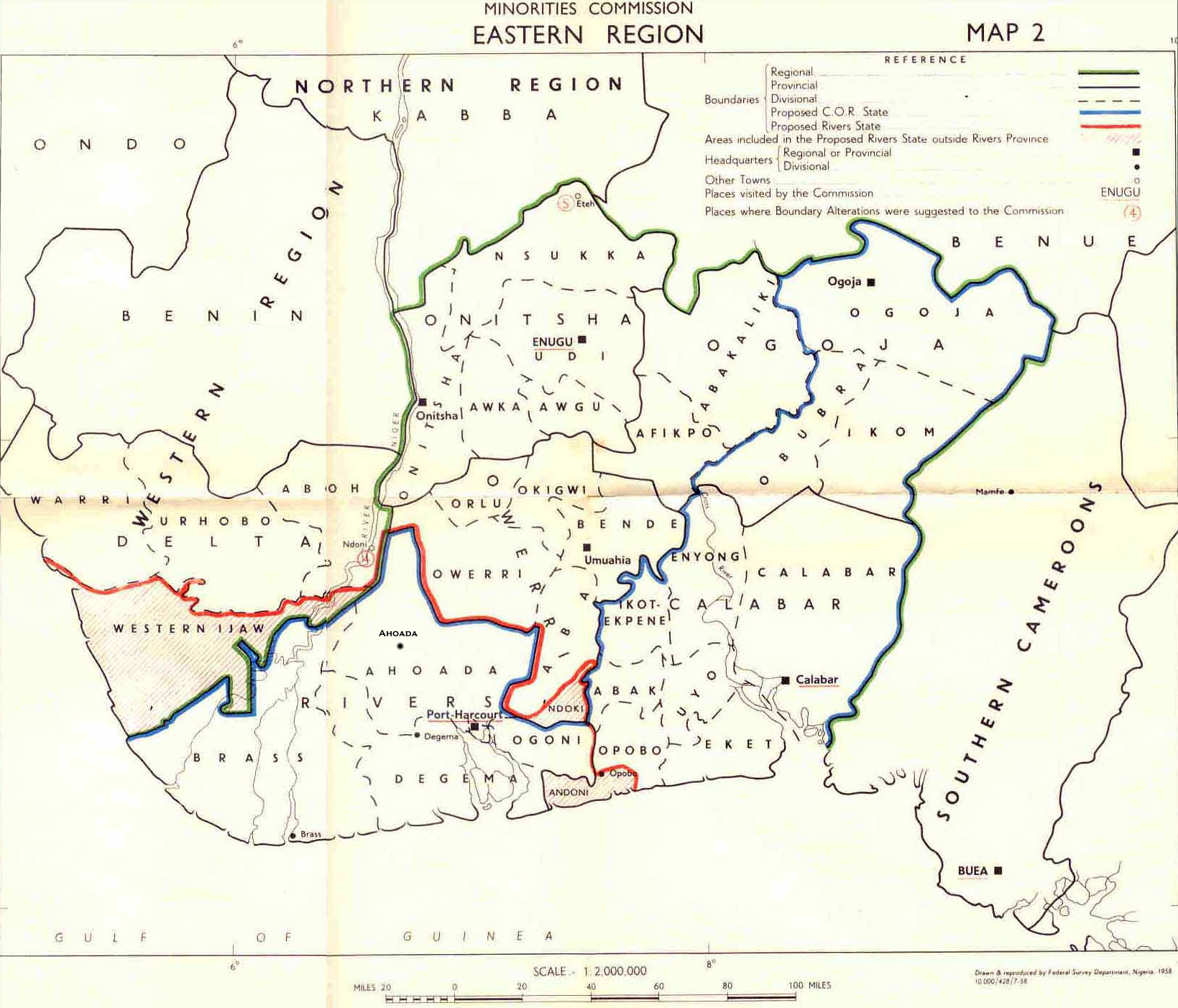
The British Map of Eastern Nigeria, 1958

Warri North has its headquarters at Koko, a town that houses a sea port. Koko also contains the house of Nana Olomu of Itsekiri. The area is predominantly riverine and is inhabited by the Itsekiri people. The major occupations of the people are fishing, carving of canoes, net weaving, hunting, clothes dyeing, trading and farming. The floating market at Ogheye is a local tourist attraction. The LGA contains crude oil facilities, operated by the Nigeria National Petroleum Company, Chevron, among others.

== See also ==
- Warri
