= Sam Omatseye =

Nigerian writer

- Born: Samuel Oritsetimeyin Omatseye; 15 June 1961 (age 65)
- Education: University of Ife
- Occupations: writer; journalist; poet; playwright
- Writing career
- Notable awards: National Productivity Order of Merit (2019)

Samuel Oritsetimeyin Omatseye (born June 15, 1961) is a Nigerian poet, novelist, playwright and journalist. Sam Omatseye hails from Delta State, Nigeria. He is a 2019 recipient of the National Productivity Order of Merit (NPOM).

== Education ==
Sam Omatseye attended Government College, Ughelli, (former Bendel State), Delta State, from 1973 to 1979 for his secondary school education and obtained the School West African School Certificate. He attended the Federal School of Arts and Science, Victoria Island, Lagos, for his higher school education. He studied history at the University of Ife (now Obafemi Awolowo University) from 1980 to 1985 and obtained a Bachelor of Arts degree.

== Career ==
He taught English and literature at the Aminu Kano Commercial College, Kano, during his National Youth Service from 1985 to 1986. Between 1987 and 1988 he worked as a reporter-researcher at Newswatch magazine, and covered a variety of beats from foreign affairs to culture.

In 1988 he had a stint as a staff writer with the African Concord magazine, and anchored stories about tyrannies and turbulence that characterised the Babangida years. He later became the deputy political editor of Concord newspapers in 1989 with specific assignment to help lead the coverage of the rigmarole of the political transition programme of the Babangida years. In 1990 he was selected by the United States Information Service to cover the off-year elections, and worked for six weeks in the country, including an attachment with the Kansas City Star in Missouri. Sam Omatseye was appointed managing editor of the Abuja Bureau of Concord newspapers in 1993.

Sam served as the editorial page editor of ThisDay newspaper in 1995. He became deputy editor of Sunday Concord in 1996 after the Concord Newspaper Group was unbanned.

Between 1998 and 2006 Sam taught media and journalism at the Metropolitan State College of Denver. He also taught classes and gave talks at the University of Colorado and the University of Denver. He became a technology journalist covering the wireless world in its bursting beginnings with RCR Wireless News.

From 2006 to the present, he has been chairman of the editorial board of The Nation Newspapers. He oversees the opinion section of the newspaper and runs a weekly column, In Touch. He has given talks several times in Nigerian universities, including Obafemi Awolowo University, University of Ibadan, and University of Lagos.

Sam was appointed a member of the Governing Council of the Lagos State University. He has also been a frequent commentator on television and radio shows on contemporary Nigerian issues. He hosted a television show, Standpoint, on TVC and currently hosts The Platform, an edgy political programme that airs every Saturday on TVC.

== Awards ==
Sam Omatseye won the Nigerian Media Merit Award in 1991 as Best Reporter for coverage of the military air crash in Ejigbo, Lagos, after he was beaten by soldiers for daring to go through military cordon to capture the visual horror and drama of the tragedy.

In 1992 he was the first ever winner of the Gordon N. Fisher Fellowship for Journalists in The Commonwealth, and was in a full academic year at the University of Toronto.

In 1997 he won the Alfred Friendly Press Fellowship, under the terms, he worked as a journalist with the Rocky Mountain News, he was not able to return to Nigeria because of the threats during the Abacha Years.

He won the Association of Black Journalists Award for Feature Writing. He also co-won the prestigious Scripps Award Prize for Deadline Reporting. He was a finalist for The Denver Press Club Prize.

He has won the Nigerian Media Merit Award (NMMA) for Columnist of The Year three times and was finalist also three times, he also won the NMMA for best reporter. He has won the Diamond Award for Media Excellence (DAME) four times for Informed Commentary. In 2011, he became the first to win both NMMA and DAME the same year.

He was made an Honorary Fellow of the Nigerian Academy Of Letters in 2015. In July 2019, Omatseye was named a Paul Harris Fellow by the Rotary Club International, the award was conferred on him by the District Governor of Rotary Club, Gbagada, Lagos, Kola Sodipo.

In November 2019, he received a national award, the National Productivity Order of Merit (NPOM). According to the letter informing Omatseye of the award signed by Labour and Employment Minister Dr. Chris Ngige, “The President of the Federal Republic of Nigeria, Muhammadu Buhari GCFR has approved the conferment of the National Productivity Order of Merit Award on you in recognition of your high productivity, hard work and excellence.”

== Books ==
Essays

- Beating All Odds: Diaries and Essays on How Bola Tinubu Became President

Columns

- In Touch, Journalism as National Narrative
- A Chronicle Foretold.

Novels

- Crocodile Girl
- My Name Is Okoro

Poems

- Mandela's Bones and Other Poems
- Dear Baby Ramatu
- Lion Wind and Other Poems
- Scented Offal

Plays

- The Siege to mark Professor Wole Soyinka's 80th birthday

== Criticisms ==
He generated nationwide criticisms with his column, In Touch, when he wrote on sensitive issues such as the legacy of the late Chief Obafemi Awolowo, erstwhile premier of the Western Nigeria; the Nigerian Civil War role of the late Biafran leader, Chief Emeka Odumegwu Ojukwu; the literary accomplishments of the late Chinua Achebe, rebutting a statement by Orji Uzor Kalu, Chairman of The Sun and New Telegraph and the incessant Southern Kaduna crisis in Nigeria
