= Tidi Michael =

Jio, Airtel, Vi Prepare for 5G Rollout; 13 Cities to Get Services in first Phase

- Born: Michael Ejueyitsi Tidi; 15 September 1980 (age 45)
- Occupation: Politician
- Political party: Peoples Democratic Party

Michael Ejueyitsi Tidi (born 15 September 1980) is a Nigerian politician who serves as the 15th chairman of Warri South Local Government Area in Delta State. He was elected on the platform of the Peoples Democratic Party.

== Early life and education ==
Tidi was born to Joshua Oritsetimeyin Tidi and Princess Roli Lizzy Emiko. He is of Itsekiri descent from Okere, Ode-Itsekiri and Omadino, and of Urhobo descent from Ukpokiti and Igbudu of Agbarah, all in present-day Warri South Local Government Area of Delta State. He attended Ikengbuwa Primary School, Warri. He proceeded to Yonwuren College, Warri, for junior secondary education and Brisco Commercial College, Warri, for senior secondary education. He obtained a bachelor's degree in economics from the University of Port Harcourt, and a master's degree in economics from Delta State University. He later earned a PhD in energy studies, specialising in oil and gas economic, at the Centre for Petroleum, Energy, Economics and Law (CPEEL), University of Ibadan.

== Career ==
After completing his National Youth Service Corps in 2006, Tidi joined the "Project Deliver Uduaghan" campaign, which supported the candidacy of Emmanuel Uduaghan for governor of Delta State. In 2009, he joined the Delta State Oil Producing Areas Development Commission (DESOPADEC) as one of its pioneer senior staff but later resigned to contest for the Warri South 1, Constituency seat in the Delta State House of Assembly.

Tidi was appointed as Special Assistant (News Media) to the governor of Delta State, Ifeanyi Okowa, in July 2015. In September 2017, he contested for the office of chairman of Warri South Local Government Area on the platform of the Peoples Democratic Party and was elected.
