= Escravos River =

River in southern Nigeria

Coordinates: 5°35′N 5°10′E

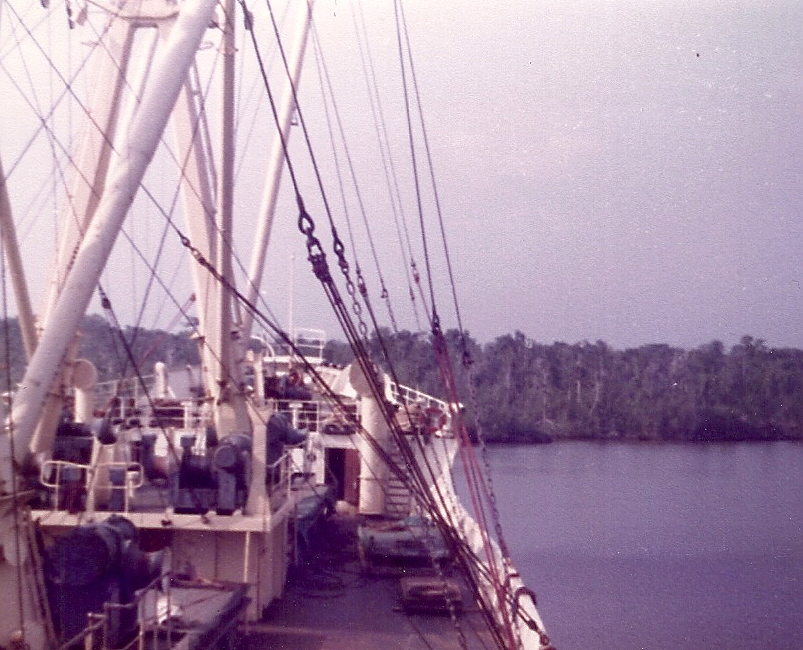
Escravos River to Sapele 1979

The Escravos River is a river in southern Nigeria, close to the city of Warri.Escravo is a Portuguese word meaning "slaves" and the area was one of the main conduits for slave trade between Nigeria and the United States in the 18th century. The Escravos is a distributary of the Niger River, flowing for 57 kilometres (35 mi), to its mouth in the Bight of Benin of the Gulf of Guinea in the Atlantic Ocean. Chevron, a major US oil company, has its main Nigerian oil production facility at the mouth of the Escravos River.

The Escravos is linked by a maze of interconnected waterways to the Forcados, Warri, Benin, and Ethiope rivers.

The Nigerian Ports Authority (N.P.A.) granted dredging of Escravos River primarily to expand the waterways so as to make way for bigger vessels which will eventually boost the economic activity of the region and benefit the country at large.

== Water Pollution ==
When chemicals contaminate water sources, the water becomes unsafe for use in drinking, cooking, cleaning, swimming, and other activities. Chemicals, waste, microorganisms, and parasites are examples of pollutants. All types of pollutants eventually end up in water. On lakes and oceans, air pollution settles. An subterranean stream, a river, and finally the ocean can all be contaminated by land. Waste placed in a vacant lot can therefore eventually contaminate a water source.

== Causes of Water Pollution ==
Given that water is a universal solvent and a necessity for life, water contamination is a serious problem. Industrial waste, marine dumping, sewage and wastewater, oil spills and leaks, agriculture, climate change, radioactive waste, and nuclear energy facilities are the seven main causes of water pollution. Industrial waste, which is generated by businesses, can contaminate freshwater systems with hazardous chemicals and other pollutants, rendering the water unsuitable for human consumption and changing the temperature of the freshwater systems. When waste is dumped into ocean waters, it can take anywhere between two and 200 years for it to entirely degrade. Even after treatment, hazardous chemicals, germs, and pathogens can still be present in sewage and wastewater, posing health risks to both people and animals. oil drilling operations or ships transporting oil are both responsible for oil leaks and spills.

=== Control ===
Water pollution is a major problem that disrupts ecosystems and harms human health and the economy. To keep a clean water supply, proper water treatment policies and administration are essential. People can pick up pet waste, avoid flushing non-biodegradable items, and keep their cars in good condition to prevent pollution. Regular maintenance and proper pet waste disposal can lower pollution levels and improve vehicle efficiency. We can work towards a cleaner and healthier water supply by doing these actions.
