= Koko, Delta State =

Town in Delta, Nigeria

Koko
- Town
- Nickname: Nanna Town
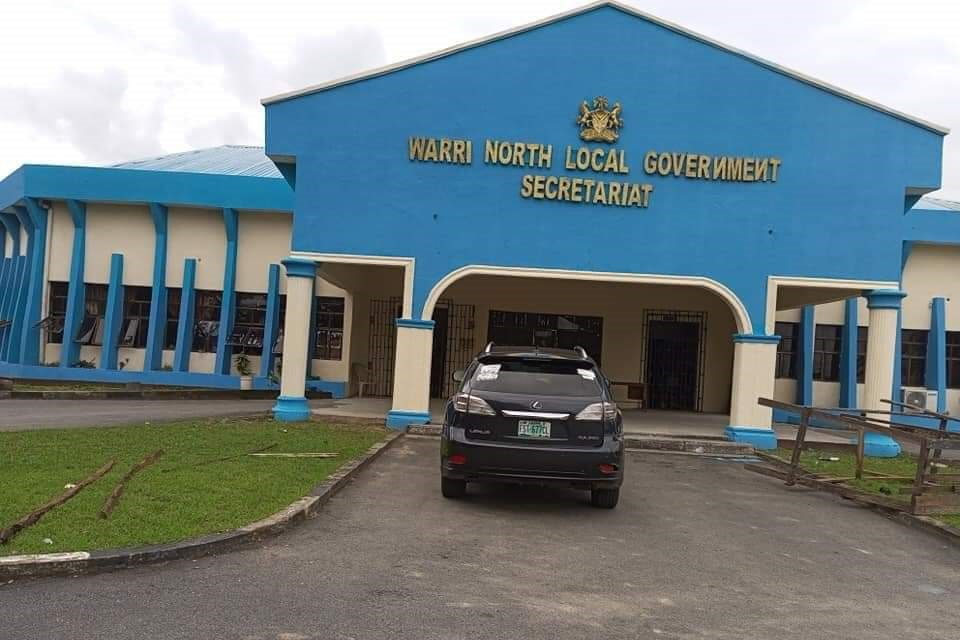
- Warri North Local Government Secretariat

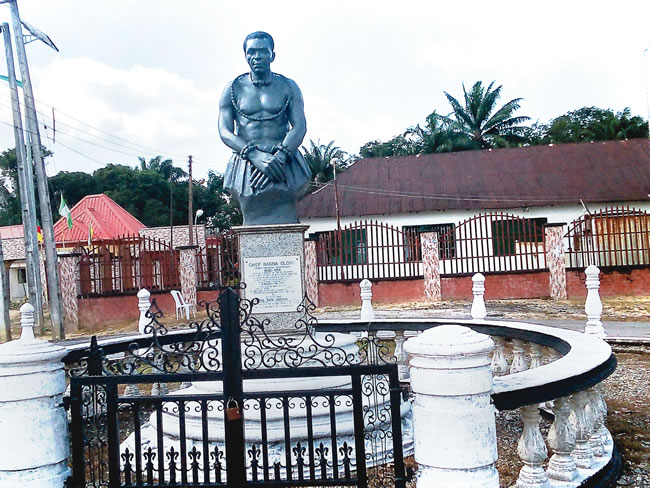

- Location in Nigeria
- Coordinates: 6°0′N 5°28′E
- Country: Nigeria
- State: Delta State
- Local Government Area: Warri North LGA

Government
  - Executive Governor: Sheriff Oborevwori
  - LGA Chairman: Hon Festus Ani Ashima
  - Traditional Ruler: Ogiame Atuwatse III

Demographics
  - Ethnicities: Itsekiri,
  - Languages: Itsekiri, Pidgin English
  - Religions: Christianity, African Traditions,

Koko is the major town in and the headquarters of Warri North Local Government Area of Delta State, South South Nigeria. It is one of the major towns in the Niger Delta region.

== History ==
The town of Koko is home to the Itsekiris, one of the major ethnic groups in Delta State. The town was a major trading hub for goods such as palm oil, rubber and timber.

Koko is home to Nana Olomu, the merchant Prince of the Niger Delta. He is a very prominent Itsekiri personality and traded with the British as the Governor of the Benin River before they turned on him to fight the Ebrohimi expedition against him. On his return from exile, he settled with his family at Koko, his farming settlement wherein he engaged over 500 of his servants for cultivation purposes prior to his appointment as Governor of Benin River. On his return from exile, he constructed an edifice known then as Nanna Palace. This palace is now known as the Nanna Living History Museum, Koko. As a result of this, the town is a major tourist destination with a lot of tourists visiting the Nanna Living History Museum including Ogiame Atuwatse III, who visited the museum year 2023.

Koko is home to one of the four ports in Delta State. It was a previously very busy port before the neglect of the Delta ports by the Federal Government. In recent times, the Federal Government of Nigeria has promised to revive the ports and awarded contracts but these have not been reflected in economic activities in these ports.

In 1988, the town drew international attention after it was discovered that it was one of several West African ports being used by waste brokers to dump toxic waste. To date, the Koko community have not recovered from the incident of the toxic waste dump.

== Tourism ==
=== Festivals ===
Koko town is home to a lot of festivals, especially towards the end of each year.

==== Neville's Day ====
One of the most popular festivals in Koko is Neville's Day celebrated by the Nanna family of Koko to mark the return of Nanna from exile. This event was Nanna's idea, which his descendants have maintained for the last 100 years. This event holds every 8th ofm August yearly with slight variations depending on family needs and decisions.

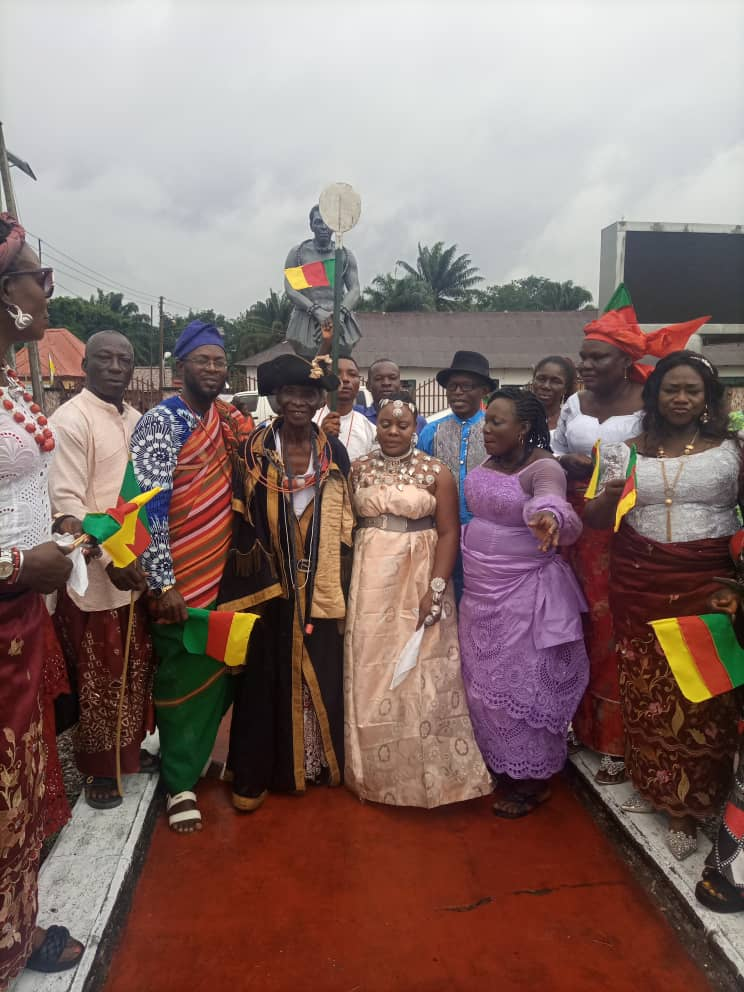
Neville's Day Celebration at Koko

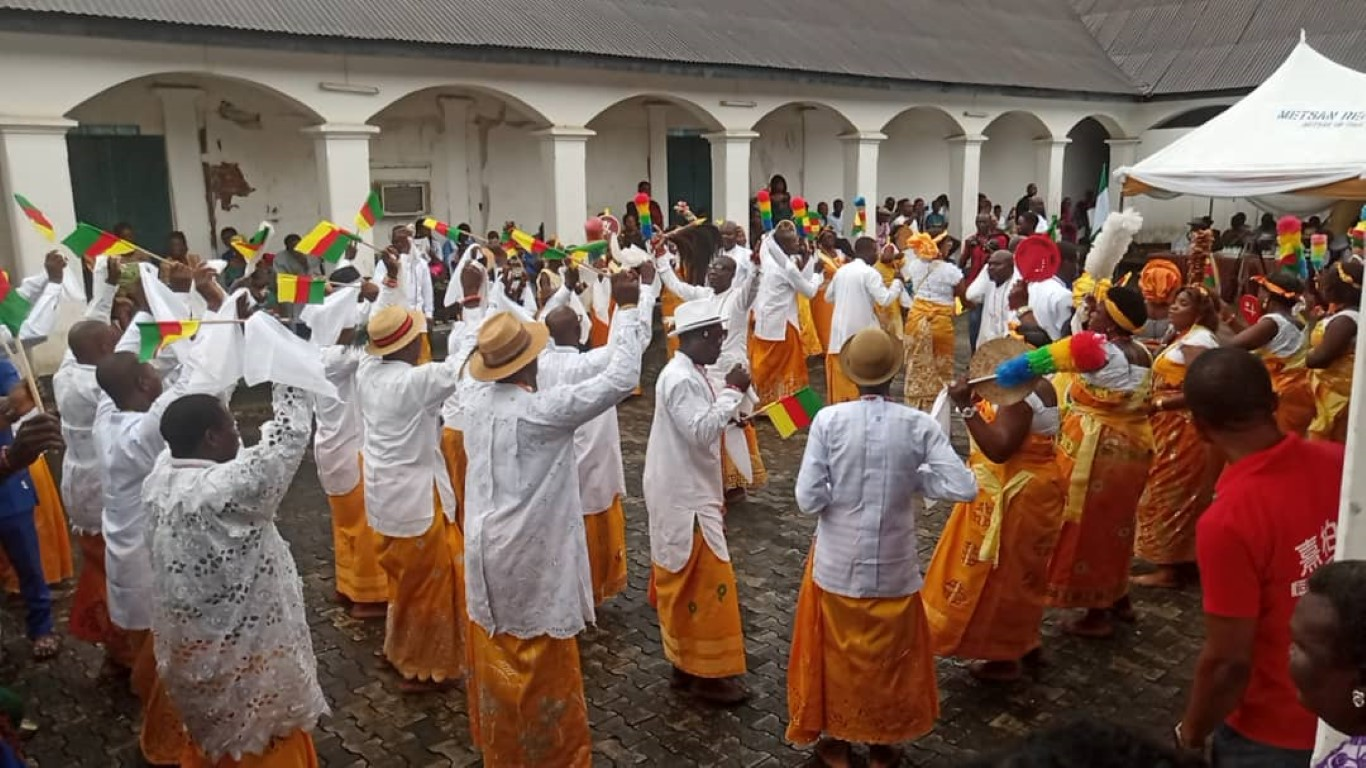
2022 Neville's Day Celebration at Koko Town

==== Ulu Kompini ====
The ujo Kompini dance is an annual, end-of-year dance by the kompini group in Koko. This event features traditional Itsekiri singing and dancing, including masquerades attracting many tourists from all over the world. There is also the Oromi dance, which is a traditional worship practised by some Itsekiri people.

==== Oma-Olubi Cultural Festival ====
Oma-Olubi Cultural Festival: A major three-day event held in Koko, showcasing Itsekiri culture through masquerades (like the famous Iwere), traditional dances (Omoko), and cultural presentations.

==== Beach Ipi Festival ====
Beach Ipi Festival: Another cultural festival celebrated in Koko, highlighting local heritage and traditions, often shared through videos online.

==== Freedom Masquerade Cultural Festival ====
Hosted by the Freedom Cultural Society, Koko, this is a three-day festival featuring Itsekiri masquerade displays and the special Itsekiri traditional dance, Ogono. It includes nine unique masquerades presented over three sessions each day. This takes place every November.

== Economy ==
=== Traditional ===
Koko town is home to a number of traditional crafts such as pottery, weaving, and woodcarving. These crafts are passed down from generation to generation and are an important part of the town's cultural heritage.

=== Modern ===
Koko town has agro-processing farms, bakeries and block industries. There are firms in the oil and gas industry with Ebenco Group, Total Energy, Nigerian Port Authority, Awaritse Nigeria Limited, Optima Energy, Lusanga Oil and Gas, Sharon Oil and Gas, Green Mark Oil and Gas, and Taurus Oil and Gas being some of the biggest companies in Koko. These firms are into Petroleum Depot/Bulk storage facilities, Petroleum Products, etc. There are filling stations and more than five hotels in the town. There are financial service providers in both the formal and informal sectors.

== Facilities ==
- Nigerian Port Authority
- Warri North Local Government Area Secretariat
- Koko General Hospital
- Federal Government Agricultural Agency (Agric farm)
- Koko mini sports stadium
- Ecobank
- Nanna Living History Museum

== Governance ==
Koko town is the local government headquarters for Warri North Local Government Area of Delta State. It is administered by a Local Government Chairman, a Vice Chairman, a Secretary and a list of councillors from the different wards. Elections are held every three years but this is not consistent due to the Governors using the Local Government Councils as payment for political favour by setting up an interim administration. Warri North Local Government Council is the primary provider of local government services for the town and neighbouring communities.

=== Warri North LGA Leadership ===
The following persons have held the positions of leadership at Warri North Local Government Council since the creation of the council.

| Chairman | Vice Chairman | Secretary |
|---|---|---|
| Chief Otimeyin Adams | | |
| Chief Solomon Arenyeka | | |
| Chief Kofi Kartey | | |
| Benson Asin | Isaac Wilkie | |
| Michael Diden | Dio Tanga | |
| Godwin Ebosa | Dio Tanga | |
| David Edun | | |
| Chief Francis Maku | Michael Abilo | |
| Aduge Okorodudu | Michael Abilo | |
| Smart Asekutu | Solomon Mikie | Samuel Meyiwa Khalil |
| Hon Festus Ani Ashima | | |

== Education ==
Koko town like most other towns in Delta state is home to different forms of education, both formal and informal education.

=== Schools ===
Primary schools in Koko are:

- Ojomba Primary School, Koko
- Akwarajor Primary School, Koko
- Gogomeje Primary School, Koko

Secondary schools in Koko are:

- Beach Secondary School, Koko
- Iwere College, Koko
- Irene Imilar Secondary School, Koko

=== Museum ===
- Nannna Living History Museum
