= Warri South =

- LGA
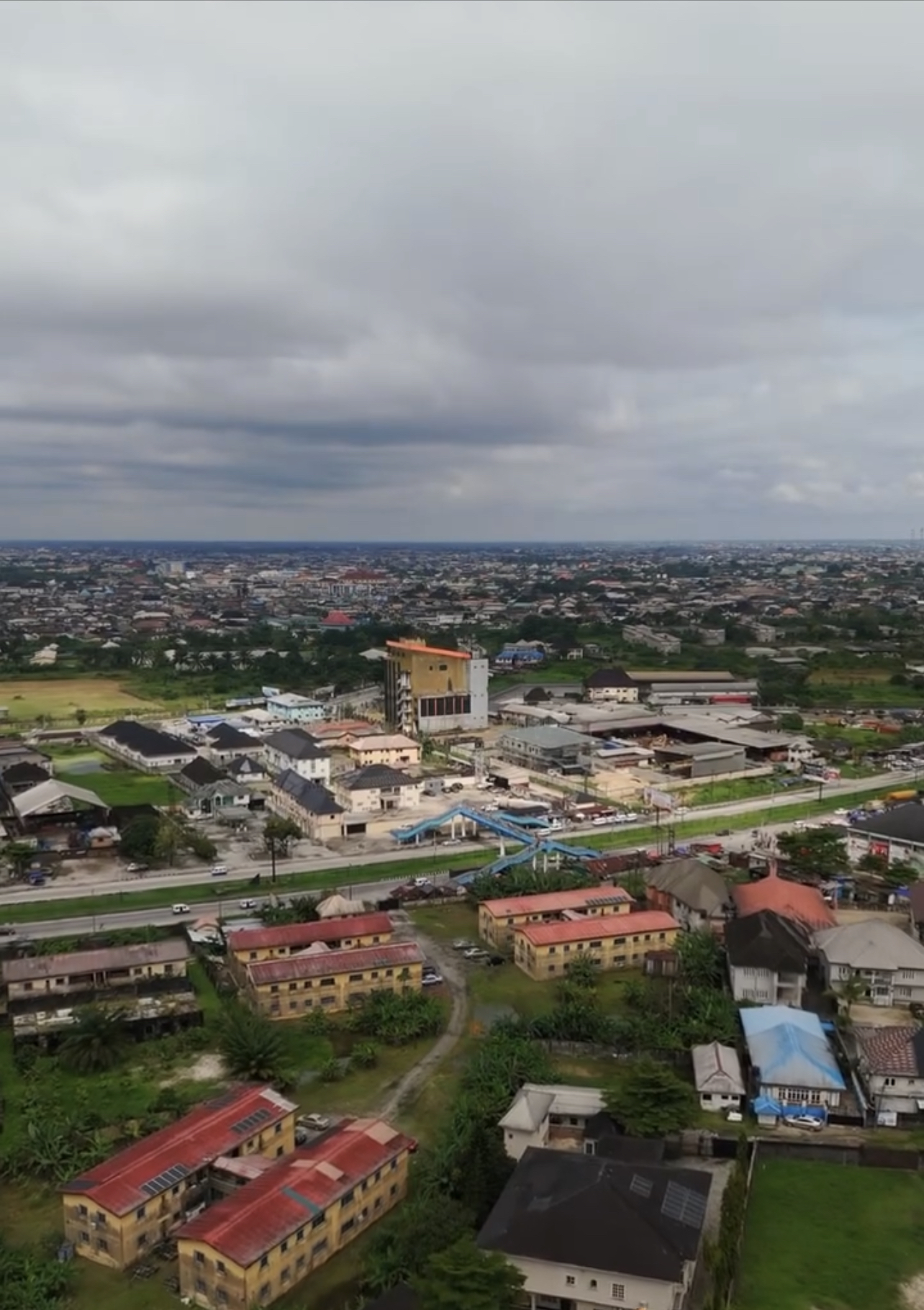
- Interactive map of Warri South
- Country: Nigeria
- State: Delta State
- Headquarters: Warri

Area
  - Total: 633 km^{2} (244 sq mi)

Population (2006)
  - Total: 427,600
  - Density: 676/km^{2} (1,750/sq mi)
- Time zone: UTC+1 (WAT)
- Postal code: 332

Warri South is a Local Government Area of Delta State, Nigeria. Its headquarters is in the city of Warri. This LGA has a total population of 311,970 people as at the 2006 census.

It has an important sea port in the country and is the commercial nerve centre of the state, With Hon. Agbateyiniro Weyinmi Isaac as the current local government chairman.

== See also ==
- Warri
