= 2020 in Nigeria =

- Decades: 2000s; 2010s; 2020s
- See also: Other events of 2020; Timeline of Nigerian history

The following is a list of events in 2020 in Nigeria.

== Incumbents ==
=== Federal government ===
- President: Muhammadu Buhari (APC)
- Vice President: Yemi Osinbajo (APC)
- Senate President: Ahmed Lawan (APC)
- House Speaker: Femi Gbajabiamila (APC)
- Chief Justice: Ibrahim Tanko Muhammad

=== Governors ===
- Abia State: Okezie Ikpeazu (PDP)
- Adamawa State: Ahmadu Umaru Fintiri (PDP)
- Akwa Ibom State: Udom Gabriel Emmanuel (PDP)
- Anambra State: Willie Obiano (APGA)
- Bauchi State: Bala Muhammed (PDP)
- Bayelsa State: Henry Seriake Dickson (PDP) (until 14 February); Duoye Diri (PDP) (starting 14 February)
- Benue State: Samuel Ortom (PDP)
- Borno State: BabaGana Umara (APC)
- Cross River State: Benedict Ayade (PDP)
- Delta State: Ifeanyi Okowa (PDP)
- Ebonyi State: Dave Umahi (PDP)
- Edo State: Godwin Obaseki (APC)
- Ekiti State: Kayode Fayemi (APC)
- Enugu State: Ifeanyi Ugwuanyi (PDP)
- Gombe State: Muhammad Inuwa Yahaya (APC)
- Imo State: Emeka Ihedioha (PDP) (until 15 January); Hope Uzodinma (APC) (starting 15 January)
- Jigawa State: Badaru Abubakar (APC)
- Kaduna State: Nasir Ahmad el-Rufai (APC)
- Kano State: Abdullahi Umar Ganduje (APC)
- Katsina State: Aminu Bello Masari (APC)
- Kebbi State: Abubakar Atiku Bagudu (APC)
- Kogi State: Yahaya Bello (APC)
- Kwara State: AbdulRahman AbdulRasaq (APC)
- Lagos State: Babajide Sanwo-Olu (APC)
- Nasarawa State: Abdullahi Sule (APC)
- Niger State: Abubakar Sani Bello (APC)
- Ogun State: Dapo Abiodun (APC)
- Ondo State: Oluwarotimi Odunayo Akeredolu (APC)
- Osun State: Adegboyega Oyetola (APC)
- Oyo State: Oluwaseyi Makinde (PDP)
- Plateau State: Simon Lalong (APC)
- Rivers State: Ezenwo Nyesom Wike (PDP) (since 29 May 2015)
- Sokoto State: Aminu Waziri Tambuwal (PDP)
- Taraba State: Arch. Darius Ishaku (PDP)
- Yobe State: Mai Mala Buni (APC)
- Zamfara State: Bello Matawalle (PDP)

== Events ==
=== January ===
- 3 January – 19 people are killed and homes and other buildings are burned by unidentified gunmen in Tawari, Kogi State.
- 6 January – 2020 Gamboru bombing: 30 killed and 35 injured in a bomb explosion in Gamboru, Borno State, apparently by Boko Haram.
- 8 January – American rapper Cardi B announces she will seek Nigerian citizenship.
- 15 January – 50th anniversary of the end of the Nigerian Civil War (1967–1970).
- 16 January – Three aid workers who were held hostage since 22 December 2019 are released in Borno State.
- 24 January – Lassa fever outbreak kills 29 in 11 states this month.
- 31 January – U.S. President Donald Trump expands the travel ban to include Nigeria and five other countries.

=== February ===
- 1 February – A ban on commercial motorcycles goes into effect in Lagos State.
- 4 February
  - US $300 million (£230 million) seized from former president Sani Abacha's laundered accounts will be returned to Nigeria.
  - Senate approves budget for customs.
- 7 February – American rapper Lil Wayne says, "I'm more Nigerian than American."
- 9 February – At least 30 people killed in Auno, Borno State, apparently by Boko Haram.
- 14 February – International flights to Murtala Muhammed International Airport in Lagos are diverted to Accra International Airport in Accra, Ghana, due to poor weather and complications with new equipment.
- 27 February – A stolen bronze statue from Ifẹ in the Yoruba kingdom is seized at the Mexico City International Airport and returned to Nigeria. The statue is later found to be a fake.
- 28 February – The Federal Ministry of Health has confirmed an Italian citizen who works in Lagos has been confirmed as the first case of COVID-19 in Nigeria and sub-Saharan Africa.

=== March ===
- 4 March - Four police officers and two militiamen were killed by Boko Haram militants during a raid on an army base in Damboa, Borno State.
- 9 March – The emir of Kano, Lamido Sanusi, is dethroned for "disrespect to lawful instructions".
- 15 March - Abule-Ado explosion, Lagos State, killed at least 15 people and destroyed around 50 buildings.
- 24 March – March 2020 Chad and Nigeria massacres: About 70 soldiers are ambushed and killed by Boko Haram in Goneri village, Borno State.

=== April ===
- 13 April – People of African origin, including Nigerians, have faced discrimination in Guangzhou and elsewhere in China. Africans from Nigeria, Togo and Benin have been evicted from hotels in the middle of the night, a group of African students was forced to take COVID-19 tests despite not having travelled recently, and others reported being threatened with having their visas and work permits revoked.
- 17 April – Considerable fake news about the coronavirus is circulating in Africa.
- 18 April – April 2020 Katsina attacks: Armed bandits kill 47 people in attacks on villages in Katsina State.
- 19 April – Twenty-one employees of ExxonMobil from Akwa Ibom State were arrested for violating state quarantine standards in Rivers State, but were released when the union threatened industrial action. It is unknown if any of the arrested men have symptoms of infection.
- 23 April – Nigeria has tested only 7,153 people for COVID-19, 0.03% of the population. 873 cases and 28 deaths have been reported, but the Africa Centers for Disease Control fears the numbers may go much higher.
- 25 April – The Central Bank of Nigeria took 1.47 trillion naira ($3.8 billion) from lenders as additional cash reserves for failing to meet regulatory targets.
- 28 April – Gravediggers in Kano report a mysterious increase in deaths. There is speculation that the deaths may be linked to the coronavirus pandemic, but no one knows since autopsies are not routinely done. Another possibility is that the deaths may be related to other underlying diseases such as hypertension, diabetes, meningitis and acute malaria that have gone untreated because many hospitals are closed.
- 30 April – Confirmed COVID-19 cases in Kano triple from 77 at the beginning of the week to 219 as health authorities ramp up "verbal autopsies". State officials insist most of the fatalities were due to other diseases rather than COVID-19. Nasiru Sani Gwarzo, head of the presidential COVID-19 taskforce sent to Kano, said the rise in deaths was also due to cuts to medical services for other ailments as a result of the crisis.

=== May ===
- 6 May – Olalekan Hameed is sentenced to death in a trial broadcast on Zoom for the murder of his employer's mother.
- 15 May – A controversial plan to close Koranic schools in 19 northern states and sending ′′almajirai′′ (″pupils″) home results in spreading COVID-19. Sixty-five boys test positive in Kaduna, 91 in Jigawa, eight in Gombe, and seven in Bauchi State.
- 18 May – Boko Haram extremists attacked a village just as people were preparing to break their Ramadan fast after sundown, killing at least 20 people in the first attack of its kind in northeastern Nigeria since the holy month began.
- 30 May – #JusticeForUwa is trending in Nigeria, with the family of Uwavera Omozuwa family appealing for help to track down her rapists and killers in a church in Benin City, Edo State.

=== June ===
- 9 June – Gunmen suspected of belonging to Boko Haram kill 81 villagers in Borno State. Another 20 people are killed in an attack in Katsina State.
- 10 June – The World Trade Organization accepts the nomination of two-time Nigerian minister Okonjo-Iweala as its Director-General.
- 11 June – An Aide-de-camp to First Lady Aisha Buhari is arrested after shooting at presidential nephew and aide Sabiu Yusuf when the latter refuses to go into self-isolation after a trip to Lagos.
- 12 June
  - Comments by Senator Bola Tinubu, National Leader of the All Progressives Congress
  - All 36 of Nigeria's governors resolved to declare a state of emergency over rape and other gender-based violence against women and children in the country.
  - U.S.-based streaming company Netflix pairs up with filmmaker Mo Abudu, owner of EbonyLife TV (ELTV), to create two new TV series and several films.
- 22 June – Cross River gorillas including babies, once thought to be an extinct species, are captured on film by conservationists in the Mbe Mountains near the border with Cameroon.

=== July ===
- 8 July – Nnamdi Azikiwe International Airport in Abuja and Murtala Muhammed International Airport in Lagos reestablish domestic flights after a three-month shutdown; other airports will open soon. No date has been given for the resumption of international flights.
- 13 July – A retired American woman was rescued by a Police Intelligence Response Team after being held hostage for 15 months by a 34-year-old man in a hotel. The man had extorted US$48,000 from her.
- 18 July – Between three and 16 security forces died and up to 28 are wounded in an attack inside a forest near Jibia in Katsina state.
- 23 July – Militants from the Islamic State West Africa Province, which broke away from Boko Haram several years ago, claimed responsibility for killing five aid workers who were kidnapped last month in northeastern Nigeria.
- 29 July - Fourteen people are killed in a mass shooting in Kogi State.

=== August ===
- 11 August – Musician Yahaya Sharif-Aminu, 22, is sentenced to death by hanging in Kano State for blasphemy against Muhammad. A number of Independent UN human rights experts, including the UN Special Rapporteur in the field of cultural rights, Karima Bennoune, urged the Government to immediately release the singer.
- 20 August – The army regains control of Kukawa, Borno, where the Islamic State West Africa Province (ISWAP) had taken hundreds of captives on 18 August.
- 23 August – Two die in clashes between security forces and Biafran separatists.
- 25 August - Eighteen people were killed after Islamic State in West Africa militants planted an improvised explosive device on the road between Monguno and Baga, Borno.

=== October ===
- 20 October - Lekki massacre in the #Endsars protest, armed security personnel use live bullets to disperse crowd in Lekki leading to casualties and fatalities. Lagos State's governor declares a 24 hours curfew in the state.
- 24 October – Last sighting of reporter Pelumi Onifade alive in police custody. He was detained while covering the #EndSARS Protests would later be found dead at a mortuary several days later under unclear circumstances.
- 30 October – NaijaHacks, Africa's largest Hackathon, holds NaijaHacks from home 2020 Hackathon.
- 31 October - United States Navy SEALs from the Naval Special Warfare Development Group rescued a 27-year-old American hostage held captive by armed gunmen near the border with Niger.

=== November ===
- 14 November – Witnesses say that soldiers shot civilians during a peaceful protest is Lagos on 20 October.
- 28 November - Koshebe massacre: 110 civilians and peasant farmers were killed and six were wounded as they worked in rice fields in Koshebe village. It is the deadliest attack against civilians in Nigeria this year.

=== December ===
- 8 December – Amnesty International says 10,000 civilians have died while in police custody since the beginning of the Boko Haram insurgency in 2011.
- 14 December – About half the 800 boys kidnapped by bandits in Katsina State are still unaccounted for.
- 16 December – Seventeen of the schoolboys kidnapped by Boko Haram are rescued and two are killed; 300 are still unaccounted for.
- 18 December – The schoolboys are released. One hundred girls kidnapped in the 2014 Chibok kidnapping are still missing.
- 22 December – Eighty Muslim schoolboys are kidnapped and then released in Katsina State.
- 25 December – Boku Haram militants kill eleven people and burn a church in Pemi, Borno State.
- 29 December – The International Monetary Fund estimates the GDP of Nigeria at US$442.976 billion, making it the largest in Africa and the 26th largest in the world.
- 31 December – Traditional Christian "crossover" end-of-year celebrations are subdued as churches are held to 50% capacity. Nigeria has had 85,500 confirmed cases of the coronavirus and 1,260, although the actual totals may be higher because of a low testing rate.
- December – Akwa Ibom Christmas Village is inaugurated by Governor Udom Emmanuel.

=== Scheduled events ===
- 29 October − Mawlid Muslim and public holiday
- 22 December – Sambisa Memorial Day, Borno State
- 25 December – Christmas Day (Christian holiday)
- 26 December – Boxing Day public holiday

== Deaths ==
=== January ===
- 9 January – Chukwuemeka Ike, writer.
- 13 January – Toyosi Arigbabuwo, actor.

=== February ===
- 2 February – Peter Aluma, basketball player.
- 4 February
  - Asiwaju Yinka Mafe, politician.
  - Adnan Bostaji, Saudi Arabian ambassador to Nigeria.
- 10 February – Ignatius Datong Longjan, politician and Senator.
- 12 February – Victor Olaiya, highlife trumpeter.
- 14 February – Peter Iornzuul Adoboh, Roman Catholic prelate, bishop of Katsina-Ala.

=== March ===
- 1 March
  - Pa Kasumu, actor.
  - Ndidi Nwosu, powerlifter and Paralympic champion.
- 22 March – Ifeanyi George, footballer.

=== April ===
- 11 April – Dr. Aliyu Yakubu, doctor.
- 15 April – Dr. Emeka Chugbo, doctor.
- 21 April – Richard Akinjide, jurist and former Minister of Justice.
- 30 April – Tony Allen, drummer.

=== June ===
- 1 June – Majek Fashek, reggae singer and songwriter.
- 17 June – Dan Foster, DJ and judge on Nigeria's Got Talent.
- 23 June – Shafkat Bose Adewoyin, Nollywood actress.
- 25 June
  - Abiola Ajimobi, politician, former Governor of Oyo State.
  - Ogun Majek, Nollywood actor
- 28 June – Nasir Ajanah, chief judge of Kogi State.
- 29 June – Bode Akindele, Parakoyi of Ibadanland and businessman.

=== July ===
- 6 July – Inuwa Abdulkadir, politician.
- 8 July – Jimmy Johnson, actor.
- 14 July – Tolulope Arotile, helicopter pilot.
- 20 July – Ismaila Isa Funtua, politician.

=== August ===
- 4 August – Joseph Thlama Dawha, chemical engineer, former managing director of the Nigerian National Petroleum Corporation.
- 8 August – Buruji Kashamu, politician, former Senator.
- 15 August – Wilberforce Juta, politician, former Governor of Gongola State.
- 31 August – John Felagha, footballer.

=== September ===
- 4 September – Ajibade Babalade, 48, footballer (Shooting Stars, national team); cardiac arrest.
- 13 September – Ayo Akinwale, actor.
- 17 September – Jimoh Aliu, actor.
- 20 September – Shehu Idris, 84, aristocrat, Emir of Zazzau (since 1975).

=== October ===
- 12 October – Abai Ikwechegh, 97, jurist.
- 13 October – J. P. Clark, 85, poet.
- 26 October – Theophilus Adeleke Akinyele, 88, civil servant.

=== December ===
- 11 December – Sam Nda-Isaiah, 58, political columnist, entrepreneur and journalist, founder of Leadership.
- 17 December – Peter Yariyok Jatau, 89, Roman Catholic prelate, Archbishop of Kaduna (1975–2007).
- 21 December – Ikenwoli Godfrey Emiko, 65, traditional ruler, Olu of Warri (since 2015); COVID-19.
- 25 December – Chico Ejiro, film producer and director, seizure.
- 29 December – Gregory Ochiagha, 89, Roman Catholic prelate, Bishop of Orlu (1980–2008).

== See also ==
- Nigeria Vision 2020
- Economy of Nigeria
- Human rights in Nigeria
- Boko Haram insurgency
- Kankara kidnapping
- 2020 in politics and government
- Nigeria national football team results (2020–present)
- Nigeria national under-19 cricket team
- List of highest-grossing Nigerian films
- List of Nigerian actors
- List of Nigerian films of 2020
- COVID-19 pandemic in Nigeria
