= Ogiame Atuwatse III =

Nigerian traditional ruler (born 1984)

Olu of Warri
- Reign: 21 August 2021 – present
- Predecessor: Ogiame Ikenwoli I
- Born: Utieyinoritsẹtsọla Emiko; 2 April 1984 (age 42); Warri, Nigeria
- Spouse: Olori Ivie Atuwatse III
- Issue: 3
- Father: Olu Atuwatse II
- Education: Case Western Reserve University
- Website: warrikingdom.org

Ogiame Atuwatse III (born 2 April 1984) is a Nigerian traditional king of the Kingdom of Warri in the Delta State. He was born Utieyinoritsetsola Emiko, also known as Tsola Emiko, on April 2, 1984 to Olu Atuwatse II, the 19th Olu of Warri, and Gladys Durorike Emiko. He is also a descendant of Olu Akengbuwa.

He was crowned the 21st Olu of Warri on August 21, 2021 at Ode-Itsekiri, succeeding his uncle, Ogiame Ikenwoli I.

== Family ==
Ogiame Atuwatse III, born Utieyinoritsetsola Emiko, commonly known as "Oritsetsola" or "Tsola" Emiko, was born on 2 April 1984 to then Prince Godwin Toritseju Emiko, and Gladys Durorike Emiko (née Okunade). He was born in Warri during the reign of his grandfather, the 18th Olu of Warri, Erejuwa II. His mother is a member of the Yoruba ethnic group and the daughter of Oba Sijuade Okunade, the Ooni of Ife. His paternal great-grandfather was Olu Ginuwa II, and he is the 16th great-grandson in a direct male line of Olu Ginuwa, the first Olu of Warri. He is a distant relative of the Benin royal family through Ginuwa's grandfather, who was Oba Ewuare the Great of the Kingdom of Benin.

Through his mother, he is a descendant of the Royal Dynasty of Oranmiyan, and the Ogboruu Royal House of Ile-Ife, one of the four ruling houses. He is a great-great grandson of Adelekan Olubuse I, the 46th Ooni of Ife, and is also thus a direct descendant of the progenitor of the Ogboruu royal house, Ooni Ogboruu, the 19th Ooni of Ife. Through Ogboruu, he is also a descendant of Ooni Lajodoogun, and his father, Ooni Lajamisan, and thus a direct descendant of the semi-legendary founders of the Yoruba people, Oranmiyan and Oduduwa. He is also descended from Oranmiyan in a direct male line through his father, via the first Oba of Benin, Eweka, who was a son of Oranmiyan, and an ancestor to Olu Ginuwa and Oba Ewuare.

His father rose to the throne as the 19th Olu of Warri, Olu Atuwatse II, when Tsola was 2 years old after the death of his grandfather.

== Education and career ==
He attended NNPC Primary School in Warri and Adesoye College, Offa, Kwara State for his primary and secondary education respectively. He obtained a Bachelor of Arts in International Studies and Political Science from Case Western Reserve University, Cleveland, Ohio, USA in 2006. In 2007, he obtained a Masters of Science degree in Management from the same university’s Weatherhead School of Management.

In 2008, Ogiame Atuwatse III returned to Nigeria for the mandatory National Youth Service Corps and served in the Public Affairs Department of National Petroleum Investment Management Services (NAPIMS).

After NYSC, he worked as an officer at the Shell Nigeria Closed Pension Fund Administrator (SNCFPA) and Sahara Energy between 2010 and 2012.

He is a serial entrepreneur, having founded Noble Nigeria and Coral Curator. He is the Chairman of Ocean Marine Security and a Director at Gulf of Guinea and Vessellink Nig.

== Personal life ==
He has been married to Olori Ivie Atuwatse III, the daughter of late Nigerian billionaire businessman Hosa Wells Okunbo, since 2014. They have three children.

== Controversy surrounding ascension to the throne ==
The former Ologbotsere of Warri, Chief Ayiri Emami, planned to follow the tradition of succession, but Emiko had significant support despite his mother's Yoruba heritage (a 1979 edict stated that the mother of the Olu of Warri must have either Itsekiri or Benin origin). This led to a conflict but at the pronouncement of the death of Ikenwoli, Prince Tsola Emiko was declared the Olu-designate by the Iyatsere (second-in-command after the Ologbotsere).

A few days prior to the coronation of Prince Tsola Emiko, it was reported that the 400-year-old crown of the Olu of Warri was stolen. Due to multiple crowns existing, this did not hinder coronation.

== Awards ==
In October 2022, a Nigerian national honor of Commander of the Order of the Federal Republic (CFR) was conferred on him by President Muhammadu Buhari.
