= Atuwatse II =

Nigerian traditional ruler

Olu Atuwatsé II
- 19th Olu of Warri
- Reign: 2 May 1987 – September 2015
- Coronation: 2 May 1987
- Predecessor: Erejuwa II
- Successor: Olu Ikenwoli (Brother)
- Born: Godwin Toritseju Emiko; September 26, 1945; Ode-Itsekiri, Warri South, Delta State, Nigeria
- Died: September , 2015; Lagos, Nigeria
- Spouse: Gladys Durorike Emiko (née Okunade)
- Issue: Princess Nere Emiko-Teriba, Ogíamè Atuwatsé III CFR, Prince Toju Emiko, Prince Ola Emiko, Princess Neye Emiko
- House: House of Ginuwa
- Father: Erejuwa II
- Religion: Christianity
- Occupation: Traditional Ruler, Lawyer

Olu Atuwatse II was a Nigerian traditional title holder and paramount leader of the Itsekiri who was Olu of Warri from 1987 to 2015. He was the 19th Olu of Warri Kingdom with the title Ogiame Atuwatse II. He was born Godwin Toritseju Emiko. He succeeded his father Erejuwa II as the Olu of Warri. He was a lawyer by profession and was a recipient of the Commander of the Niger (CON) award from the Nigerian Government. He died in 2015 and was succeeded by his brother Ikenwoli.

Ogiame Atuwatse II was crowned on May 2, 1987, during an elaborate ceremony. It was recorded as the last official engagement of renowned politician and publisher, Chief Obafemi Awolowo. Awolowo died on May 9, 1987, a week after attending the coronation in Warri.

Atuwatse II died in a hospital in Lagos in early September 2015, after suffering a domestic accident. He was 70 years old, and was preparing to fly abroad to receive intensive medical care before his condition worsened.
