= Ayiri Emami =

Nigerian businessman

Chief Ayiri Emami
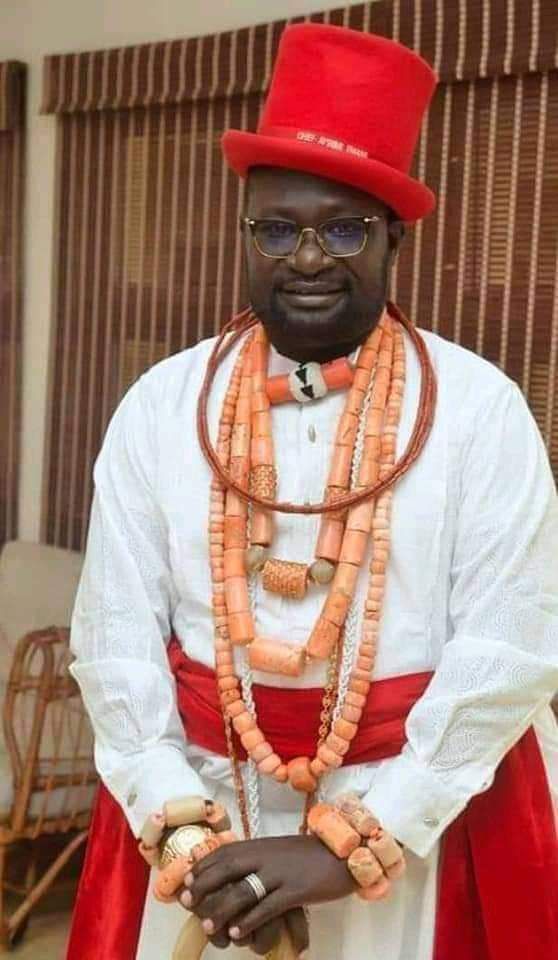
- Ologbotsere of Warri Kingdom
- Born: 26 April 1975 (age 51); Nigeria
- Occupation: Businessman
- Spouse: Asba Jite Emami
- Parent(s): Late Chief Akonu Emami &Mrs. Felicia Emami Nee Ogunfeyimi
- Website: ayirimiemami.com

Chief Ayiri Emami (born April 26, 1975) is a Nigerian businessman, politician, and philanthropist, the Chairman and Chief Executive Officer of A & E group, a company with investments in oil and gas, construction, haulage, entertainment and the hospitality industry.

He was the "Akulagba of Warri Kingdom" conferred on him by the Olu (king) of the Warri kingdom, Olu Atuwatse II. When his successor Ogiame Ikenwoli ascended the throne, he conferred on Ayiri Emami the title Ologbotsere (prime minister) of Warri kingdom. He was suspended on 30 March 2021 as Ologbotsere by the Ginuwa 1 Ruling House, and on October 5 2021, the Olu Ogiame Atuwatse III whose case is still in court for the ascension to the throne of Warri Kingdom as the 21st Olu recalled his right to the title Ologbotsere. However, Prince Yemi Emiko who was instrumental in paving the way for Ogiame Atuwatse III to become king has openly come out to say Emami's suspension was done in error.

== Early life ==
Chief Ayiri Emami was born in Warri North local government area of Delta state, South-South, Nigeria to the family of late Chief Akonu Emami & Mrs Felicia Emami nee Ogunfemi.

He attended Ikengbuwa primary school and Yonwuren College both in Warri, Delta State before proceeding to Delta State University where he acquired a bachelor's degree in political science.

== Work and career ==
He was one of the youngest founding members of the Peoples Democratic Party (PDP) in Warri, Delta State, and was the party chairman in Warri South-West local government area. He left the party and joined the ruling All Progressives Congress (APC) in Delta State in April 2015, becoming one of the party's leaders in the state.

He has served on the board of directors for Nigeria Cat Construction Company, and was the Chairman of the Delta State Waterways Security Committee, set up by the state government to reduce kidnapping and armed robbery in the Niger delta.

== Philanthropy ==
As a philanthropist, he has helped students finance their academic studies, and aided the financing of small-scale businesses for members of his community.

== Personal life ==
In 2009, he married Asba Jite Emami. The couple have three children.
