= Kingdom of Warri =

Traditional state in Delta State, Nigeria

The Kingdom of Warri, Warri Kingdom or Iwere Kingdom, (Itsekiri: Oye Iwere) was established in 1480, was part of the Nigerian traditional states its ancestral capital is based in Ode-Itsekiri, Warri South LGA, Delta State, Nigeria with a palace erected in 1950s in the heart of the city of Warri, Warri South LGA, Delta State, Nigeria.

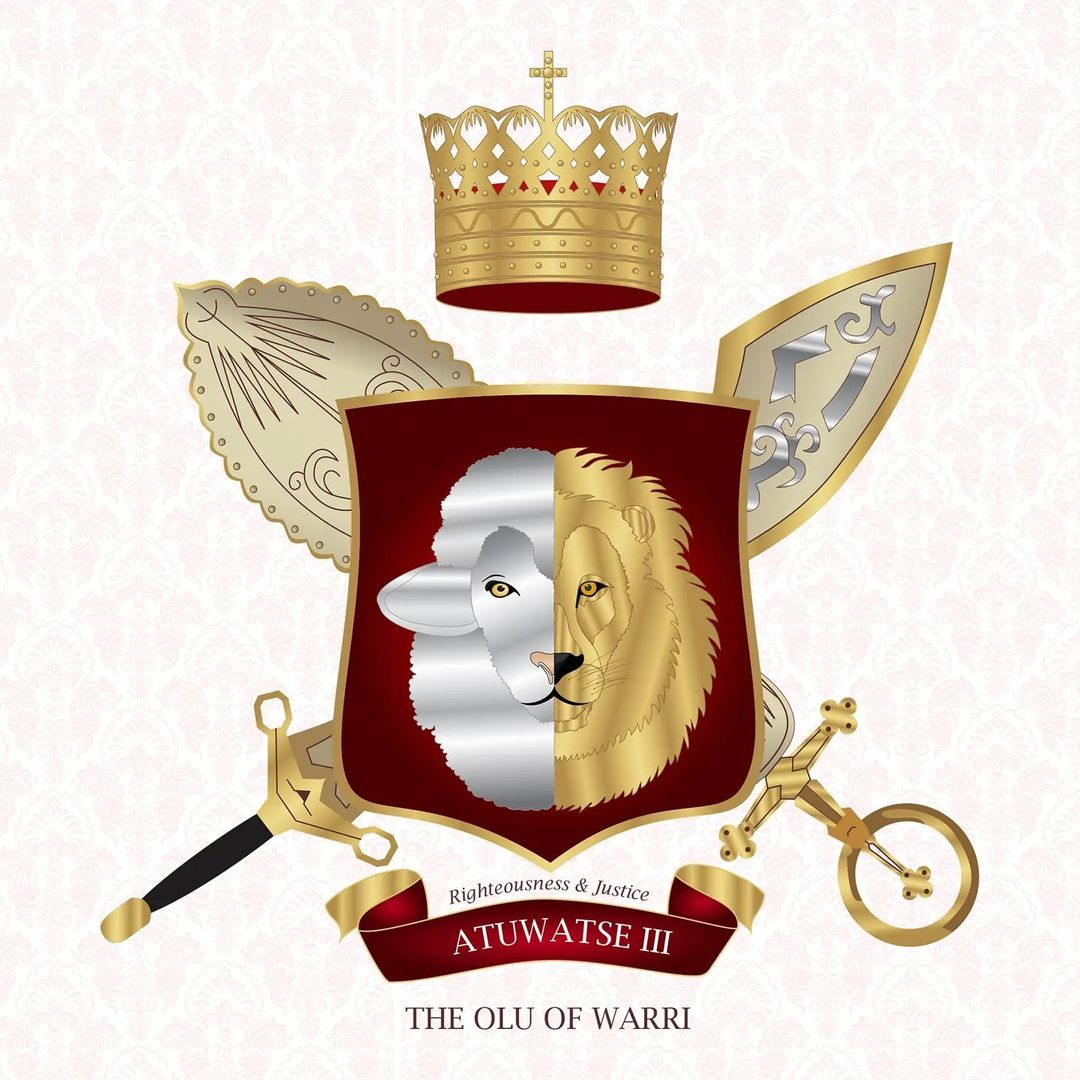

The current Olu of Warri is Ogiame Atuwatse III, who was crowned on 21 August 2021.

== History ==
According to Bini and Itsekiri histories, Olu Ginuwa, a prince of Benin Kingdom founded the Warri kingdom about 1480. In the 15th century, it was visited by Portuguese missionaries. At the beginning of the 17th century, a son of the reigning Olu was sent to Portugal and returned with a Portuguese wife. Their son Antonio Domingo was Olu of Warri in the 1640s. Olu Erejuwa, who reigned from about 1760 to 1800, expanded the kingdom politically and commercially, using the Portuguese to further its control of tributaries in river trade and to establish control over a wider area.

Later, Warri served as the base for Portuguese and Dutch slave traders. Warri became a more important port city during the late 19th century, when it became a centre for the palm oil trade and other major items such as rubber, palm products, cocoa, groundnuts, hides, and skins. Warri was established as a provincial headquarters by the British in the early 20th century.

=== The Size Of The Kingdom Of Warri ===
In the work of Jean-François Landolphe published from his diary described the size of Warri Kingdom “The sovereign of this state owns not only both banks of the Benin river but also all the rivers of these parts as far as the tributaries of the Calabar or are near to it."

=== Military ===
In 1656, the equipment of the Warri military included arrows and javelins with the use of few muskets. By the following century, Warri forces became accustomed to firearms. In the late 18th century, the watercraft of Warri were equipped with simple sails and primary sources documented that such vessels could carry some personnel of about hundred. According to historian Thornton, the Warri navy was unfamiliar with tacking. Shields were built onto the vessels to provide protection for the personnel.

Jean-François Landolphe provided a description of the King's canoes in the early 19th century which he mentions to have mounted seven blunderbusses arranged in series on a swivel. As a result, these guns could fire simultaneously and Landolphe states they were rarely used. Warri's military was largely naval as its armed forces seldom fought on land. A traveller estimated its naval and marine forces to number 60,000. But historian Thornton states that this figure was likely an exaggeration.

By the interregnum that began in 1848, however, Lloyd found no centralised royal navy. Wealthy merchants instead maintained their own armed followers and canoe fleets.

== Warri Crisis ==
The Warri Crisis was a series of conflicts in Delta State, Nigeria between 1997 and 2003 between the Itsekiri and the Ijaw ethnic groups. Over 200,000 people were displaced by the Warri conflict between 1999 and 2006. Over 700,000 people were displaced during this period by violence in Delta State overall.

The conflict broke out following the Ijaws refusal to accept the location of the Headquarters of the Warri South West Local Government Council (LGA) in Ogidigben, an Itsekiri community. The Council headquarters was eventually moved to Ogbe Ijoh, an Ijaw community by the State Govt; however it remains Ogidigben in Nigeria’s constitution.

The Warri Crisis is part of a broader conflict over oil in the Niger Delta. Human Rights Watch determined that "although the violence has both ethnic and political dimensions, it is essentially a fight over the oil money." Ongoing armed conflict in the Niger Delta region, and the appearance of the Movement for the Emancipation of the Niger Delta (MEND) in 2005 are continued expressions of these tensions.

Scholars have warned that the conflict is complex and not amenable to "quick fixes".

== Kings of Warri Kingdom, 1480 to present ==
The Kingdom of Warri has remained predominantly Christian since the coronation of its first Christian King/Olu Atorongboye also known as King Sebastian I in 1570, within a century of the foundation of the Iwere Kingdom. Below is a list of the rulers of the Warri Kingdom from inception. Note that written records began with the coronation of Olu Atorongboye Sebastian I in 1570.

Name	Lifespan	Reign start	Reign end	Notes	Family	Image
Ginuwa	Unknown - 1510 (aged 30+)	1480	1510	1st Olu. He was the eldest son of Oba Olua, the 14th Oba of Benin (r.1473–1480) and heir apparent to the throne of the Kingdom of Benin until he migrated from Benin to Warri, where he was later crowned.	Itsekiri	
Ijijen Ogbowuru	Unknown - 1510 (aged 28+)	1510	1538	2nd Olu. He succeeded his father. He was the first King to reach Ode-Itsekiri (Big Warri) as his father settled down at Ijala community which became the burial place for all future Olu's.	Itsekiri	
Irame	Unknown - 1550 (aged 40+)	1538	1550	3rd Olu. He succeeded his brother. It is stated that he banished the three gods (Ibirikimo, Otueke, and Ike) and their worshipers from Ode-Itsekiri-Olu (Big Warri) because of their incessant "noise-making". The gods and their worshipers moved to Orugbo which is a community about 3 km from Ode-Itsekiri-Olu.	Itsekiri	
Ojoluwa	Unknown - 1570 (aged 20+)	1550	1570	4th Olu. He succeeded his father. During his reign, he commenced the process of integration of the Ekpen's/Ekpenede, descendants of Okere with the local population in the kingdom.	Itsekiri	
Esigie	Unknown - 1597 (aged 27+)	1570	1597	5th Olu.He succeeded his father.	Itsekiri	
D. Sebastião Atorongboye	Unknown - 1625 (aged 28+)	1597	1625	6th Olu. He succeeded his father. He was born Prince Eyomasan. He was the first Catholic Olu, in fact every king after him until 1848 was so. He had a strong tie with King Philip II of Spain, who ruled Portugal at the time. This relation led to him sending his son to study in Coimbra, Portugal from 1600 to 1611. He and all future kings were awarded the title of Dom (D.).	Itsekiri	
D. Domingos Atuwatse I	Unknown - 1643 (aged 43+)	1625	1643	7th Olu. He succeeded his father. He was initially home schooled by his father and the Bishop in Ode-Itsekiri, which resulted in him being able to read and write in Portuguese. He was later educated in Coimbra, Portugal from 1600 to 1611. He returned as a graduate, making him the first graduate in Sub Saharan Africa. Olu Dom Domingos was the first to marry a noble Portuguese lady, that came with him in 1611.	Itsekiri	
D. Antonio Domingos Oyenakpagha Obanighenren	Unknown - 1653 (aged 11+)	1643	1654	8th Olu. He succeeded his father. On ascension to the throne he was named Obanighenren which translates to "Prince/King with the golden skin". He wrote a letter to Pope Clement X in 1652 which was delivered to the Pope successfully. He was educated at home and at an institute in Angola. Like his father, he married a Portuguese lady.	Luso Itsekiri	
D. Matias Ludovico Omoluyiri	Unknown - 1674 (aged 31+)	1654	1674	9th Olu. He succeeded his brother.	Luso Itsekiri	
D. Luigi Abejoye	Unknown - 1701 (aged 27+)	1674	1701	10th Olu. He succeeded his father.	Luso Itsekiri	
D. Sebastião II Akenjoye	Unknown - 1709 (aged 8+)	1701	1709	11th Olu. He succeeded his father. As a prince he was known as Dom Ludivico Domingo.	Itsekiri	
D. Miguel Omagboye	Unknown - 1730 (aged 21+)	1709	1730	12th Olu. He succeeded his father.	Itsekiri	
D. Agostinho Sabastião Octobia Akengboye	Unknown - 1732 (aged 4+)	1730	1734	13th Olu. He succeeded his father.	Itsekiri	
D. Manuel Octobia Atogbuwa	Unknown - 1760 (aged 26+)	1734	1760	14th Olu. He succeeded his father.	Itsekiri	
D.Sebastião Manuel Octobia Erejuwa I	Unknown - 1795 (aged 35+)	1760	1795	15th Olu. He succeeded his father.	Itsekiri	
D. Eyeolusan João Akengbuwa	Unknown - 14 June 1848 (aged 53+)	1795	14 June 1848	16th Olu. He succeeded his father. He was the last Catholic Olu.	Itsekiri	
Interregnum	14 June 1848 – 7 February 1936 (87 years)	14 June 1848	7 February 1936	After the death of Olu Dom Eyeolusan João Akengbuwa there was a dynastic crisis following the death of all the potential successors which was followed by a period of political Interregnum. His son Prince Oritsemone left Ode-Itsekiri during the period of the crisis to form the Usele Community. Queen Iye Idolorusan ruled the kingdom for a time in the nineteenth century, but seems to have never been formally designated a monarch.		
Ginuwa II Emiko Ikengbuwa	Unknown - 1949 (aged 13+)	7 February 1936	8 January 1949	17th Olu. He was a Nigerian traditional title holder and paramount leader of the Itsekiri. He was born Emiko Ikengbuwa. He succeeded his grandfather Olu Akengbuwa as Olu of Warri after an interregnum that lasted 88 years when Warri's political leadership was dominated by merchant princes.	Itsekiri	
Erejuwa II Wilson Ayoronmitsi Gbesimi Emiko	c.1908 - 17 December 1986 (aged 77/78)	24 March 1951	17 December 1986	18th Olu. He succeeded his father. He attended a CMS missionary school at Ogbesse, thereafter he did business with United African Company rising to become a provincial cooperatives president. As Olu of Warri, he was appointed regional Minister without portfolio and president of the Warri Divisional Traditional Council.	Itsekiri	
Olu Atuwatse II Godwin Toritseju Emiko	c.1945 - 5 September 2015 (aged 70)	2 May 1987	5 September 2015	19th Olu. He was born Godwin Toritseju Emiko. He succeeded his father. He was a lawyer by profession and was a recipient of the Commander of the Niger (CON) award from the Nigerian Government. Atuwatse II died in a hospital in Lagos in early September 2015, after suffering a domestic accident. He was 70 years old, and was preparing to fly abroad to receive intensive medical care before his condition worsened.	Itsekiri	
Ikenwoli I Godfery Emiko	19 March 1955 – 21 December 2020 (aged 65)	12 December 2015	21 December 2020	20th Olu. Ikenwoli Godfrey Emiko born to Olu Erejuwa II and Olori Eyinagboluwade Emiko. He succeeded his elder brother and was married to Olori Mary Emiko. They had three children.	Itsekiri	
Olu Atuwatse III	2 April 1984 - Present (aged 37)	21 August 2021		21st Olu. Tsola Emiko born to Olu Atuwatse II and Olori Gladys Durorike Emiko on 2 April 1984. He succeeded his uncle and is married to Olori Ivie Emiko (née Okunbo). They have three children.		
