= Ivie Atuwatse III =

Queen Consort of Iwere Kingdom

Olori Ivie Emiko-Atuwatsé III
- Olori Atuwatsé III
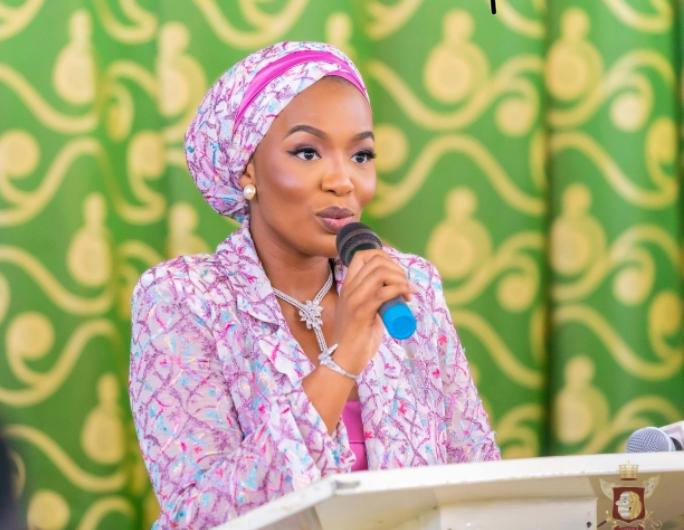
- Olori Atuwatsé III, Queen Consort of Iwere Kingdom

Queen Consort of Warri Kingdom
- Reign: 21 August 2021 – present
- Born: Aiyivieruewinoya 'Ivie' Uhunoma Okunbo; 22 May 1986 (age 40); Lagos, Nigeria
- Spouse: Ògíamẹ̀ Atuwatsé III CFR (m. 2014)
- Issue: 3
- House: House of Ginuwa (by marriage)
- Father: Hosa Wells Okunbo
- Mother: Edamwen Evelyn Okunbo
- Religion: Christianity
- Education: London School of Economics
- Occupations: Lawyer, Social Entrepreneur, Philanthropist
- Website: atuwatseiii.com

Ivie Atuwatse III (born 22 May 1986), is the Queen consort of Warri Kingdom as the wife of Ogiame Atuwatse III, the 21st Olu of Warri. After his coronation in August 2021, the Olu of Warri bestowed on her the Olori Atuwatse III title, now her official title.

== Background and education ==
Olori Atuwatse was born in Lagos, the eldest daughter of Nigerian businessman Hosa Wells Okunbo. She was educated in Nigeria and the United Kingdom. She received a Bachelor of Laws degree from the London School of Economics and was called to the Nigerian Bar in 2010.

== Philanthropy ==
Olori Atuwatse III has been involved in several endeavours targeting women and children, including the Captain Idahosa Wells Okunbo Stem Innovation Centre, which she established in honour of her father. She has also initiated several intervention programs for the poor in Delta State, including a 2022 visit to the Ureju Community, an oil rich slum suffering the effects of environmental degradation and Iyara, another slum community. Olori Atuwatse III is also an advocate for children’s rights, particularly the empowerment of female children. She has endowed hundreds of children with scholarships, including a 2022 scheme for 100 children from the Nana Model Girls College Warri, Warri, Delta State. Under her health initiatives, Olori Atuwatse III has promoted access to free healthcare, especially for the poor, and in December 2021, launched the Wuwu Ore medical and welfare outreach, focused on women, children and the elderly. A second edition of the program was held in Ugbolokposo Community, in the Delta state in April 2022.

== Personal life ==
Olori Atuwatse III married Ogiame Atuwatse III in November 2014. They have three children.
