= 2019 Ogun State House of Assembly election =

- March 9, 2019

All 26 seats in the Ogun State House of Assembly 14 seats needed for a majority
	Majority party
Leader	Olakunle Oluomo
Party	APC
Leader's seat	Ifo I
Last election	26
Seats after	26
Seat change	Steady
Speaker before election
Suraj Adekunbi
APC
Elected Speaker
Olakunle Oluomo
APC

The 2019 Ogun State House of Assembly election was held on March 9, 2019, to elect members of the Ogun State House of Assembly in Nigeria. All the 26 seats were up for election in the Ogun State House of Assembly. APC won 15 seats, APM won 7 seats, ADC won 3 seats, while PDP won 1 seat.

Upon the opening of the 9th State House of Assembly, Olakunle Oluomo (APC-Ifo I) was elected as Speaker of the House while Oludare Kadiri (APC-Ijebu North I) and Yusuf Sherif Abiodun (APC-Ado Odo Ota I) became Deputy Speaker and House Leader, respectively.

== Results ==
=== Ifo I ===
APC candidate Olakunle Oluomo won the election.

2019 Ogun State House of Assembly election
Party	Candidate	Votes	%
APC	Olakunle Oluomo		
APC hold			

=== Ijebu North II ===
APC candidate Oludare Kadiri won the election.

2019 Ogun State House of Assembly election
Party	Candidate	Votes	%
APC	Oludare Kadiri		
APC hold			

=== Ifo II ===
APM candidate Ganiyu Oyedeji won the election.

2019 Ogun State House of Assembly election
Party	Candidate	Votes	%
APM	Ganiyu Oyedeji		
APM hold			

=== Imeko Afon ===
ADC candidate Jemili Akingbade won the election.

2019 Ogun State House of Assembly election
Party	Candidate	Votes	%
ADC	Jemili Akingbade		
ADC hold			

=== Abeokuta North ===
APM candidate Modupe Mujota won the election.

2019 Ogun State House of Assembly election
Party	Candidate	Votes	%
APM	Modupe Mujota		
APM hold			

=== Abeokuta South I ===
APC candidate Adejojo Yusuf won the election.

2019 Ogun State House of Assembly election
Party	Candidate	Votes	%
APC	Adejojo Yusuf		
APC hold			

=== Abeokuta South II ===
APC candidate Adeyemi Ademuyiwa won the election.

2019 Ogun State House of Assembly election
Party	Candidate	Votes	%
APC	Adeyemi Ademuyiwa		
APC hold			

=== Ado Odo Ota I ===
APC candidate Yusuf Sherif Abiodun won the election.

2019 Ogun State House of Assembly election
Party	Candidate	Votes	%
APC	Yusuf Sherif Abiodun		
APC hold			

=== Ado Odo Ota II ===
APM candidate Lamidi Musefiu won the election.

2019 Ogun State House of Assembly election
Party	Candidate	Votes	%
APM	Lamidi Musefiu		
APM hold			

=== Yewa North I ===
ADC candidate Adegoke Olusesi won the election.

2019 Ogun State House of Assembly election
Party	Candidate	Votes	%
ADC	Adegoke Olusesi		
ADC hold			

=== Yewa North II ===
ADC candidate Haruna Abiodun won the election.

2019 Ogun State House of Assembly election
Party	Candidate	Votes	%
ADC	Haruna Abiodun		
ADC hold			

=== Yewa South ===
APM candidate Bolanle Lateefat won the election.

2019 Ogun State House of Assembly election
Party	Candidate	Votes	%
APM	Bolanle Lateefat		
APM hold			

=== Ewekoro ===
APM candidate Amosun Yusuf won the election.

2019 Ogun State House of Assembly election
Party	Candidate	Votes	%
APM	Amosun Yusuf		
APM hold			

=== Ijebu East ===
APC candidate Adams Isaac won the election.

2019 Ogun State House of Assembly election
Party	Candidate	Votes	%
APC	Adams Isaac		
APC hold			

=== Ijebu North I ===
PDP candidate Abiodun Sylvester won the election.

2019 Ogun State House of Assembly election
Party	Candidate	Votes	%
PDP	Abiodun Sylvester		
PDP hold			

=== Ijebu North East ===
APC candidate Fasuwa Abayomi won the election.

2019 Ogun State House of Assembly election
Party	Candidate	Votes	%
APC	Fasuwa Abayomi		
APC hold			

=== Ijebu Ode ===
APC candidate Oduwole Kemi won the election.

2019 Ogun State House of Assembly election
Party	Candidate	Votes	%
APC	Oduwole Kemi		
APC hold			

=== Ikenne ===
APC candidate Olakunle Sobukola won the election.

2019 Ogun State House of Assembly election
Party	Candidate	Votes	%
APC	Olakunle Sobukola		
APC hold			

=== Ipokia ===
APM candidate Sikiru Ajibola won the election.

2019 Ogun State House of Assembly election
Party	Candidate	Votes	%
APM	Sikiru Ajibola		
APM hold			

=== Obafemi Owode ===
APC candidate Soneye Kayode won the election.

2019 Ogun State House of Assembly election
Party	Candidate	Votes	%
APC	Soneye Kayode		
APC hold			

=== Odeda ===
APC candidate Elemide Oludaisi won the election.

2019 Ogun State House of Assembly election
Party	Candidate	Votes	%
APC	Oludaisi Elemide		
APC hold			

=== Odogbolu ===
APC candidate Bello Atinuke won the election.

2019 Ogun State House of Assembly election
Party	Candidate	Votes	%
APC	Bello Atinuke		
APC hold			

=== Ogun Waterside ===
APC candidate Akeem Agbolade won the election.

2019 Ogun State House of Assembly election
Party	Candidate	Votes	%
APC	Akeem Agbolade		
APC hold			

=== Remo North ===
APC candidate Osho Solomon won the election.

2019 Ogun State House of Assembly election
Party	Candidate	Votes	%
APC	Osho Solomon		
APC hold			

=== Sagamu I ===
APC candidate Abdulbashir Oladunjoye won the election.

2019 Ogun State House of Assembly election
Party	Candidate	Votes	%
APC	Abdulbashir Oladunjoye		
APC hold			

=== Sagamu II ===
APM candidate Adeniran Ademola won the election.

2019 Ogun State House of Assembly election
Party	Candidate	Votes	%
APM	Adeniran Ademola		
APM hold			
