= Ureju Community =

- Communities of Warri Kingdom
- Interactive map of Ureju Community
- Country: Nigeria
- State: Delta State
- LGA: Warri North
- Kingdom: Warri Kingdom

Government
  - Type: Community
  - Olu of Warri: Ogiame Atuwatse III
- Time zone: UTC+1 (WAT)
- Postal code: 331104
- Website: warrikingdom.org

Ureju Community is an indigenous Itsekiri rural community in the Warri Kingdom. Ureju Community is one of the aboriginal five communities that make up the Warri Kingdom before the coming of Olu Ginuwa I alongside other Itsekiri communities like Ugborodo, Ode-Itsekiri (Okotomu-Irigbo), Inorin and Omadino. It is located in the Benin River axis of Warri North Local Government Area of present-day Delta State, Nigeria. Ureju Community has two main families - Olero and Kokolo.

Like most Itsekiri communities, Ureju community has different quarters. The quarters in Ureju community are Ode Ureju, Ureju Sinsin, Olumagada, Gbetiokun, Oroke-tie and Obiale-uton.

Ureju community kept the first watch in the newly established Ghigho Aghofen created by His Royal Majesty, Ogiame Atuwatse III, the Olu of Warri Kingdom. In March 2022, Ogiame Atuwatse III visited Ureju Community as part of his promise to visit each community that plays watches the Olu of Warri Palace during the Ghigho Aghofen.

== Politics ==
It sits in the Ebrohimi ward of Warri North and Warri Federal constituency. Honourable Fred Martins is the current Member representing Warri North in the Delta State House of Assembly. Chief Hon. Thomas Ereyitomi represents Ureju Community as the House of Representatives Member for Warri Federal Constituency in the Nigerian House of Representatives.

== Popular culture ==
Ureju Community is known for dancing the Ulu Umalokun dance.

== See also ==
- Warri
