= Lateefat Bolanle Ajayi =

Nigerian politician

Hon. Lateefat Bolanle Ajayi

Deputy Speaker of the Ogun State House of Assembly
- Incumbent
- Assumed office 2019
- Governor: Dapo Abiodun
- Constituency: Yewa South

Personal details
- Born: Ogun State, Nigeria
- Party: APC
- Occupation: Teacher, politician

Lateefat Bolanle Ajayi is a Nigerian politician and retired teacher. She represents Yewa South Constituency in the Ogun State House of Assembly and has served as Deputy Speaker since 2019.

== Early life and education ==
Ajayi is from Yewa South Local Government Area of Ogun State. She earned a bachelor’s degree in political science and received additional training in governance and public administration.

== Career ==
Ajayi began her professional career in the education sector, working as a classroom teacher before becoming assistant head teacher and later head teacher.

She entered politics and was elected to the Ogun State House of Assembly as the representative for Yewa South Constituency. Within the Assembly, she serves as Deputy Speaker.
