= Iye =

Iye may refer to:

- 6413 Iye, a main-belt asteroid
- IYE, the ICAO airline designator of "Yemenia", the national airline of Yemen
- Iye Abarim, one of the places where the Israelites stopped at during the Exodus
- İye (sometimes İne or Eğe) a spirit from Turkic mythology
- Od iye (or Od iyesi), the Turkic and Mongolian spirit or deity of fire

== People ==
- Iye Mackay, 4th of Strathnaver (died 1370), a chief of the ancient Scottish clan
- Iye Roy Mackay, 10th of Strathnaver (died 1517), a chief of the ancient Scottish clan
- Iye Du Mackay, 12th of Strathnaver, a chief of the ancient Scottish clan from 1550 to 1572
- Iye Idolorusan, Nigerian ruler

== See also ==
- Ev iyesi § Meaning of iye
