= Atorongboye =

16th- and 17th-century Olu of Warri

Olu of Warri
- Reign: before 1597 – c. 1625
- Predecessor: Esigie
- Successor: Atuwatse I
- Died: c. 1625
- Burial: Ijala (royal tradition)
- Issue: Dom Domingos (Atuwatse I)
- House: House of Ginuwa
- Father: Esigie
- Religion: Catholicism

Atorongboye (known in contemporary Portuguese records as Dom Sebastião; died c. 1625) was an Olu of the Kingdom of Warri, or Iwere, in the western Niger Delta. Itsekiri royal tradition counts him as the sixth Olu and identifies him as the son and successor of Esigie.

Baptised as Sebastião while heir to the throne, Atorongboye became the first Christian Olu. He repeatedly sought Catholic priests for Warri, but disease and the difficulty of supporting them left the kingdom without resident clergy for long periods. Visiting priests travelled on Portuguese trading vessels and were permitted to support themselves by buying and selling enslaved people.

In 1600 he sent his eldest son, Domingos, to Portugal for an education intended to prepare him to promote Christianity and assist in governing Warri. Domingos remained there for more than a decade and represented his father's commercial and diplomatic interests at the Iberian court. He later succeeded Atorongboye as Atuwatse I.

== Early life, baptism and accession ==
Between 1571 and 1574, Gaspar Cão, the Augustinian bishop of São Tomé, sent a Catholic mission to Warri. According to a later episcopal account, the friar Francisco a Mater Dei gained a hearing for his preaching after cutting down a sacred tree without suffering the supernatural punishment expected to follow. He subsequently baptised the Olu's heir as Sebastião, after King Sebastian of Portugal. The capital, Ode-Itsekiri, was also given the Portuguese name City of Saint Augustine.

Itsekiri royal tradition identifies the Olu who permitted the baptism as Esigie. (Note: The surviving Portuguese records call Atorongboye Dom Sebastião or refer to him by his title as king of Oere. Fonseca notes that the matching of the rulers' Itsekiri and Portuguese names in his chronology draws on oral information supplied by Chief Ogbemi Rewane to Zora Seljan and António Olinto in the 1980s, and treats these identifications with caution.) Ayida interprets the baptism as a means of strengthening Warri's relationship with Portugal and its position in relation to neighbouring Benin.

The Augustinians appear to have withdrawn after Cão's death in 1574. A letter written that December reported that Warri's Christian king and people wanted priests but had none. Kenny suggests that the baptised prince may already have become Olu by then, although the letter does not name the king.

Atorongboye's accession date is uncertain, but he had become Olu by 1597, when Francisco de Villanova, bishop of São Tomé, reported that the reigning king of Warri was Christian. The commonly used date of 1597 is therefore a conventional starting point rather than a recorded accession. (Note: Ryder places Sebastião's accession before 1597, while Fonseca dates it to before about 1595. Ayida uses 1597–1625 in her chronology.)

== Catholic mission and Atlantic commerce ==
Missionary activity resumed after Francisco de Villanova became bishop of São Tomé in 1593. Franciscan missionaries were sent to the African coast, but disease soon reduced their numbers. In 1597 Villanova reported that the king and a substantial part of Warri's population were Christian, although the kingdom had no parish church or resident priest. He attributed the lack of clergy partly to the unhealthy climate and mosquitoes and partly to the Olu's inability to maintain European priests.

Villanova proposed that vessels trading between São Tomé and Warri should carry a priest and that the traders should pay his expenses. The priest would remain while the ship acquired its cargo, usually for about three months, and then return with it to São Tomé. The Iberian crown ordered priests to travel on the trading vessels but permitted them to support themselves by buying enslaved people in Warri and selling them elsewhere in Portuguese territories. Missionary visits were consequently tied to the voyages of ships trading in ivory and enslaved people.

== Relations with Portugal ==
At Villanova's suggestion, Atorongboye sent his eldest son, who had been baptised as Domingos, to Portugal in 1600. In a letter carried by the prince, he asked Philip II of Portugal and III of Spain to arrange an education that would prepare Domingos to assist in converting the Itsekiri to Christianity and governing the kingdom. The crown paid for his maintenance and education at religious colleges in Coimbra and Lisbon. His education was initially intended to prepare him for the priesthood, but ordination was no longer planned when he sought permission to return in 1608.

Domingos also represented his father's interests at the Iberian court. In 1607, at Atorongboye's request, he secured a royal decision allowing more Portuguese merchants to trade with Warri. He also sought missionaries and military support. The crown approved further religious assistance and instructed the governor of São Tomé to maintain friendly relations with Atorongboye, but made no commitment to military intervention.

In 1609 Atorongboye, Domingos and one of Domingos's brothers were granted the habit of the Portuguese Order of Christ. Domingos subsequently married the Portuguese noblewoman Maria Pereira and probably returned to Warri in 1611.

== Later reign ==
Atorongboye continued to request resident priests. One who had lived in Warri died shortly before 1616, and the Olu informed Pedro da Cunha, the new bishop of São Tomé, and asked for a replacement. Da Cunha initially found no priest willing to settle there permanently. The priest eventually sent intended to stay only until his ship returned to São Tomé, but remained for about a year.

Da Cunha's report of 1620 described Atorongboye as elderly but still reigning. He had chosen Domingos as his successor, and the prince was already taking a substantial part in government. During periods without priests, Atorongboye taught Christian doctrine himself and organised religious processions.

The report described Christianity as centred on Atorongboye and Domingos. It said that Christians were a minority even in Ode-Itsekiri, that there were no Christian communities outside the capital, and that many converts continued Itsekiri marriage and religious practices. Da Cunha had not visited Warri himself, although Ryder considered his general account credible.

== Death and succession ==
Atorongboye probably died around 1625 and was succeeded by Domingos, who became Olu Atuwatse I. Fonseca bases this approximate dating on an instruction issued by the Iberian crown in 1625 for the bishop of São Tomé to send two Franciscan friars to the prince of Warri, which he interprets as an indication that Atorongboye had died around that time.

According to Itsekiri royal tradition, Atorongboye was buried at Ijala, the royal burial ground, where a tree was planted to mark his grave.
