= Oludotun Taiwo =

Nigerian engineer and politician

Hon. Oludotun Taiwo

Commissioner for Forestry of Ogun State
- Incumbent
- Assumed office 2019
- Governor: Dapo Abiodun

Personal details
- Born: 25 October 1973 (age 52)
- Education: University of Lagos, Yaba College of Technology, Ladoke Akintola University of Technology
- Occupation: Engineer, public administrator, politician

Oludotun Taiwo (born 25 October 1973) is a Nigerian engineer, public administrator, and politician. He represents Abeokuta North in Ogun State and has served as the Commissioner for Forestry since 2019, retaining the position following his re‑appointment in 2023.

== Early life and education ==
Taiwo was born in Lagos State on 25 October 1973 and is a native of the Owu Kingdom in Abeokuta North, Ogun State. He attended Catholic Comprehensive Secondary School, Ibara, Abeokuta, for his secondary education. He later obtained a National Diploma in Electrical/Electronics Engineering from Ogun State Polytechnic, Ojere, and a Higher National Diploma in Electrical Power Engineering from Yaba College of Technology. He pursued a Post‑Graduate Diploma in Electrical Power Engineering at Ladoke Akintola University of Technology.

== Career ==
Taiwo undertook his industrial training with Debo Industry, Oshodi, Lagos, between 1997 and 1998. He later joined Unistar Hi‑Tech Systems Ltd., Lagos, where he worked from 2004 until 2015, serving as General Manager.

In 2019, Governor Dapo Abiodun nominated him for a commissioner role, and he was confirmed as Commissioner for Forestry by the Ogun State House of Assembly. He was re‑appointed to the same office in 2023 during the governor's second term.
