= Esigie (Olu) =

Nigerian traditional ruler

Oú Esigie
- Olú of Iwere, Ogíamè
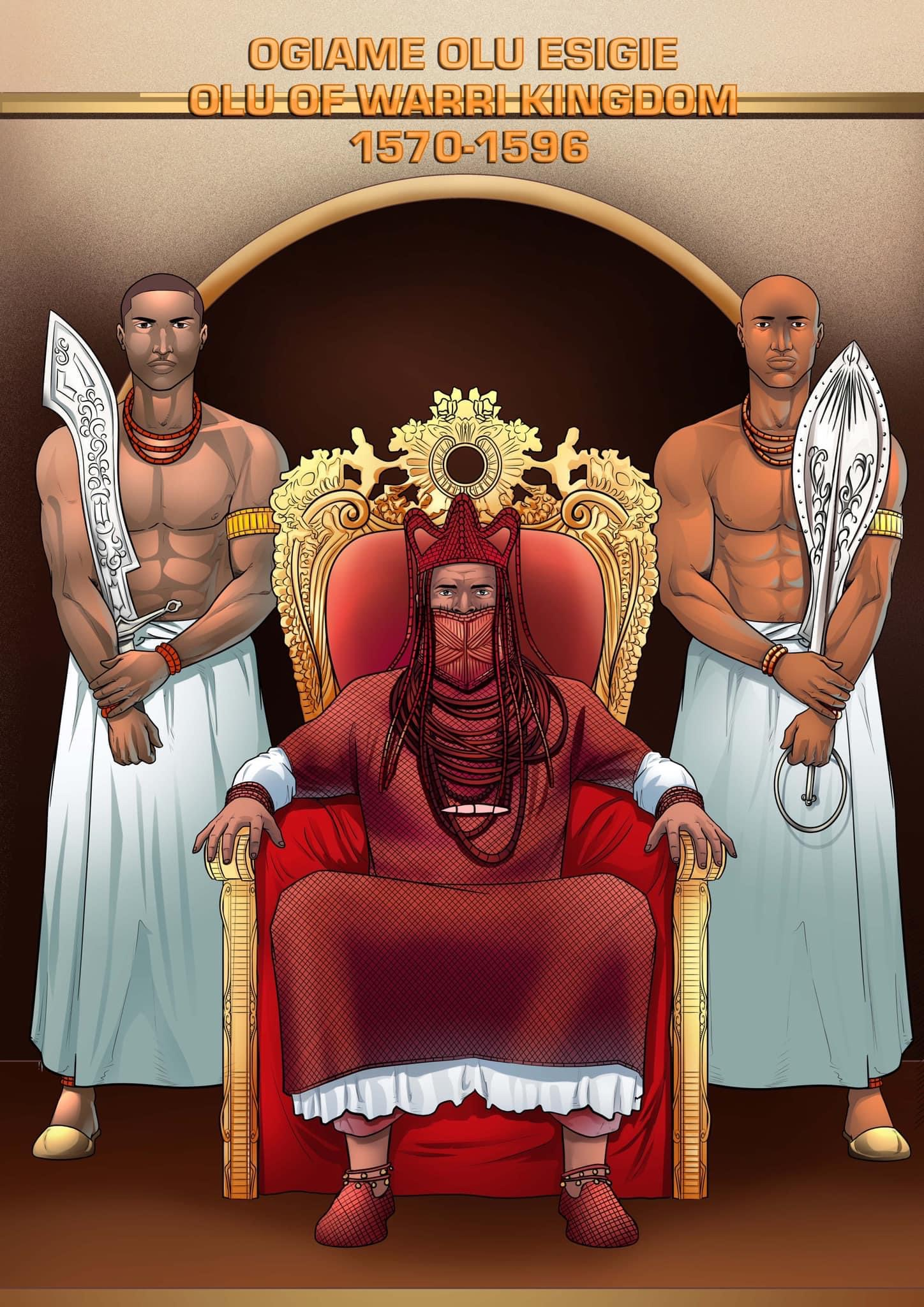

Olu of Warri
- Reign: c. 1570 – c. 1597
- Coronation: c. 1570
- Predecessor: Olu Ojoluwa
- Successor: Olu Atorongboye (Sebastian)
- Died: c. 1597; Ode-Itsekiri, Warri Kingdom
- Burial: Ijala Royal Cemetery, Warri Kingdom
- Issue: Olu Atorongboye (Sebastian)
- House: House of Ginuwa
- Father: Olu Ojoluwa
- Religion: Itsekiri traditional beliefs, Roman Catholic
- Occupation: Sovereign Monarch

Olu Esigie was an Itsekiri traditional ruler. He succeeded his father Ogiame, Olu Ojoluwa after his demise. He was crowned Ogiame Esigie, the 5th Olu of Warri Kingdom at Ode-Itsekiri, the ancestral home of the Itsekiri. He ascended the throne of his father in 1580 and reigned until 1597, when he died. He was succeeded by his son, Olu Atorongboye (Olu Sebastian).
