= Ojoluwa =

Nigerian traditional ruler

Olu Ojoluwa
- Olú of iwere, Ogíamè

Olu of Warri
- Reign: c. 1550 – c. 1569
- Coronation: c. 1550
- Predecessor: Olu Irame
- Successor: Olu Esigie
- Died: c. 1569; Ode-itsekiri, Warri Kingdom
- Burial: Ijala, Warri Kingdom
- Issue: Olu Esigie
- House: Ginuwa Ruling House
- Father: Olu Irame
- Religion: Itsekiri traditional beliefs

Olu Ojoluwa was an Itsekiri traditional ruler. He succeeded his father Ogiame, Olu Irame after his demise. He was crowned Ogiame Ojoluwa, the 4th Olu of Warri Kingdom at Ode-Itsekiri, the ancestral home of the Itsekiri. Olu Ojoluwa reigned for about nineteen years from about 1550 to 1569. During his reign, he commenced the process of integration of Ekpen's (Ekpenede) descendants of Okere with the local population in the kingdom.
