= Mafe =

Mafe may refer to:

== People ==
- Ade Mafe (born 1966), English sprinter
- Asiwaju Yinka Mafe (1974–2020), Nigerian politician
- Boye Mafe, American American football player

== Other ==
- Mafe or Peanut stew
- The MAFE Project
