= Ijijen =

Nigerian traditional ruler

Olu Ogbowuru (Ijijen)
- Olú of Warri
- Reign: 1510–1538
- Predecessor: Olu Ginuwa
- Successor: Olu Irame
- Born: c. 1482 ijalla, kingdom of Warri
- Died: 1538; Ode-Itsekiri (Big Warri), Warri Kingdom
- Burial: Ijala Royal Cemetery, Warri
- House: Ginuwa ruling house
- Father: Olu Ginuwa I
- Religion: Traditional Itsekiri beliefs
- Occupation: Traditional Ruler

Olu Ijijen (Ogbowuru) was the second Olu of Warri, succeeding his father Ogiame Olu Ginuwa. He reigned from 1510 to 1538 and was buried in Ijala. He was succeeded by his brother Olu Irame.
