= Ikwechegh =

- Gender: male
- Language: Igbo

Origin
- Origin: Nigeria
- Region of origin: South East Nigeria

Ikwechegh audio is a Nigerian surname of Igbo origin.

== Notable individuals with the name ==
- Amadi Ikwechegh (1951–2009), military governor of Imo State, Nigeria
- Alex Mascot Ikwechegh, Nigerian politician, businessman and philanthropist
- Abai Ikwechegh (1923–2020), Nigerian jurist
