= Adeleye Lukman Olalekan =

Nigerian politician

Adeleye Lukman Olalekan is a Nigerian politician. He currently serve as the Minority Leader of the Ogun State House of Assembly representing Odogbolu State Constituency of Ogun state 10th National assembly.
