= Osahon Okunbo =

Nigerian business executive

- Born: Nigeria
- Education: University of Southampton; Lagos Business School
- Occupation: Business executive
- Parent: Hosa Wells Okunbo

Osahon Hosa Okunbo is a Nigerian engineer and business executive. He is the founder and chairman of Vetrinox Capital, an investment firm, chairman of The Wells Carlton Hotel and Apartments and executive Director of Pipeline Infrastructure Nigeria Limited (PINL).

== Early life and education ==
Osahon was born to Idahosa Wells Okunbo, a commercial pilot and business executive who chaired boards of several companies across multiple sectors including aggro-allied , energy, real estate, telecoms and hospitality. Okunbo earned a bachelor’s degree in engineering from the University of Southampton, United kingdom and received executive business training at Lagos Business School.

== Career ==
Osahon is the founder and chairman of Vetrinox Capital - an investment firm with interests in energy, agriculture, infrastructure, hospitality and creative economy and chairs The Wells Carlton Hotel and Apartments. He currently serves as executive director of Pipeline Infrastructure Nigeria Limited (PINL), a pipeline infrastructure and other critical energy assets protection company.

== Arts and non-profit work ==
Okunbo established The Osahon Okunbo Foundation (TOOF), an organization supporting visual arts and cultural initiatives in Nigeria. In 2025, the foundation co-hosted an art masterclass in partnership with the Legacy Arts Foundation and the Embassy of Belgium. He also serves on the board of The Children's Art Gallery.
