= Adeniran Ademola Adeyinka =

Nigerian politician

Hon. Adeniran Ademola Adeyinka

Deputy Majority Leader of the Ogun State House of Assembly
- Incumbent
- Assumed office 2019
- Governor: Dapo Abiodun
- Constituency: Sagamu II

Personal details
- Born: 9 August 1980s Ogun State, Nigeria
- Education: Olabisi Onabanjo University
- Occupation: Lawmaker, politician

Adeniran Ademola Adeyinka (born 9 August, year not publicly stated) is a Nigerian politician and legislator. He represents Sagamu II Constituency in the Ogun State House of Assembly and serves as the Deputy Majority Leader.

== Early life and education ==
Adeyinka was born into the Opaaro house of the Koyelu royal family in Itunsokun, Offin Sagamu. He attended Mayflower Junior School, Ikenne, for his primary education and later continued at Mayflower School, Ikenne, for his secondary studies. He obtained an Ordinary National Diploma (OND) in Business Studies from the Federal Polytechnic, Ilaro. After completing the OND, he pursued a Bachelor of Science and Education degree in Economics at Olabisi Onabanjo University. He completed the National Youth Service Corps (NYSC) programme in Taraba State.

== Career ==
Adeyinka has engaged in business ventures, including operating a computer centre and a laundry service. He is also the Chief Executive Officer of Sapele Farm & Agro Networks.

In 2019, he was elected to the Ogun State House of Assembly as the representative for Sagamu II Constituency. He currently holds the position of Deputy Majority Leader in the Assembly.
