= Lukmon Olajide Atobatele =

Nigerian politician and businessperson

Hon. Lukmon Olajide Atobatele

Member, Ogun State House of Assembly
- Incumbent
- Assumed office June 2023
- Governor: Dapo Abiodun
- Constituency: Abeokuta South I

Personal details
- Born: Lagos State, Nigeria
- Education: Ladoke Akintola University of Technology
- Occupation: Businessperson, lawmaker, politician

Lukmon Olajide Atobatele is a Nigerian businessperson, lawmaker, and politician who serves as a member of the Ogun State House of Assembly, representing Abeokuta South I Constituency.

== Education ==
Atobatele attended Ogba Primary School, Ogba-Ijaye, Ikeja, Lagos State in 1988. He proceeded to Abeokuta Grammar School, Idi-Aba, Abeokuta, Ogun State, where he studied between 1989 and 1994. He later enrolled at the Ladoke Akintola University of Technology (LAUTECH), Ogbomosho, Oyo State, graduating with a B.Tech in Applied Physics in 2002. He also obtained a Master's degree in Business Administration (MBA) with a focus on Marketing Management from LAUTECH in 2004.

== Career ==
Atobatele is the Chief Executive Officer of Lukazai Nigeria Limited, a company with interests in building and construction, solid minerals exploration, and general merchandising.

He was elected to the Ogun State House of Assembly in June 2023 to represent Abeokuta South I Constituency. He also serves as the Deputy Minority Leader of the Assembly.
