= Omagboye =

Nigerian traditional ruler

Olu Omagboye (Miguel)
- Occupation: Traditional Ruler
- Years active: 1709 - 1730
- Father: Olu Akenjoye
- Website: warrikingdom.org

Olu Omagboye was the 12th Olu of Warri who ruled over the Kingdom of Warri. He succeeded his father, Olu Akenjoye as the 12th Olu of Warri. He took the title, Ogiame Omagboye. His son Olu Akengboye succeeded him.
