= Atogbuwa =

Nigerian traditional ruler

Olu Atogbuwa
- Occupation: Traditional Ruler
- Years active: 1734 - 1760
- Father: Olu Akengboye
- Website: warrikingdom.org

Olu Atogbuwa was the 14th Olu of Warri who ruled over the Kingdom of Warri. He succeeded his father, Olu Akengboye as the 14th Olu of Warri. He took the title, Ogiame Atogbuwa. His Portuguese name was Manuel Octobia. When he went to be with his fathers, he was succeeded by Olu Erejuwa I around 1760.
