= Iye Idolorusan =

Nigerian ruler (d. 1870/1875)

Iye Idolorusan, also known as Queen Dola (died between c. 1870 and 1875), was a ruler of the Itsekiri Kingdom of Warri in Nigeria from 1848.

Daughter of King Erejuwa and his wife Emaye, Iye Idolorusan had a sister, Uwala. Their father died, and their mother remarried his son from a prior marriage, Akengbuwa, with whom she had three more children, including sons Omateye and Ejo. The former was recognized as heir, but was in a rivalry with his elder half-brother Agbagba. Iye and Uwala founded the town of Batere in the event that their brother should need a refuge.

Akengbuwa died in 1848, followed closely by the deaths of his two sons in what some felt were suspicious circumstances; as a result, for three years Warri appears to have had no leader. The capital of Warris population was very limited because people decided to move to villages in the southern part of the Benin river, during which trade declined and the royal family dispersed. Iye then took control of the kingdom's affairs; not only was she a member of the royal house, she was married to Omoku, a former governor of the tributary state of Bobi. The couple had a son, Chanomi. Iye was a wealthy trader, and was joined as ruler by Ebrimoni, a senior slave formerly owned by her and her half-brother. The British, fearing further destabilization in local trading circles, appeared not to welcome Iye as queen; for her part, she, too, tried to find a suitable ruler, with no luck. Erbimoni was suggested, but the idea met with resistance among the Itsekiri. As a result, Warri lacked another king until 1937, although Iye served as a regent.

She continued to live in Bobi, while her son founded his own village. In March 1894, Commander Tudor of the Firefly visited the Benin river in response to a call from the European traders. He planned to visit Warri to see Iye but did not go; instead he signed an agreement with Diare and Idibofun, described as the chiefs Jakpa, that they should do all within their ability to protect trade in the river. These two men were clearly thought to be the most powerful in the Benin river, though apparently holding no title office. Beecroft states that Ebrimoni collected the comey from ships, paying it to Iye, suggesting that these two were considered heirs of the monarchy.
