= Akengboye =

Nigerian traditional ruler

Olu Akengboye
- Occupation: Traditional Ruler
- Years active: 1730 - 1732
- Father: Olu Omagboye (Miguel)
- Website: warrikingdom.org

Olu Akengboye was the 13th Olu of Warri who ruled over the Kingdom of Warri. He succeeded his father, Olu Omagboye (Miguel) as the 13th Olu of Warri. He took the title, Ogiame Akengboye. His Portuguese name was Agostinho Sabastiao Octobia. His son Olu Atogbuwa succeeded him around 1734.
