= Irame =

Nigerian traditional ruler

Olú Irame
- Olú of Warri, Ogíamè

Olu of Warri
- Reign: c. 1538 – c. 1570
- Coronation: c. 1538
- Predecessor: Olu Ogbowuru (Ijijen)
- Successor: Olu Ojoluwa
- Born: c. 1495; Ijala, Warri Kingdom
- Died: c. 1570; Ode-Itsekiri, Warri Kingdom
- Burial: Ijala Royal Cemetery, Warri Kingdom
- Issue: Olu Ojoluwa
- House: House of Ginuwa
- Father: Olu Ginuwa I
- Religion: Itsekiri traditional beliefs
- Occupation: Sovereign Monarch

Olu Irame was a Nigerian traditional ruler who was the 3rd Olu of Warri. He was the second son to Olu Ginuwa and succeeded his brother Olu Ogbowuru as the 3rd Olu of Warri. It is stated that he banished the three gods (Ibirikimo, Otueke, and Ike) and their worshipers from Ode-Itsekiri-Olu because of their incessant "noise-making". The gods and their worshipers moved to Orugbo, a community about 2 miles from Ode-Itsekiri-olu.
