= Oludaisi Elemide =

Speaker of the Ogun State House of Assembly

Rt Hon Oludaisi Elemide is a Nigerian politician currently serving as the speaker of the Ogun State House of Assembly. He was elected speaker of the house on 23 January 2024 following the impeachment of Olakunle Oluomo on the allegations of financial embezzlement and highhandedness against members of the assembly. Elemide, a member of the All Progressive Congress is a third term member of the assembly representing Odeda State Constituency.

Elemide was nominated for speakership by Adegoke Adeyanju of the All Progressives Congress (APC) representing Yewa North 1 and was seconded by Adeniran Ademola also of the APC representing Sagamu State Constituency II. He was unanimously elected by all 22 members present during the election. Elemide ran for the speaker of the state assembly during its inauguration in June 2023 but lost to the impeached.
