= Erejuwa I =

Nigerian traditional ruler

Olu Erejuwa I
- Occupation: Traditional Ruler
- Years active: 1760 - 1795
- Father: Olu Atogbuwa
- Website: warrikingdom.org

Olu Erejuwa was the 15th Olu of Warri who ruled over the Kingdom of Warri. He succeeded Olu Atogbuwa as the 15th Olu of Warri. He took the title, Ogiame Erejuwa I. His Portuguese name was Sebastiao Manuel Octobia. When he went to be with his fathers, he was succeeded by Olu Akengbuwa around 1795.
