= Andrew Yakubu =

Nigerian engineer (born 1955)

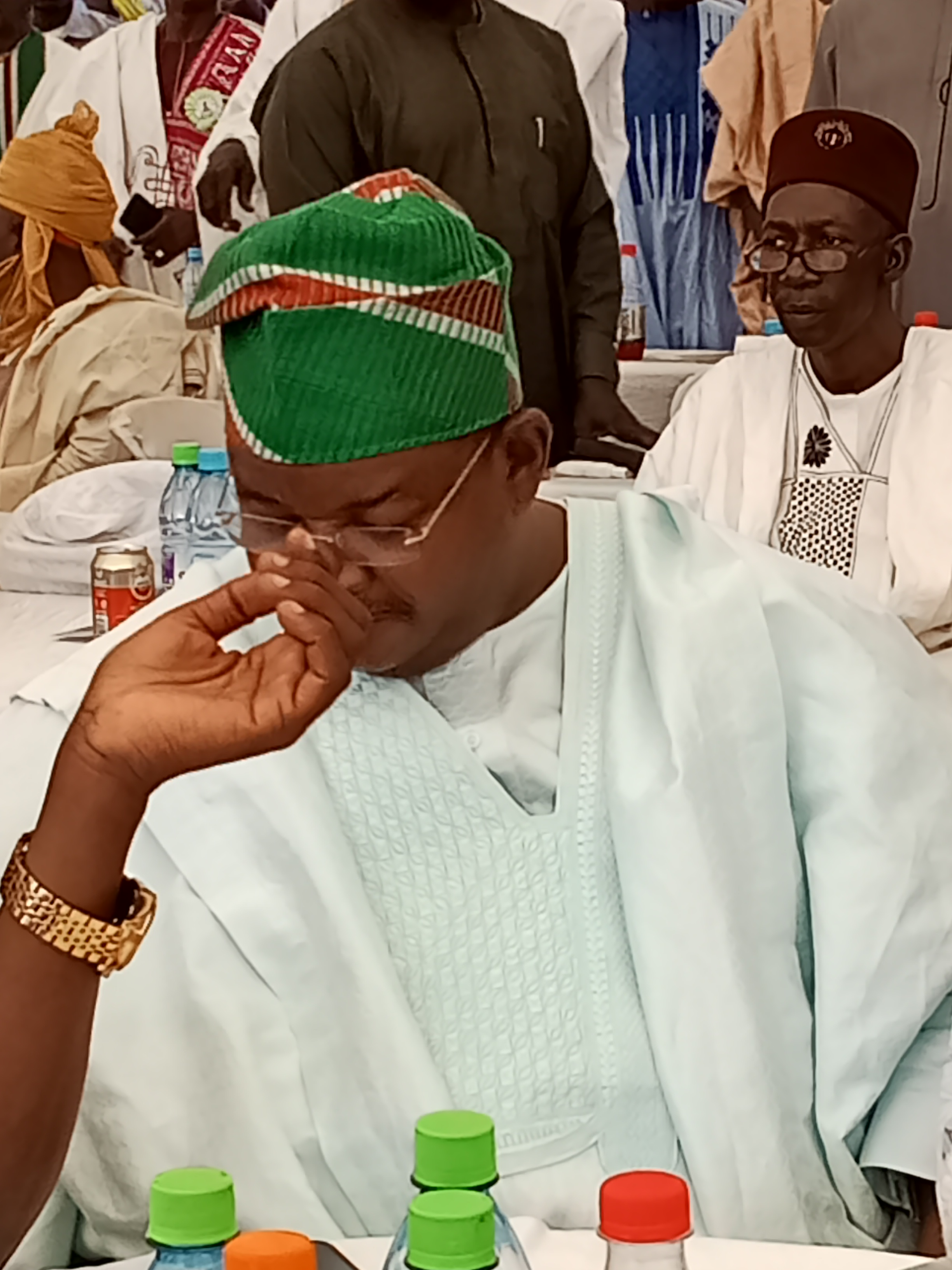
- Laah in 2023

Managing Director of the Nigerian National Petroleum Corporation
- In office 2012 – August 2014
- Succeeded by: Joseph Thlama Dawha

Personal details
- Born: September 10, 1955 (age 70)

Andrew Laah Yakubu (born 10 September 1955) is a former Group Managing Director of the Nigerian National Petroleum Corporation. He was given the appointment by President Goodluck Ebele Jonathan in 2012. He and the management team were relieved of their appointments to strengthen the on-going reforms in NNPC by ex-President Goodluck Jonathan in July 2014 and Joseph Dawha was named as his successor in August 2014.

== Life ==
Yakubu was born on September 10, 1955, in Mawukili, Northern Region (now in southern Kaduna State), Nigeria. Yakubu is a philanthropist who has contributed to various charity projects in multiple churches and organizations across Nigeria. Over the years he has continually supported the needy by way of donations, sponsorship and scholarships for the poor using his foundation. He was given the chieftaincy title "Iya A̠tyap" by the Atyap Chiefdom of Kaduna State in 2004, and is a full member of the Atyap Council of Chiefs.

== Education ==
Yakubu attended the Government College in Keffi from 1969 to 1973, obtaining a West African School Certificate. Thereafter, he attended the College of Arts and Science in Zaria until 1975, when he entered the Ahmadu Bello University there, studying chemical engineering. After graduating with a BA in 1979, he served various roles in refineries before becoming executive director of operations at NETCO in March 2005. In addition to his education in chemistry, he received a certificate in Strategy and Organization from Stanford University's Graduate School of Business Studies.

== Career ==
He left his NETCO role in December 2006 to work at the Nigerian National Petroleum Corporation, first as general manager and ultimately as managing director and CEO. He assumed the role several months after a national fuel crisis in Nigeria, when the NNPC was widely perceived as a corrupt organization, and oversaw changes within the national institution until he was removed during President Jonathan's regime on allegations of insubordination. Yakubu's intervention led to the gas supply to the Nigerian market growing from 300 million cubic feet per day (mcfpd) to 1500mcfpd, of which 70% was dedicated to support the power sector. He sustained stability in the supply and distribution of petroleum products across the country, with Nigeria's three refineries running efficiently during his tenure. He streamed Fluid Catalytic Cracking Units (FCC) in Kaduna refinery, Port Harcourt FCC was operational, while Warri refinery was also on stream through the efforts of the in-house experts he engaged.

He is a Fellow of the Nigerian Society of Engineers; Fellow of the Nigerian Society of Chemical Engineers; a Fellow of the Nigerian Association of Technologists in Engineering Associate Fellow, Chemical Society of Nigeria and a registered Engineer of the Council for the Regulation of Engineering in Nigeria COREN. He is a fellow of the Nigerian Association of Technologist in Engineering. His honors include the Presidential Merit Award by the Nigerian Society of Chemical Engineers (1997) and the GMD of NNPC Award (1987).

== Sack from The Nigerian National Petroleum Corporation ==
Yakubu was relieved from his post as the group managing director of the NNPC by President Goodluck Jonathan over perceived infighting between him and the Minister of Petroleum Diezani Alison-Madueke over whom to appoint as the managing director of Nigerian Petroleum Development Company Limited (NPDC). The Presidency on the other hand said the NNPC management team was sacked to strengthen the on-going reforms in the organization.

On 3 February 2017, a huge amount of cash (USD 9.8 Million and GBP 72,000) was found in a residence belonging to him in the city of Kaduna, Nigeria by operatives of the Economic and Financial Crimes Commission (EFCC) team. Yakubu reported to the commission's zonal office in Kano and made a statement wherein he admitted ownership of the money, claiming it was "gifts" from unnamed persons.

The anti-corruption agency, EFCC charged Yakubu to court for false declaration of assets, over the discovery of $9.8m in his Kaduna residence. He has not been found guilty by any court of law for corruption in Nigeria.

He however filed a billion Naira suit against the EFCC and the Attorney General of the Federation for damages in March 2017.

In April 2022, Andrew Yakubu was discharged and acquitted by the Federal High Court and the court ordered EFCC to return the pile of cash seized.

== Personal life ==
Yakubu is married to Sarah Yakubu with whom he has six children and nine grandchildren. He has a strong interest in the games of golf and football.
