= Omoluyiri =

Nigerian traditional ruler

Olu Omoluyiri
- Occupation: Traditional Ruler
- Years active: 1654–1674
- Father: Olu Atuwatse I (Olu Dom Domingos)
- Website: warrikingdom.org

Olu Omoluyiri was the 9th Olu of the medieval Nigerian Warri kingdom who ruled over the Itsekiri and non Itsekiri people in the kingdom. He was the brother to Olu Oyenakpagha (Olu Obanighenren), the 8th Olu of Warri Kingdom and the son to Olu Atuwatse I (Olu Dom Domingos), the 7th Olu of Warri. He succeeded his brother, Olu Oyenakpagha (Olu Obanighenren) as the 9th Olu of Warri. His Portuguese name was Mathias Ludivico. He married a Portuguese noblewoman and was succeeded by his son Olu Abejoye.

== Family and succession ==
Omoluyiri was the son of Olu Atuwatse I (Olu Dom Domingos), the 7th Olu of Warri, who was the first Olu to marry a Portuguese noblewoman and the first university graduate in Sub-Saharan Africa. He was the brother of Olu Oyenakpagha (Olu Obanighenren), the 8th Olu of Warri, and succeeded him to the throne.

== Education and reign ==
Omoluyiri was educated at home and at an institute in Angola, following a tradition of education established by his father. Like his father and brother before him, he married a Portuguese noblewoman, continuing the kingdom's close ties with Portugal that had been established through trade and missionary contact from the early 17th century.

He reigned as the 9th Olu of Warri from 1654 to 1674, a period during which the kingdom maintained its position as a significant trading and diplomatic power in the Niger Delta region. The Warri Kingdom during this era maintained sustained contact with Portuguese traders and missionaries, which shaped its institutions and culture.

== Succession ==
Omoluyiri was succeeded by his son, Olu Abejoye, who became the 10th Olu of Warri and reigned for approximately 25 years.
