= Oyenakpagha =

Nigerian traditional ruler

Olu Oyenakpagha (Olu Obanighenren)
- Occupation: Traditional Ruler
- Years active: 1643 - 1653
- Father: Olu Atuwatse I (Olu Dom Domingos)
- Website: warrikingdom.org

Olu Oyenakpagha (Olu Obanighenren) was the 8th Olu of Warri who ruled over the Itsekiri people. He was named Omonighenren which translates to Prince with the golden skin. On ascension to the throne as Ogiame, Olu of Warri Kingdom, he was named Obanighenren which translates to King with the golden skin. His other name was Don Antonio Domingos. He was the son to Olu Atuwatse I (Olu Dom Domingos) and succeeded his father as the 8th Olu of Warri. He wrote a letter to Pope Clement X in 1652 which was delivered to the Pope successfully. He was educated at home and at an institute in Angola. Like his father, he married a Portuguese noblewoman. His son Olu Omoluyiri succeeded him.
