= Nigeria national football team results (2020–present) =

This article provides details of international football games played by the Nigeria national football team from 2020 to present.

== Results ==
Key
Win
Draw
Defeat

=== 2020 ===
9 October 2020 Friendly	Nigeria	0–1	Algeria	Sankt Veit an der Glan, Austria
20:30 UTC+2		Report	Bensebaini 6'	Stadium: Jacques Lemans Arena; Referee: Manuel Schüttengruber (Austria)

13 October 2020 Friendly	Nigeria	1–1	Tunisia	Sankt Veit an der Glan, Austria
19:30 UTC+2	Iheanacho 21'	Report	Dräger 44'	Stadium: Jacques Lemans Arena; Referee: Sebastian Gishamer (Austria)

13 November 2020 2021 AFCON qualification	Nigeria	4–4	Sierra Leone	Benin City, Nigeria
17:00 UTC+1	Iwobi 4', 27'; Osimhen 21'; Chukwueze 29'	Report	Quee 41'; Kamara 72', 86'; Bundu 80'	Stadium: Samuel Ogbemudia Stadium; Referee: Gilbert Cheruiyot (Kenya)

17 November 2020 2021 AFCON qualification	Sierra Leone	0–0	Nigeria	Freetown, Sierra Leone
16:00 UTC+0		Report		Stadium: National Stadium; Referee: Mehdi Abid Charef (Algeria)

=== 2021 ===
27 March 2021 2021 AFCON qualification	Benin	0–1	Nigeria	Porto-Novo, Benin
17:00 UTC+1		Report	Onuachu 90+3'	Stadium: Stade Charles de Gaulle; Referee: Redouane Jiyed (Morocco)

30 March 2021 2021 AFCON qualification	Nigeria	3–0	Lesotho	Lagos, Nigeria
17:00 UTC+1	Osimhen 23'; Etebo 50'; Onuachu 83'	Report		Stadium: Teslim Balogun Stadium; Referee: Fabricio Duarte (Cape Verde)

4 June 2021 Friendly	Nigeria	0–1	Cameroon	Wiener Neustadt, Austria
21:30 UTC+2		Report	Zambo Anguissa 37'	Stadium: Stadion Wiener Neustadt; Attendance: 0 Referee: Harald Lechner (Austria)

8 June 2021 Friendly	Cameroon	0–0	Nigeria	Wiener Neustadt, Austria
18:00 UTC+2		Report		Stadium: Stadion Wiener Neustadt; Attendance: 0 Referee: Manuel Schüttengruber (Austria)

3 July 2021 Friendly	Mexico	4–0	Nigeria	Los Angeles, United States
20:00 UTC−7	Herrera 2', 52'; Funes Mori 4'; Dos Santos 78'	Report		Stadium: Los Angeles Memorial Coliseum; Referee: Oliver Vergara (Panama)

3 September 2021 2022 World Cup qualification	Nigeria	2–0	Liberia	Lagos, Nigeria
17:00 UTC+1	Iheanacho 22', 44'	Report		Stadium: Teslim Balogun Stadium; Referee: Kouassi Attisso Attiogbe (Togo)

7 September 2021 2022 World Cup qualification	Cape Verde	1–2	Nigeria	Mindelo, Cape Verde
15:00 UTC−1	D. Tavares 19'	Report	Osimhen 30'; Rocha 76' (o.g.)	Stadium: Estádio Municipal Adérito Sena; Referee: Samir Guezzaz (Morocco)

7 October 2021 2022 World Cup qualification	Nigeria	0–1	Central African Republic	Lagos, Nigeria
17:00 UTC+1		Report	Namnganda 90+1'	Stadium: Teslim Balogun Stadium; Referee: Abdelaziz Bouh (Mauritania)

10 October 2021 2022 World Cup qualification	Central African Republic	0–2	Nigeria	Limbe, Cameroon
14:00 UTC+1		Report	Balogun 29'; Osimhen 45+1'	Stadium: Limbe Stadium; Referee: Louis Hakizimana (Rwanda)

13 November 2021 2022 World Cup qualification	Liberia	0–2	Nigeria	Tangiers, Morocco
17:00 UTC+1		Report	Osimhen 15' (pen.); Musa 90+4' (pen.)	Stadium: Stade Ibn Batouta; Referee: Youssef Essrayri (Tunisia)

16 November 2021 2022 World Cup qualification	Nigeria	1–1	Cape Verde	Lagos, Nigeria
17:00 UTC+1	Osimhen 1'	Report	Stopira 5'	Stadium: Teslim Balogun Stadium; Referee: Mustapha Ghorbal (Algeria)

=== 2022 ===
11 January 2022 2021 AFCON GS	Nigeria	1–0	Egypt	Garoua, Cameroon
17:00 UTC+1	Iheanacho 30'	Report		Stadium: Roumdé Adjia Stadium; Referee: Bakary Gassama (Gambia)

15 January 2022 2021 AFCON GS	Nigeria	3–1	Sudan	Garoua, Cameroon
17:00 UTC+1	Chukwueze 3'; Awoniyi 45'; Simon 46'	Report	Khedr 70' (pen.)	Stadium: Roumdé Adjia Stadium; Referee: Victor Gomes (South Africa)

19 January 2022 2021 AFCON GS	Guinea-Bissau	0–2	Nigeria	Garoua, Cameroon
20:00 UTC+1		Report	Sadiq 56'; Troost-Ekong 75'	Stadium: Roumdé Adjia Stadium; Referee: Peter Waweru (Kenya)

23 January 2022 2021 AFCON R16	Nigeria	0–1	Tunisia	Garoua, Cameroon
20:00 UTC+1		Report	Msakni 47'	Stadium: Roumdé Adjia Stadium; Referee: Maguette N'Diaye (Senegal)

25 March 2022 2022 World Cup qualification	Ghana	0–0	Nigeria	Kumasi, Ghana
19:30 UTC+0		Report		Stadium: Baba Yara Stadium; Referee: Redouane Jiyed (Morocco)

29 March 2022 2022 World Cup qualification	Nigeria	1–1 (1–1 (a) agg.)	Ghana	Abuja, Nigeria
18:00 UTC+1	Troost-Ekong 22' (pen.)	Report	Partey 10'	Stadium: Moshood Abiola National Stadium; Referee: Sadok Selmi (Tunisia)

28 May 2022 Friendly	Mexico	2–1	Nigeria	Arlington, United States
19:08 UTC−5	Giménez 12'; Troost-Ekong 56' (o.g.)	Report	Dessers 54'	Stadium: AT&T Stadium; Referee: José Torres (Puerto Rico)

2 June 2022 Friendly	Ecuador	1–0	Nigeria	Chicago, United States
18:30 UTC−5	Estupiñán 3'	Report		Stadium: Soldier Field; Referee: Ricardo Montero (Costa Rica)

9 June 2022 2023 AFCON qualification	Nigeria	2–1	Sierra Leone	Abuja, Nigeria
17:00 UTC+1	Iwobi 16'; Osimhen 41'	Report	Morsay 11'	Stadium: Moshood Abiola National Stadium; Referee: Ibrahim Kalilou Traore (Ivory Coast)

13 June 2022 2023 AFCON qualification	São Tomé and Príncipe	0–10	Nigeria	Agadir, Morocco
14:00 UTC+1		Report	Osimhen 9', 48', 65', 84'; Simon 28'; Moffi 43', 60'; Etebo 55'; Lookman 63'; Dennis 90+2' (pen.)	Stadium: Stade Adrar; Referee: Osiase Koto (Lesotho)

27 September 2022 Friendly	Algeria	2–1	Nigeria	Oran, Algeria
20:00 UTC+1	Mahrez 42' (pen.); Atal 61'	Report	Moffi 9'	Stadium: Olympic Stadium; Referee: Mehrez Melki (Tunisia)

9 November 2022 Friendly	Costa Rica	2–0	Nigeria	San José, Costa Rica
	Duarte 7'; Waston 73'	Report		Stadium: Estadio Nacional; Referee: Fernando Hernández Gómez (Mexico)

17 November 2022 Friendly	Portugal	4–0	Nigeria	Lisbon, Portugal
19:45 UTC+0	Fernandes 9', 35' (pen.); Ramos 82'; João Mário 84'	Report		Stadium: Estádio José Alvalade; Attendance: 43,621; Referee: Chrysovalantis Theouli (Cyprus)

=== 2023 ===
24 March 2023 2023 AFCON qualification	Nigeria	0–1	Guinea-Bissau	Abuja, Nigeria
17:00 UTC+1		Report	M. Baldé 29'	Stadium: Moshood Abiola National Stadium; Referee: Mahmoud El Banna (Egypt)

27 March 2023 2023 AFCON qualification	Guinea-Bissau	0–1	Nigeria	Bissau, Guinea-Bissau
16:00 UTC+0		Report	Simon 30' (pen.)	Stadium: Estádio 24 de Setembro; Referee: Samir Guezzaz (Morocco)

18 June 2023 2023 AFCON qualification	Sierra Leone	2–3	Nigeria	Monrovia, Liberia
16:00 UTC+0	Bundu 41'; Kargbo 84'	Report	Osimhen 19', 32'; Iheanacho 90+5'	Stadium: Samuel Kanyon Doe Sports Complex; Referee: Mahmood Ismail (Sudan)

10 September 2023 2023 AFCON qualification	Nigeria	6–0	São Tomé and Príncipe	Uyo, Nigeria
17:00 UTC+1	Osimhen 13', 69' (pen.), 79'; Lookman 27'; Awoniyi 51'; Chukwueze 84'	Report		Stadium: Godswill Akpabio International Stadium; Referee: Lahlou Benbraham (Algeria)

13 October 2023 Friendly	Saudi Arabia	2–2	Nigeria	Portimão, Portugal
17:00 UTC+1	Al-Faraj 60'; Kanno 90+10'	Report	Al-Amri 73' (o.g.); Iheanacho 81'	Stadium: Estádio Municipal de Portimão; Attendance: 200; Referee: Luís Godinho (Portugal)

16 October 2023 Friendly	Mozambique	2–3	Nigeria	Albufeira, Portugal
17:00 UTC+1	Catamo 6'; Bangal 55'	Report	Moffi 19'; Onyeka 30'; Simon 45+3' (pen.)	Stadium: Venue Estádio Municipal de Albufeira; Attendance: 97; Referee: Miguel Nogueira (Portugal)

16 November 2023 2026 World Cup qualification	Nigeria	1–1	Lesotho	Uyo, Nigeria
16:00	Ajayi 67'	Report	Mkhwanazi 56'	Stadium: Godswill Akpabio International Stadium; Attendance: 30,500; Referee: Mehrez Melki (Tunisia)

19 November 2023 2026 World Cup qualification	Zimbabwe	1–1	Nigeria	Butare, Rwanda
17:00	Musona 26'	Report	Iheanacho 67'	Stadium: Stade Huye; Attendance: 15,650; Referee: Souleiman Ahmed Djama (Djibouti)

=== 2024 ===
8 January 2024 Friendly	Guinea	2–0	Nigeria	Abu Dhabi, United Arab Emirates
16:00 UTC+4	Ag. Camara 15'; F. Conté 65'	Report		Stadium: Baniyas Stadium

14 January 2024 2023 AFCON GS	Nigeria	1–1	Equatorial Guinea	Abidjan, Ivory Coast
14:00	Osimhen 38'	Report	Salvador 36'	Stadium: Alassane Ouattara Stadium; Attendance: 8,500; Referee: Abongile Tom (South Africa)

18 January 2024 2023 AFCON GS	Ivory Coast	0–1	Nigeria	Abidjan, Ivory Coast
17:00		Report	Troost-Ekong 55' (pen.)	Stadium: Alassane Ouattara Stadium; Attendance: 49,517; Referee: Mustapha Ghorbal (Algeria)

22 January 2024 2023 AFCON GS	Guinea-Bissau	0–1	Nigeria	Abidjan, Ivory Coast
17:00		Report	Sanganté 36' (o.g.)	Stadium: Felix Houphouet Boigny Stadium; Attendance: 15,650; Referee: Bouchra Karboubi (Morocco)

27 January 2024 2023 AFCON R16	Nigeria	2–0	Cameroon	Abidjan, Ivory Coast
20:00	Lookman 36', 90'	Report		Stadium: Felix Houphouet Boigny Stadium; Attendance: 22,085; Referee: Redouane Jiyed (Morocco)

2 February 2024 2023 AFCON QF	Nigeria	1–0	Angola	Abidjan, Ivory Coast
17:00	Lookman 41'	Report		Stadium: Felix Houphouet Boigny Stadium; Attendance: 18,757; Referee: Issa Sy (Senegal)

7 February 2024 2023 AFCON SF	Nigeria	1–1 (a.e.t.) (4–2 p)	South Africa	Bouaké, Ivory Coast
17:00	Troost-Ekong 67' (pen.)	Report	Mokoena 90' (pen.)	Stadium: Stade de la Paix; Attendance: 31,227; Referee: Amin Omar (Egypt)
	Penalties
	Moffi (penalty scored); Omeruo (penalty scored); Aina (penalty missed); Troost-Ekong (penalty scored); Iheanacho (penalty scored)		(penalty missed) Mokoena; (penalty scored) Mayambela; (penalty missed) Makgopa; (penalty scored) Mvala

11 February 2024 2023 AFCON F	Nigeria	1–2	Ivory Coast	Abidjan, Ivory Coast
20:00	Troost-Ekong 38'	Report	Kessié 62'; Haller 81'	Stadium: Alassane Ouattara Stadium; Attendance: 57,094; Referee: Dahane Beida (Mauritania)

22 March 2024 Friendly	Nigeria	2–1	Ghana	Marrakesh, Morocco
15:00 UTC+0	Dessers 38' (pen.); Lookman 84'	Report	Ayew 90+5' (pen.)	Stadium: Marrakesh Stadium; Referee: Rédouane Jiyed (Morocco)

26 March 2024 Friendly	Nigeria	0–2	Mali	Marrakesh, Morocco
19:00 UTC+0		Report	Touré 18'; K. Doumbia 87'	Stadium: Marrakesh Stadium; Referee: Samir Guezzaz (Morocco)

7 June 2024 2026 World Cup qualification	Nigeria	1–1	South Africa	Uyo, Nigeria
20:00 UTC+1	Dele-Bashiru 46'	Report	Zwane 29'	Stadium: Godswill Akpabio International Stadium; Referee: Alhadi Allaou Mahamat (Chad)

10 June 2024 2026 World Cup qualification	Benin	2–1	Nigeria	Abidjan, Ivory Coast
16:00 UTC+0	J. Dossou 37'; Mounié 45+3'	Report	Onyedika 27'	Stadium: Felix Houphouet Boigny Stadium; Attendance: 9,000; Referee: Pierre Atcho (Gabon)

7 September 2024 2025 AFCON qualification	Nigeria	3–0	Benin	Uyo, Nigeria
17:00 UTC+1	Lookman 45+2', 83'; Osimhen 78'	Report		Stadium: Godswill Akpabio International Stadium; Referee: Alamin Alhadi Mohamed (Sudan)

10 September 2024 2025 AFCON qualification	Rwanda	0–0	Nigeria	Kigali, Rwanda
17:00 UTC+2		Report		Stadium: Amahoro Stadium; Referee: Karim Sabry (Morocco)

11 October 2024 2025 AFCON qualification	Nigeria	1–0	Libya	Uyo, Nigeria
17:00 UTC+1	Dele-Bashiru 86'	Report		Stadium: Godswill Akpabio International Stadium; Referee: Godfrey Nkhakananga (Malawi)

15 October 2024 2025 AFCON qualification	Libya	0–3; Awarded (Note: The Libya v Nigeria match, originally scheduled for 15 October 2024, was cancelled after the Nigerian team was allegedly left stranded at Al Abraq International Airport for more than 12 hours upon arrival, two days before the match. This led the Nigeria Football Federation to refuse to play and send their team back home. CAF later confirmed that the match would not take place and stated that a decision regarding its outcome would be made. On 26 October, CAF announced that Nigeria were awarded a 3–0 walkover win, and applied fines against Libya.)	Nigeria	Benghazi, Libya
21:00 UTC+2				Stadium: Martyrs of February Stadium; Referee: Lenine Rocha (Cape Verde)
Note: The Libya v Nigeria match, originally scheduled for 15 October 2024, was cancelled after the Nigerian team was allegedly left stranded at Al Abraq International Airport for more than 12 hours upon arrival, two days before the match. This led the Nigeria Football Federation to refuse to play and send their team back home. CAF later confirmed that the match would not take place and stated that a decision regarding its outcome would be made.

14 November 2024 2025 AFCON qualification	Benin	1–1	Nigeria	Abidjan, Ivory Coast
18:00 UTC+0	Tijani 16'	Report	Osimhen 81'	Stadium: Felix Houphouet Boigny Stadium; Referee: Issa Sy (Senegal)

18 November 2024 2025 AFCON qualification	Nigeria	1–2	Rwanda	Uyo, Nigeria
16:00 UTC+1	Chukwueze 59'	Report	Mutsinzi 72'; Nshuti 75'	Stadium: Godswill Akpabio International Stadium; Referee: Samir Guezzaz (Morocco)

=== 2025 ===
21 March 2025 2026 World Cup qualification	Rwanda	0–2	Nigeria	Kigali, Rwanda
17:00 UTC+1		Report	Osimhen 11', 45+3'	Stadium: Stade Amahoro; Referee: Jalal Jayed (Morocco)

25 March 2025 2026 World Cup qualification	Nigeria	1–1	Zimbabwe	Uyo, Nigeria
17:00 UTC+1	Osimhen 74'	Report (FIFA); Report (CAF)	Chirewa 90'	Stadium: Godswill Akpabio International Stadium; Referee: Tsegay Mogos Teklu (Eritrea)

28 May 2025 2025 Unity Cup SF	Nigeria	2–1	Ghana	London, England
19:45 UTC+1	Dessers 14'; Simpson 19' (o.g.)	Report	Thomas-Asante 70'	Stadium: Brentford Community Stadium; Referee: Stuart Attwell (England)

31 May 2025 2025 Unity Cup F	Nigeria	2–2 (5–4 p)	Jamaica	London, England
17:00 UTC+1	Simon 9'; Chukwueze 53'	Report	Dixon 12'; Russell 63'	Stadium: Brentford Community Stadium; Referee: Stuart Attwell (England)
	Penalties
	Iheanacho (penalty scored); Simon (penalty scored); Arokodare (penalty scored); Onyemaechi (penalty scored); Uche (penalty scored)		(penalty scored) King; (penalty scored) Hayden; (penalty scored) Morrison; (penalty missed) Atkinson; (penalty scored) Bell

6 June 2025 Friendly	Russia	1–1	Nigeria	Moscow, Russia
20:00 UTC+3	Ajayi 27' (o.g.)	Report	Arokodare 71'	Stadium: Luzhniki Stadium; Attendance: 45,638; Referee: Aliyar Aghayev (Azerbaijan)

6 September 2025 2026 World Cup qualification	Nigeria	1–0	Rwanda	Uyo, Nigeria
17:00 UTC+1	Arokodare 51'	Report		Stadium: Godswill Akpabio International Stadium; Referee: Alhadi Allaou Mahamat (Chad)

9 September 2025 2026 World Cup qualification	South Africa	1–1	Nigeria	Blomfontein, South Africa
18:00 UTC+2	Troost-Ekong 25' (o.g.)	Report	Bassey 44'	Stadium: Free State Stadium; Referee: Pierre Atcho (Gabon)

10 October 2025 2026 World Cup qualification	Lesotho	1–2	Nigeria	Polokwane, South Africa
18:00 UTC+2	Kalake 83'	Report	Troost-Ekong 55' (pen.); Adams 80'	Stadium: Peter Mokaba Stadium; Referee: Alhadi Allaou Mahamat (Chad)

14 October 2025 2026 World Cup qualification	Nigeria	4–0	Benin	Uyo, Nigeria
17:00 UTC+1	Osimhen 3', 37', 51'; Onyeka 90+1'			Stadium: Godswill Akpabio International Stadium; Referee: Amin Omar (Egypt)

13 November 2025 2026 World Cup qualification	Nigeria	4–1 (a.e.t.)	Gabon	Rabat, Morocco
17:00 UTC+1	Adams 78'; Ejuke 97'; Osimhen 102', 110'	Report	M. Lemina 89'	Stadium: Moulay El Hassan Stadium; Referee: Abongile Tom (South Africa)

16 November 2025 2026 World Cup qualification	Nigeria	1–1 (a.e.t.) (3–4 p)	DR Congo	Rabat, Morocco
20:00 UTC+1	Onyeka 3'	Report	Elia 32'	Stadium: Moulay Hassan Stadium; Referee: Jalal Jayed (Morocco)
	Penalties
	Bassey (penalty missed); Simon (penalty missed); Adams (penalty scored); Onyemaechi (penalty scored); Ejuke (penalty scored); Ajayi (penalty missed)		(penalty missed) Moutoussamy; (penalty scored) Sadiki; (penalty missed) Tuanzebe; (penalty scored) Mayele; (penalty scored) Balikwisha; (penalty scored) Mbemba

16 December 2025 Friendly	Egypt	2–1	Nigeria	Cairo, Egypt
20:00 UTC+2	Saber 28'; M. Mohamed 53'	Report	Awaziem 45+3'	Stadium: Cairo International Stadium; Referee: Mahmoud Nagy (Egypt)

23 December 2025 2025 AFCON GS	Nigeria	2–1	Tanzania	Fez, Morocco
18:30 UTC+1	Ajayi 36'; Lookman 52'	Report	M'Mombwa 50'	Stadium: Fez Stadium; Attendance: 11,444; Referee: Dahane Beida (Mauritania)

27 December 2025 2025 AFCON GS	Nigeria	3–2	Tunisia	Fez, Morocco
21:00 UTC+1	Osimhen 44'; Ndidi 50'; Lookman 67'	Report	Talbi 74'; Abdi 87' (pen.)	Stadium: Fez Stadium; Attendance: 25,544; Referee: Boubou Traore (Mali)

30 December 2025 2025 AFCON GS	Uganda	1–3	Nigeria	Fez, Morocco
18:00 UTC+1	Mato 75'	Report	Onuachu 28'; Onyedika 62', 67'	Stadium: Fez Stadium; Attendance: 11,545; Referee: Djindo Houngnandande (Benin)

=== 2026 ===
5 January 2026 2025 AFCON R16	Nigeria	4–0	Mozambique	Fez, Morocco
20:00 UTC+1	Lookman 20'; Osimhen 25', 47'; Adams 75'	Report		Stadium: Fez Stadium; Attendance: 14,593; Referee: Abdou Abdel Mefire (Cameroon)

10 January 2026 2025 AFCON QF	Algeria	0–2	Nigeria	Marrakesh, Morocco
17:00 UTC+1		Report	Osimhen 47'; Adams 57'	Stadium: Marrakesh Stadium; Attendance: 32,452; Referee: Issa Sy (Senegal)

14 January 2026 2025 AFCON SF	Nigeria	0–0 (a.e.t.) (2–4 p)	Morocco	Rabat, Morocco
21:00 UTC+1		Report		Stadium: Prince Moulay Abdellah Stadium; Attendance: 65,458; Referee: Daniel Nii Laryea (Ghana)
	Penalties
	Onuachu (penalty scored); Chukwueze (penalty missed); Dele-Bashiru (penalty scored); Onyemaechi (penalty missed)		(penalty scored) El Aynaoui; (penalty missed) Igamane; (penalty scored) Ben Seghir; (penalty scored) Hakimi; (penalty scored) En-Nesyri

17 January 2026 2025 AFCON 3rd	Egypt	0–0 (2–4 p)	Nigeria	Casablanca, Morocco
17:00 UTC+1		Report		Stadium: Mohammed V Stadium; Attendance: 38,113; Referee: Jalal Jayed (Morocco)
	Penalties
	Salah (penalty missed); Marmoush (penalty missed); Rabia (penalty scored); Saber (penalty scored)		(penalty missed) Dele-Bashiru; (penalty scored) Adams; (penalty scored) Simon; (penalty scored) Iwobi; (penalty scored) Lookman

27 March 2026 2026 Jordan International Tournament	Iran	1–2	Nigeria	Antalya, Turkey (Note: The four nation tournament between Jordan, Iran, Nigeria, and Costa Rica were moved from Amman, Jordan to Antalya, Turkey due to the travel restrictions from the 2026 Iran war.)
16:00 UTC+3	Taremi 67'	Report	Simon 7'; Adams 51'	Stadium: Corendon Airlines Park; Attendance: 0 Referee: Cihan Aydın (Turkey)

31 March 2026 2026 Jordan International Tournament	Jordan	2–2	Nigeria	Antalya, Turkey
20:30 UTC+3	Al-Taamari 17'; Al-Dawoud 77'	Report	Simon 25'; Fernandez 41'	Stadium: Mardan Sports Complex; Attendance: 0 Referee: Atilla Karaoğlan (Turkey)

26 May 2026 2026 Unity Cup SF	Nigeria	2–0	Zimbabwe	London, England
19:30 UTC+1	Azeez 5', 63'	Report		Stadium: The Valley; Referee: John Brooks (England)

30 May 2026 2026 Unity Cup F	Nigeria	3–0	Jamaica	London, England
19:30 UTC+1	Yusuf 3', 90+1'; Moffi 59'	Report		Stadium: The Valley; Referee: Sam Barrott (England)

3 June 2026 Friendly	Poland	2–2	Nigeria	Warsaw, Poland
20:45 UTC+2	Potulski 45+1'; Wiśniewski 90+5'	Report	Moffi 23'; Onuachu 77' (pen.)	Stadium: Stadion Narodowy; Attendance: 54,408; Referee: Marian Barbu (Romania)

10 June 2026 Friendly	Portugal	2−1	Nigeria	Leiria, Portugal
20:45 UTC+1	Neto 23'; Conceição 75'	Report	Adams 37'	Stadium: Estádio Dr. Magalhães Pessoa; Attendance: 21,049; Referee: Mateo Busquets Ferrer (Spain)
