= Erejuwa II =

Nigerian traditional ruler (born c. 1908)

Olu Erejuwa II
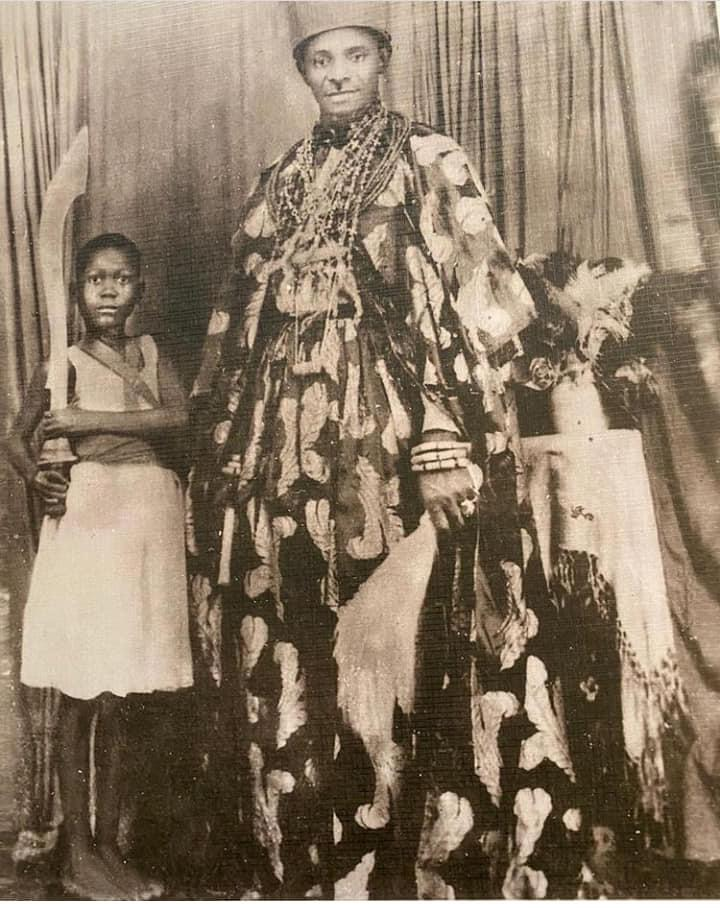
- Born: c. 1908; Nigeria
- Occupation: Traditional ruler
- Years active: 1951–1986
- Father: Olu Ginuwa II
- Website: warrikingdom.org

Erejuwa II was a Nigerian traditional title holder and paramount leader of the Itsekiri who was Olu of Warri from 1951 to 1964 and from 1966 to 1986. He was the 18th Olu of Warri Kingdom with the title Ogiame Erejuwa II. He succeeded his father Ginuwa II as Olu. Ginuwa II was a great grandson of Olu Akengbuwa the last Olu who died in 1848, he was crowned in 1936 after an interregnum that lasted 88 years when Warri's political leadership was dominated by merchant princes.

Erejuwa was born c. 1908 as Wilson Gbesimi Emiko, he attended a CMS missionary school at Ogbesse, thereafter he did business with United African Company rising to become a provincial cooperatives president. Warri was the capital township of Warri Province, a colonial administrative unit with Warri Division as a sub-unit consisting of Warri Township, Sapele and Forcados.

As Olu of Warri, he was appointed regional Minister without portfolio and president of the Warri Divisional Traditional Council. Following unhealthy rivalry between prominent Itsekiri leaders in the Action Group and the NCNC in the lead to the creation of a Mid-West region, Erejuwa, who perceived to have backed Action Group, was deposed by the NCNC led regional government in 1964 and deported to Ogbesse. He was re-appointed in 1966 by the new military government of David Ejoor after some of the prominent Itsekiri leaders in the NCNC had been taken out by the emerging military government.
