= Hosa Wells Okunbo =

Nigerian business magnate (1958–2021)

Chief Hosa Okunbo
- Born: Idahosa Wells Okunbo; 7 January 1958; Benin City, Edo State, Nigeria
- Died: 8 August 2021 (aged 63); London, England
- Occupation: Business magnate
- Years active: 1983–2021
- Children: Ivie Atuwatse III (daughter)
- Relatives: Ogiame Atuwatse III (son-in-law)

Idahosa "Hosa" Wells Okunbo (7 January 1958 – 8 August 2021) was a Nigerian business magnate, investor, philanthropist, and trained commercial pilot. He served as chairman and director on the boards of numerous companies in Nigeria, spanning multiple sectors such as the agro-allied, oil and gas, real estate, power and telecoms.

== Background and education ==
Hosa Okunbo was a native of Edo State in the southern part of Nigeria. He was born in Benin City to the family of Reverend Robert Amos Okunbo, a clergyman, teacher, and community leader. Okunbo had his primary education at Government Primary school in Benin City, old Bendel State, now Edo State. He proceeded to Federal Government College, Warri, in 1971, where he sat for West African Senior School Certificate Examination. Okunbo was a native speaker of the Edo language, and a fluent speaker of English.

Okunbo pursued a desire to become a pilot by studying at the Nigerian Civil Aviation Training Centre, Zaria, Kaduna State, and became a professional commercial pilot at the age of 21. He also attended ACME School of Aeronautics in Fort Worth, Texas in 1983, where he obtained an Airline Transport Pilot License.

== Career ==
Upon graduation, Okunbo became a professional commercial pilot, and was made a captain in 1983 at the age of 25. He was a flight captain with Intercontinental Airlines for about two years, then was employed by Okada Airlines for three years. In 1988, he retired from piloting at the age of 30, having logged over 7,000 hours of flight time, and ventured into private business.

Okunbo established Hoslyn Ventures Nigeria Ltd., a company that was involved with procurement in the Nigerian petroleum sector.

Okunbo was the founder and chairman of the following Nigerian companies:

- CMES-OMS Petroleum Development Company (CPDC), which, in September 2019, signed "$875.75m alternative financing deal for the Nigerian Petroleum Development Company (NPDC) operated OML 65".
- The Wells Carlton Hotel and Apartments, Abuja
- Wells San-Carlos Agro Farms Ltd., which, in March 2016, unveiled a $750 million, 9,000-hectare (22,000-acre) farm intended to "create 85,000 jobs in Edo State".
- Ocean Marine Security Ltd., an offshore asset-protection company, rendering services to major oil companies in Nigeria, including NNPC. The company recently completed the building of the 46-kilometre (29 mi) Escravos–Warri Crude Pipeline, which was inaugurated by Nigeria's Minister of State for Petroleum, Emmanuel Ibe Kachikwu.
- Westminster Security Solutions Nigeria Ltd, a franchise of Westminster Group Plc UK, of which he was major shareholder.
- Wells Group of companies, which include Wells Dredging Ltd., Wells Property Development Company Ltd., and Wells Entertainments Ltd. – through which Okunbo financed the movie Black November.
- Ocean Marine Solutions Tankers Ltd., which owns Nigeria's first marine tankers.
- Hoslyn Habitat Ltd., which is a design, construction and landscaping company.
- Gyro Air Ltd., operators of charter flight operations.

Okunbo was a director in the following companies:

- Joint Marine Environ Guard Ltd. (JMEG)
- Secure Anchorage Area Ltd. (SAA)
- Digisteel Integrated Services Ltd.
- Phil Nugent Nigeria Ltd.
- Integrated Energy Distribution and Marketing Ltd. (IEDM), which is a core investor in Ibadan and Yola Electricity Distribution Companies.

Okunbo was member of the Board of Directors of NatCom Development and Investment Ltd., which is the holding company of Nigerian telecommunications giant NTEL.

== Honours and recognition ==
On Saturday, 21 September 2019, in Geneva, Switzerland, Okunbo was bestowed with the Global Peace Award from the chairman of the Order of Lafayette Awards, "in recognition of his efforts in global peace and business innovations." In March 2017, he received Businessman of the Year award at the '2016 Vanguard Personality of Year Awards'. Okunbo received the Africa Titans Award in 2012, from the Congress of the United States in collaboration with the African Society Summit, in recognition of "strides on behalf of Africa in the international arena."

In November 2012, the University of Benin conferred Okunbo with an honorary Doctor of Science degree.

On 2 October 2014, the traditional ruler of the Bini people in Edo State, Oba Erediauwa, gifted Okunbo with the traditional beads of the ancient Kingdom."

== Personal life ==
Okunbo was married to Evelyn E. Okunbo, and had 12 children including Olori Atuwatse III.

=== Death ===
He died of cancer on 8 August 2021, at a hospital in London. He was aged 63.
