= Ginuwa II =

Nigerian traditional ruler

Olu Ginuwa II
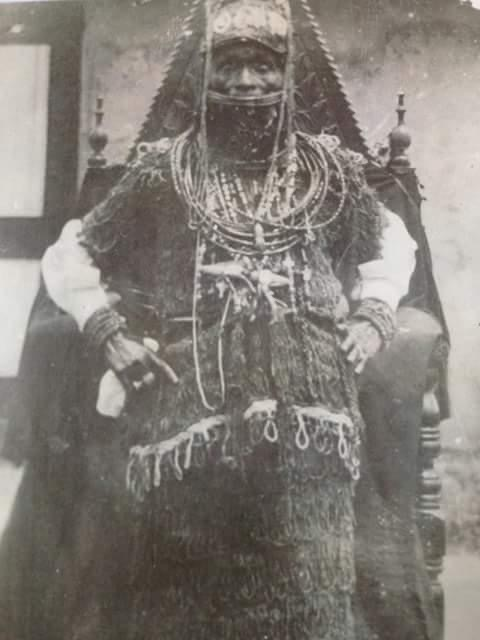
- Born: Nigeria
- Occupation: Traditional ruler
- Years active: 1936 - 1949
- Relatives: Olu Akengbuwa (grandfather)
- Website: warrikingdom.org

Olu Ginuwa II was a Nigerian traditional title holder and paramount leader of the Itsekiri who was Olu of Warri from 1936 to 1949. He was the 17th Olu of Warri Kingdom with the title Ogiame Ginuwa II. He was born Emiko Ikengbuwa. He succeeded his grandfather Olu Akengbuwa as Olu of Warri after an interregnum that lasted 88 years when Warri's political leadership was dominated by merchant princes. Atsibutsere Skinn, son of Princess Agbeje Ikengbuwa, presided over the selection and installation of Ogiame Ginuwa II in 1936 as head of the royal family.
