= Abejoye =

Nigerian traditional ruler

Olu Abejoye
- Occupation: Traditional Ruler
- Years active: 1674–1700
- Father: Olu Omoluyiri
- Website: warrikingdom.org

Olu Abejoye was the 10th Olu of Warri who ruled over the Itsekiri and non Itsekiri people in the kingdom. He was the son to Olu Omoluyiri, the 9th Olu of Warri Kingdom. He succeeded his father, Olu Omoluyiri as the 10th Olu of Warri. His Portuguese name was Luigi. He married a Portuguese noblewoman and was succeeded by his son Olu Akenjoye.
