= Agbudu shooting =

2020 mass shooting in Nigeria

- Location: Agbudu, Kogi State, Nigeria
- Date: 29 July 2020
- Attack type: Mass shooting
- Weapon: Gun
- Deaths: 14
- Injuries: 6
- Motive: Land rights

The Agbudu shooting was a mass shooting on 29 July 2020 in Agbudu village, Kogi State, Nigeria. The attack left 14 people dead and another 6 injured. Thirteen of the dead were members of the same family. Police said that a long-standing row over land rights is suspected to be the motive behind the attack.

== Shooting ==
On 29 July 2020, a gang of gunmen on motorcycles opened fire on a community in Kogi, Nigeria, killing 14 people, police said. According to state police chief Ede Ayuba, 13 of the victims were members of an Agbudu community family in the Korton-Karfe local government region of Kogi. Six others were injured in the attack and the shooters identities is unknown. The motive for the shooting remains uncertain however, the police have indicated that a long-standing land dispute may have been the motive for the shooting. Security forces were sent to the region and an investigation into the identity of the attackers was launched Ayuba said. The attack comes following a ban on motorcycles initiated by some states in response to their use in recent attacks.

== Response ==
Following the assault, state police chief Ede Ayuba told reporters that "the local government and all the personnel are helping us" and "the Ohimege of Koton-Karfe, Alhaji Abdulrazaq Isa-Koto, is also helping us."

== See also ==
- List of massacres in Nigeria
