= Olakunle Oluomo =

Nigerian politician (born 1963)

Olakunle Taiwo Oluwabukunmi Oluomo (born 11 October 1963) is a Nigerian politician currently serving as a member of the Ogun State House of Assembly. He served as the speaker of the 9th Ogun State House of Assembly from 2019 to 2023 and was re-elected speaker of the 10th assembly in June 2023 serving until January 2024 when he was impeached on allegations of financial embezzlement.

== Political career ==
He was first elected to the 7th Ogun State assembly in 2011 on the ticket of Action Congress of Nigeria (CAN) party to represent Ifo 1 State Constituency. He served as chairman, House Committee on Local Government and Chieftaincy Affairs and vice chairman House Committee on Justice, Ethics and Public Petitions. He was re-elected to the 8th assembly in 2015 on the ticket of All Progressives Congress (APC) following the merger of ACN and several other opposition parties that formed the APC. He was elected to the 9th assembly in 2019 and served as speaker of the assembly throughout the session (2015 -2023). Following his re-election in 2023, he was again elected speaker of the 10th assembly and served until January 2024 when he was removed from the position on the allegation of financial misappropriation.
