= Akenjoye =

Nigerian traditional ruler

Olu Akenjoye
- Occupation: Traditional Ruler
- Years active: 1701 - 1709
- Father: Olu Abejoye
- Website: warrikingdom.org

Olu Akenjoye was the 11th Olu of Warri who ruled over the Itsekiri and non Itsekiri people in the kingdom. He was the son to Olu Abejoye, the 10th Olu of Warri Kingdom. He succeeded his father as the 11th Olu of Warri. He took the title, Ogiame Sebastian II. He was succeeded by his son Olu Omagboye (Miguel).
