= April 2020 Katsina attacks =

Terrorist attacks in 2020 Katsina, Nigeria

- Location: Katsina State, Nigeria
- Date: 18 April 2020
- Attack type: Shooting
- Deaths: 47
- Perpetrator: Unknown

On 18 April 2020, gangs killed 47 people in villages in Katsina State, northern Nigeria. Hundreds of people have been killed during the last year in northwestern Nigeria by gangs and bandits who carry out robberies, kidnappings, murders, and cattle rustling. Similar attacks had happened in Katsina State in February 2020.

== Incident ==
The attackers, some armed with AK-47s, carried out the simultaneous mass murders in Danmusa, Dutsemna and Safana between 12:30am and 3am. About 300 armed men were involved in attacking the villages and demanding the food and other relief materials given as part of the government's efforts to help during the lockdown due to the coronavirus pandemic.

== Response ==
Members of the Police, Army, Air Force, Civil Defense and the Department of State Services were sent to the area. Minister of Public Affairs Mohammed Dingyadi released a statement through his Press Secretary Osaigbovo Ehisienmen to express his condolences to the government, the people of the state and the families impacted, he also said that the perpetrators would be found and dealt with. President Muhammadu Buhari condemned the attack and directed security agencies not to rest or lower their guard which he believed would create a vacuum to allow for the continued movement of the bandits.

The President of the Association of Industrial Security and Safety Operators of Nigeria, Dr. Ona Ekhomu stated that the blame for the attacks should be placed on the Commissioner of Police, Katsina State Police Command and the Military Commander in the state, due to security lapses.
