= Diocese of Orlu =

Roman Catholic diocese in Nigeria

Diocese of Orlu Dioecesis Orluana

Location
- Country: Nigeria
- Territory: Imo State
- Coordinates: 5°47′47″N 7°02′20″E

Statistics
- Area: 929 km^{2} (359 sq mi)
- Population: Total; Catholics: (as of 2022); 1,852,175; 1,268,950 (68.5%)
- Parishes: 195

Information
- Denomination: Roman Catholic
- Rite: Latin Rite
- Established: November 29, 1980
- Cathedral: Holy Trinity Cathedral in Orlu
- Secular priests: 305

Current leadership
- Pope: Leo XIV
- Bishop: Most Rev. A.T. Ukwuoma
- Auxiliary Bishops: Most. Rev. Thomas Ifeanyichukwu Obiatuegwu

Map
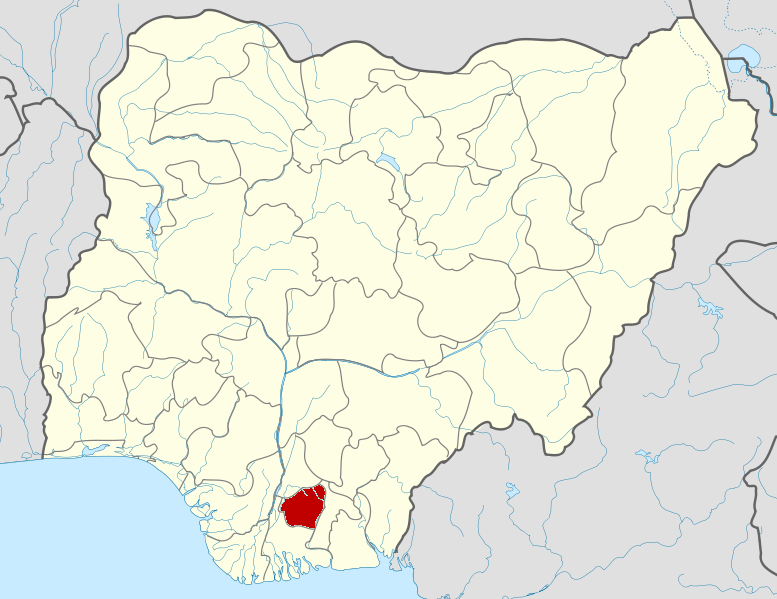
- Orlu is located in Imo State shown in red.

Website
- www.orludiocese.org

The Roman Catholic Diocese of Orlu (Latin: Orluan(a)) is a diocese located in the city of Orlu.

== History ==
- November 29, 1980: Established as Diocese of Orlu from the Diocese of Owerri

== Special churches ==
The Cathedral is Holy Trinity Cathedral in Orlu.

== Bishops ==
- Bishops of Orlu (Roman rite)
  - Bishop Gregory Ochiagha (1980-2008)
  - Bishop Augustine T. Ukwuoma (since June, 2008)

=== Other priest of this diocese who became bishop ===
- Brian Udaigwe, appointed nuncio and titular archbishop in 2013

== See also ==
- Roman Catholicism in Nigeria
