= Asiwaju Yinka Mafe =

Nigerian politician (1974–2020)

Asiwaju Yinka Mafe (4 February 1974 – 4 February 2020) was a Nigerian lawyer, and Majority Leader of the Ogun State House of Assembly.

== Education and personal life ==
Yinka Mafe had his primary education at Igudu Primary school, Warri, Delta state. He also attended Nana Primary school, also in Warri, Delta state. For his secondary school education, he attended Hussey College Warri, from where he moved to Dom-Domingos college, also in Warri, to complete his Secondary school education. In 1993, he gained admission to study law at the University of Benin.

== Professional career ==
Mafe was called to the Nigerian Bar as Solicitor of the Supreme Court of Nigeria after attending the Nigerian Law School Victoria Island, Lagos in 2001.

Mafe moved to the U.K in 2004 and obtained his master's degree in International business law from the Cambridge University in 2006. He took and passed the Qualified Lawyers Transfer Test at the London College of Law, where he got his qualifications to practice as a Solicitor of the Supreme Court of England in the UK. He worked as a solicitor in various law firms, and later owned MIB solicitors in the UK, after which he wound down the firm and moved back to Nigeria in 2010 to continue his political activities.

== Political career ==
Mafe was elected the Councillor of Ward Three in Sagamu Local Government Legislative Council in December 1998, a term which ended in 2002.

Mafe was elected as a member of the Ogun State House of Assembly in 2011 and became the Chairman, House Committee on Education, Science and Technology and re-elected in 2015. He represented Sagamu 1 constituency of Ogun State in the House of Assembly. He was the Majority Leader.

During the 2019 general elections, Mafe decamped from the All Progressives Congress (APC) and ran to represent the Remo Federal Constituency at the Federal House of Representatives under the platform of the Allied Peoples Movement (APM) and lost. He returned to the All Progressives Congress (APC) in April 2019.
