= Abule-Ado explosion =

Explosion and fire in Nigeria in 2020

The Abule-Ado explosion was an accidental explosion and fire that occurred in the Abule-Ado area around Festac Town, Amuwo Odofin Local Government Area, Lagos State, Nigeria. The explosion and fire started around 9 am on Sunday 15 March 2020; the fire was extinguished around 11 pm.

According to the Nigerian National Petroleum Corporation (NNPC), the explosion and fire was caused when a truck rammed into gas cylinders stacked in a gas processing plant near a vandalised petroleum gas pipeline. 276,000 people were displaced according to the Lagos State Government.

The Nigerian National Emergency Management Agency announced that as at 15 March, 2020 the number of casualties are 23 persons and 25 injured persons with 50 houses destroyed. This includes the students and the facilities at the Bethlehem Girls College, Abule-Ado which was destroyed. The school principal of Bethlehem Girls’ College at Abule Ado area of Lagos, Henrietta Alokha, was killed while trying to save her students from the inferno at the school.

The Lagos state government led by Babajide Sanwo-Olu created a relief fund for the victims of the explosion on 16 March 2020. The funds are marked as a 2 billion naira emergency fund with the Lagos State Government donating 250 million naira at its inception.
