= Gregory Ochiagha =

Nigerian bishop (1931–2020)

Gregory Obinna Ochiagha
- Archdiocese: Roman Catholic Archdiocese of Owerri
- Diocese: Roman Catholic Diocese of Orlu
- See: Holy See

Orders
- Ordination: 31 July 1960
- Consecration: 6 January 1981

Personal details
- Born: August 31, 1931 Nigeria
- Died: December 29, 2020 (aged 89) Nigeria
- Buried: 12th January 2021
- Denomination: Christianity

Gregory Obinna Ochiagha (31 August 1931 – 29 December 2020) was a Nigerian Roman Catholic bishop. He was the first Bishop of the Roman Catholic Diocese of Orlu, a position he held until he retired in 2008 and handed over to Bishop Augustine T. Ukwuoma his successor.

== Life and career ==
Ochiagha was born in Nigeria and was ordained to the priesthood on July 31, 1960. He served in various Catholic parishes and institutions for several years as a priest. He served as the first Rector of St. Joseph Major, Seminary, Ikot-Ekpene, Akwa Ibom State, Nigeria.

Ochiagha was ordained a bishop in Rome on January 6, 1981, and was thereafter appointed as the first bishop of the Roman Catholic Diocese of Orlu, Nigeria. He served in that capacity until 2008 when he retired and handed over to Bishop Augustine T Ukwuoma who is the current bishop of the diocese.

In 1990s Ochiagha reintroduced the Traditional Latin Mass in the Orlu diocese, becoming the first diocese in Nigeria to offer mass in Latin. In 2009 he invited the Priestly Fraternity of Saint Peter to establish a parish in his diocese.

== Death and burial ==
Ochiagha died on December 29, 2020, at a ripe age of 89. He was buried on January 12, 2021, at the Holy Trinity Cathedral, Orlu, Nigeria, a magnificent edifice he built while serving as the bishop of Orlu diocese.

== See also ==
- Roman Catholic Archdiocese of Owerri
- Roman Catholic Diocese of Orlu
- Bishops in the Catholic Church
- Catholic Church in Nigeria
- Catholic Bishops' Conference of Nigeria
