= Joseph Thlama Dawha =

Nigerian engineer (1954–2020)

Joseph Thlama

Managing Director of the Nigerian National Petroleum Corporation
- In office 1 August 2014 – 1 August 2015
- Preceded by: Dr. Andrew Yakubu
- Succeeded by: Emmanuel Ibe Kachikwu

Personal details
- Born: 29 March 1954 Biu, Nigeria
- Died: 4 August 2020 (aged 66) Cause of death= COVID-19
- Education: Ahmadu Bello University

Joseph Thlama Dawha (29 March 1954 – 4 August 2020) was a Nigerian administrative person appointed as the managing director of the Nigerian National Petroleum Corporation by president Goodluck Jonathan serving from August 2014 to 1 August 2015. He succeeded Dr. Andrew Yakubu. Prior to his appointment, he was group executive director of Exploration and Production in National Petroleum Corporation.

== Background ==
Dawha was born in Biu, Borno State. He held a bachelor and masters of science in chemical engineering at the Ahmadu Bello University and he also obtained his PhD in science engineering in 1988.

He began lecturing in 1978 at Borno State College of Science and Technology till 1984 where he became director of basic studies in Borno State College.

== NNPC ==
He joined the Petroleum Corporation in 1987 after leaving the academic field and in National Petroleum Corporation worked for some years. He later became executive director commercial service in Indorama in 2003. In 2005 he was also executive director in Niger Delta Power Holding Company Limited and managing director of Integrated Data Services Limited.
