= Abai Ikwechegh =

Nigerian jurist (1923–2020)

Justice Abai Ikwechegh OFR (7 September 1923 – 12 October 2020) was a Nigerian jurist.

== Life ==
Ikwechegh was born on 7 September 1923 to Ogbonnaya Ikwechegh, a warrant chief and a merchant, and Oyiri Ikwechegh of Igbere in Eastern Nigeria (now Abia State). He had his primary education in Igbere and further went to the Hope Waddell Training Institute in Calabar.

== Career ==
Ikwechegh began teaching at Abiriba, Ututu, Benin, Oka, and taught at Enitona College, Port Harcourt and Western Boys High School in Benin City. In October 1951, aged 28, Ikwechegh sailed from Apapa to Liverpool, England, to study law.

Ikwechegh was admitted into Kensington Universityin England. He sang in the choir at the Methodist Church in West Hampstead. In 1952, Ikwechegh lost his sponsorship and the Home Office in London decided to deport him. After his friend who had returned from Dublin rallied support in Nigeria funds were raised for Ikwechegh. Though he has settled for his stay abroad, Ikwechegh still faced difficulty that he had to start working in Lyon’s Tea Shop, and later as a conductor under the London Transport Service at Hendon, and as a clerk in the London Postal Services. He completed his studies, and was called to the English Bar in 1955, into the Lincoln’s Inn, Barrister at Law. On 23 August 1956 he moved back home and practiced law in Nigeria and Cameroon. He practiced briefly in Aba in Eastern Nigeria and in 1959 set up practice in Jos in Northern Nigeria. He was appointed a Magistrate in 1962. He was notable as a chief Magistrate for policing roads, arresting reckless taxi drivers and then trying them himself. This pitched him against authorities and left many wondering if this was not an abuse of judicial powers. In 1972. he was appointed a Judge of the East Central State of Nigeria, and later became Judge of Imo State judiciary and acted in several occasion as the Chief Judge of the State. In 1982, he was appointed a Justice of the Court of Appeal. He declined this appointment but later buckled under pressure. He thereafter served in the Court of Appeals and retired voluntarily as the Presiding Justice of the Court of Appeal at Enugu.

In 1960, Ikwechegh was appointed a magistrate and later served as a Judge of the East Central States until 1976 before he was transferred to the High Court of Imo State. In December 1977 he acted as the Chief Judge of that State and would do same in subsequent years. Ikwechegh was appointed as the Justice of the Federal Court of Appeal in 1982, though he declined the appointment and would work voluntarily until 1988.

== Appointments and final years ==
Ikwechegh was recognised in various ways in Nigeria. In January 1976, the East Central State Government appointed him as the head of the Administrative Tribunal to investigate to the issue which led to the Execution of Contracts for Data Processing Equipment. In 1978, he was appointed as one of the Chairmen in the Land Acquisition Control Tribunal which was as a fall out of the Land Use Act. Ikwechegh died on 12 October 2020 at the age of 97.
