= Atuwatse I =

Nigerian traditional ruler

Olu Atuwatse I (Olu Dom Domingos)
- Occupation: Traditional ruler
- Years active: 1625 – 1643
- Father: Olu Atorongboye
- Website: warrikingdom.org

Portuguese Traders with gifts bow before Olu Atuwatse I

Olu Atuwatse I (Olu Dom Domingos) was the 7th Olu of Warri who ruled over the Warri Kingdom. He was the son to Olu Atorongboye (Olu Sebastian) and succeeded his father Olu Atorongboye (Olu Sebastian) as the 7th Olu of Warri. He was initially home-schooled by his father and the Bishop in Ode-Itsekiri, which resulted in his ability to read and write in Portuguese. He was educated in Portugal from 1600 to 1611. He returned to Warri Kingdom as a graduate, making him the first graduate in Sub Saharan Africa Olu Dom Domingos was the second Christian Olu to rule Warri Kingdom. He married a Portuguese noblewoman, Maria Pereira, before returning to Nigeria with her in 1611.
