= Ikenwoli Godfrey Emiko =

Nigerian traditional ruler (1955–2020)

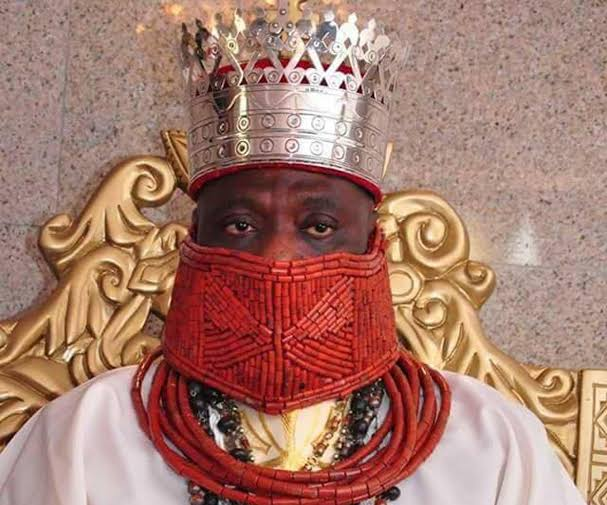
- Born: 19 March 1955
- Died: 21 December 2020 (aged 65)
- Occupation: Traditional Ruler
- Father: Erejuwa II

Ikenwoli Godfrey Emiko (19 March 1955 – 21 December 2020) was a Nigerian traditional ruler.

== Biography ==
Born to Olu Erejuwa II (1951–1986) and wife Olori Eyinagboluwade, Emiko was the 20th Olu of Warri. He succeeded his brother Olu Atuwatse II, who died in March 2015. He was crowned Ogiame Ikenwoli I on 12 December 2015 at Ode-Itsekiri, the ancestral home of the Itsekiri people, in a ceremony which was witnessed by many dignitaries in Nigeria, such as the Secretary to the Federal Government David Babachir Lawal, the Delta State Governor Senator Ifeanyi Okowa, Emmanuel Uduaghan (former Governor Delta State), and Bola Ahmed Tinubu the national leader of the All Progressive Congress (APC). He was the Olu of Warri and was married to Olori Mary Emiko. They had three children.

Emiko reportedly died on 21 December 2020, from COVID-19-related complications during the COVID-19 pandemic in Nigeria.
