= Akengbuwa =

Nigerian traditional ruler

Olu Akengbuwa
- Occupation: Traditional Ruler
- Years active: 1795 - 1848
- Father: Olu Erejuwa I
- Website: warrikingdom.org

Olu Akengbuwa was the 16th Olu of Warri who ruled over the Kingdom of Warri. He succeeded his father Olu Erejuwa I as the 16th Olu of Warri. He took the title, Ogiame Akengbuwa. He was also called Eyeolusan Joao. When he went to be with his fathers, there was a period of crisis following the death to the potential successors which was followed by a period of political Interregnum. His son Prince Oritsemone left Ode-Itsekiri during the period of the crisis to form Usele Community.
