= Ginuwa I =

Nigerian traditional ruler

Olu Ginuwa
- Occupation: Traditional Ruler
- Father: Oba Olua

Olu Ginuwa (also known as Iginuwa) was an Itsekiri king who was the first Olu of Warri. He was the eldest son of Oba Olua, the 14th Oba of Benin (1473–1480 A.D.) and Heir Apparent to the throne of the Great Benin Kingdom. He migrated from Benin Kingdom and was crowned the first Olu of Warri. He reigned for a period of 30 years. He reigned from 1480 to 1510. He was succeeded by his son, Olu Ijijen (Ogbowuru). Another of his sons, Olu Irame took over as king after Olu Ijijen joined his ancestors.
