= Ode-Itsekiri =

Community in Delta State, Nigeria

Ode-Itsekiri Itsekiri-Olu
- Communities of Warri Kingdom
- Capital Of Warri Kingdom
- Nickname: Big Warri
- Interactive map of Ode-Itsekiri
- Country: Nigeria
- State: Delta State
- LGA: Warri South
- Kingdom: Kingdom Of Warri

Government
  - Body: Warri South
  - Olu of Warri: Ogiame Atuwatse III
  - Council Chairman: Michael Tidi
  - Youth Chairman: Jonathan Ameye
- Website: www.warrikingdom.org

Ode-Itsekiri is a community in Warri South Local Government Area of Delta State, Nigeria. It is also called Itsekiri-Olu and Big Warri. It is the capital of the Itsekiri people and one of the first autonomous communities before the crowning of the Olu Ginuwa. It existed long before 1480, with exact data not known. The Olu's Palace in Ode-Itsekiri has always been used to crown the Olu of Warri Kingdom, while the Kings are buried at Ijala-Ikenren Community.

The Delta State government started a road project around 2006 to link Warri and Ode-Itsekiri. This project is expected to link Ode-Itsekiri and other Itsekiri communities close to it.

The popular song Megbele by Omawumi showed when she arrived at Ode-Itsekiri with boat and went to visit the Olu's Palace.

== Geography ==
Ode-Itsekiri Community is located in Ode-Itsekiri ward of Warri South and under Warri Federal Constituency of the Nigerian Federal constituency. Ode-Itsekiri Community shares boundaries with Orugbo Community, Ajigba Community, Inorin Community and Odogene Community.

== Social infrastructure ==
There are public and private infrastructures in Ode-Itsekiri Community.

=== Education ===
- Ginuwa Primary School, Ode-Itsekiri founded in 1936
- Erejuwa II Grammar School, Ode-Itsekiri

=== Health facilities ===
- Ode-Itsekiri Health Facility, Ode-Itsekiri

=== Roads and bridges ===
- Ode-Itsekiri Bridge, Ode-Itsekiri

== Cultural festival ==
Like other Itsekiri communities, Ode-Itsekiri Community is known widely for their very elaborate culture. One of the popular dances from Ode-Itsekiri community is the Ulu Oleretse which is danced by only the male indigenes of the community.

== Governance ==
Ode-Itsekiri Community has a governance structure that mirrors most other Itsekiri communities. The Olu of Warri is the overall head of the communities. This is followed by a council of elders, a community trust and a youth body.

== See also ==
- Warri
