= Ogun State House of Assembly =

- Ogun State Legislature

Type
- Type: unicameral
- Term limits: 4 years

History
- Founded: 3 February 1976

Leadership
- Speaker of the Assembly: Oludaisi Elemide, All Progressives Congress

Structure
- Seats: 26
- Political groups: Majority (25): All Progressives Congress (25); Minority (1): People's Democratic Party (1)
- Length of term: 4 years

Elections
- Voting system: Direct election
- Last election: May 2019

Website
- https://www.ogha.og.gov.ng

The Ogun State House of Assembly is the legislative branch of the Ogun State Government, Nigeria, inaugurated on 3 February 1979. The assembly is unicameral with 26 representatives elected from each constituencies of the 20 local government area of the state.

Presently, the Assembly consists of 25 members of the All Progressive Congress and 1 member of the People's Democratic Party.

== Presiding officer ==
The incumbent Speaker is Oludaisi Olusegun Elemide.
