= Yewa =

Subgroup of the Yoruba people

Yewa (Ẹgbado)
Total population
- ~ 907,370 (2011)

Regions with significant populations
- Ogun State - 907,370 · Imeko Afon: 97,830 · Yewa North: 216,820 · Yewa South: 198,530 · Ipokia: 177,370

Religion
- Christianity · Yoruba religion · Islam

The Ẹgbado (Morphology: Ẹgba l'odo), now Yewa, are a subgroup of the Yoruba people and mostly inhabit Ogun West Senatorial District, Ogun State, in south-west Nigeria, Africa. In 1995, the group's name was changed to Yewa after the Yewa River, the river they foraged towards. The name of this river is derived from the Yoruba deity Yewá. Yewa/Ẹgbado mainly occupy four Local Government Areas in Ogun State, Yewa South, Yewa North, Imeko-Afon, and Ipokia, while the Ado-Odo/Ota LGA forms the fifth Awori part of the senatorial district. Other Yewa/Ẹgbado are located in Lagos West, Lagos East, Oyo North, and Oyo South senatorial zones. Before the creation of the Southern Nigeria Protectorate, Egba territory and people is bordered by the Ketu (Benin) in the West, the Lagos Colony in south, Ijebu in the east, and Oyo, Ibadan and Isoya near Ile Ife in the north. The people are directly connected to the Ogun River, but detached from the swampy coast of Lagos. Through the Egba land, there are direct routes to other Yoruba towns, including Lagos, Ibadan, Ijebu-Ode, Ketu (Benin), and Porto Novo (Àjàṣẹ́) in the Benin Republic.

== History ==
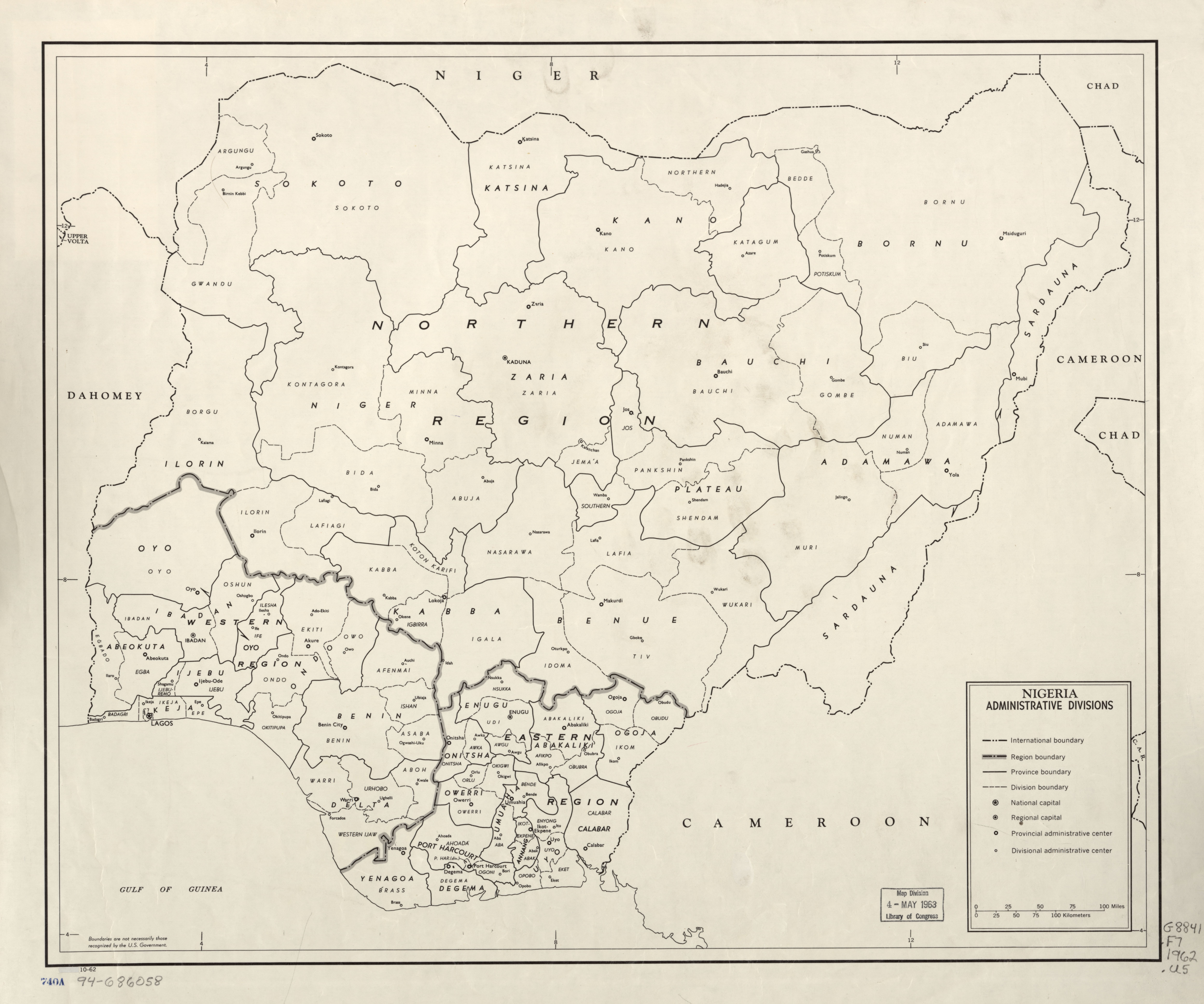
Nigeria, administrative divisions. LOC 94686058

The Ẹgbado appear to have migrated—possibly from the Ketu, Ile-Ife, or Oyo—to their current area early in the 14th to 18th century. Ẹgbado towns, most importantly Ipokia, Ado Odo, Ayetoro, Imeko Afon, Ilaro, and Igbogila, were established in the 11th to 18th century to take advantage of the slave trade routes from the inland Oyo empire to the coast at Porto-Novo. Other towns were Ilobi and Ijanna, which were strategic in protecting the flanks of the slaving routes. The Ẹgbados' were subject to the rule of the Oyo kingdom, which managed them via governor Onisare of Joanna. The Oyo were unable to deploy their cavalry force to protect the routes, due to tsetse fly and lack of horse fodder and thus had to rely on the Ẹgbado and Ẹgba people to manage the routes. The historians Akinjogbin, Morton-Williams, and Smith all agree that by the early 18th century this route to the coast was heavily engaged in slave trading and that slaves were the mainstay of the Oyo economy.

The Ẹgbado later achieved a fragile independence after the fall of the Oyo kingdom, but were subject to frequent attacks from other groups such as the slave-raiding Dahomey (who seized, among others, Princess Sarah Forbes Bonetta), and various tribes who wished to force open their own slave-trading routes to the sea. Ilaro and Ijanna towns had been destroyed in the 1830s. By the 1840s the Ẹgbado had come under the control of the adjacent Egba group, who used the Ẹgbado territory to forge routes to Badagry and the ports of Lagos. By the 1860s the Egba abandoned the route because the British were actively using their formidable navy to try to abolish the slave trade. Consequently, the Egba expelled British missionaries and traders from the area in 1867.

After 1890 the Ẹgbado asked for a British protectorate and got a small armed garrison, thus becoming independent of the Egba. This area became part of the British Colony and Protectorate of Nigeria in 1914, as Ẹgbado Division in Abeokuta Province. The administrative headquarters were later transferred away, after the creation of the new Ogun State, which subsumed the old Abeokuta Province.

== The Modern Ẹgbado/Yewa ==
In 1995 the Ẹgbado chose to rename themselves the "Yewa", after the name of the Yewa River that passes through the area they inhabit. They are primarily agriculturalists, but there is some artisan and textile processings. They are located mainly in the areas of: Ado-Odo/Ota, Ipokia, Yewa South, Yewa North, Imeko Afon, and part of Abeokuta North. There were complaints that the system of patronage and nepotism in Nigerian politics has caused the area to be neglected in terms of investment.

The area developed a popular style of music, called Bolojo, in the 1970s.

The Yewa Villages and Towns are also in Lagos State. The Olu of Ipaja, Lagos State is Yewa's.

The Population of people living in Yewa South, Yewa North, Ipokia, Imeko Afon, Ado Oddo /Otta Local Government Areas are above Three Millions people.

Ado-Odo / Otta Local Government Area is the most populated Local Government Area of Ogun State.

Source: Nigerian Census Population Commission.

Source of Reference: Yewa People Development Council.

== Notable individuals ==
The notable Yewa individuals include:

- Chief Joseph Folahan Odunjo, a Nigerian writer, educator and politician best known for his works in Yoruba children's literature.
- Tunji Otegbeye, a Nigerian politician, trade unionist and medical doctor.
- Kayode Egbetokun: Former Inspector General of Police, Nigeria.
- Professor Rahmon Ade Bello: a renowned chemical engineer and former Vice Chancellor, University of Lagos.
- Oba Dr Kehinde Gbadewole Olugbenle MFR, Asade Agunloye IV: The Olu Ilaro, Olu Yewa, Paramount Ruler of Yewaland, Ogun State.
- Honourable Jagunmola Akande Omoniyi FCA: Honourable Commissioner For Housing, Ogun State.
- Actress Seyi Edun: a Nigerian actress and film producer.
- Sarah Forbes Bonetta: Aina was a ward and goddaughter of Queen Victoria.
- Honourable Iziaq Adekunle Salako: a Nigerian politician and medical practitioner who serves as the Minister of State for Environment.
- Senator Felix Kolawole Bajomo: a Nigerian accountant and politician who was elected a member of the Senate for the Ogun West constituency of Ogun State in April 2007.
- Senator Iyabo Anisulowo: a Nigerian educator and elder stateswoman who served the Federal Government of Nigeria at many levels, she is one of the most prominent female political personalities and proponents of gender equality in Africa.
- Late Brigadier General Tunji Olurin: Former Military Administrator of Oyo State and Former Civilian Administrator of Ekiti State.
- Senator Solomon Olamilekan Adeola FCA, CON: Senator, Ogun West Senatorial District.
- Honourable Adekunle Akinlade: a Nigerian politician.
- Seriki Williams Abass: a renowned slave merchant in present-day southern Nigeria during the 19th century who became the "Paramount Ruler" of Badagry within the indirect rule structure established by the British.
- Suraj Adekunbi: a Nigerian politician and business man.
- Honourable Kayode Oladele: Nigerian-American civil rights lawyer, former member of the Nigerian House of Representatives and founding member of the National Democratic Coalition (NADECO).
- Dr. Ayinde Ibikunle: Surgeon and former member of the Constituent Assembly to review the Nigerian Constitution.
- Professor Anthony Asiwaju: international boundary scholar and Emeritus Professor of History at the University of Lagos.

== See also ==
- Egba United Government
