= Comprehensive High School, Aiyetoro =

Secondary school in Ogun State, Nigeria

- Sawonjao-Aiyetoro-Igbo Ora Road, Ayetoro 111109, Ogun State; Aiyetoro, Ogun state Nigeria

Information
- Other name: Compro
- Type: High School
- Established: 1963

Comprehensive High School is a secondary school in Ayetoro, a district in the Egbado Division of Ogun State, South Western Nigeria.

== History ==
Just after Nigeria attained independence in 1960, the authorities began to consider the problem of manpower needs and the desirability of having a secondary school system more closely related to such needs.

A nationwide review of the secondary school system was undertaken, arising from both direct initiative and external advice. Sixth form work in science subjects was given top priority together with the introduction of technical streams at the school-certificate level.

The then Western Region government, with external assistance from USAID (Harvard University) who provided staffing resources and Ford Foundation (who provided funding until 1973), established Comprehensive High School Ayetoro in February 1963. It was a US Senator from New Jersey who proposed the establishment of Comprehensive High Schools in Nigeria and Kenya as a gateway of US influence in Africa. It was the product of US international diplomacy through Educational AID and the PEACE Corpse of the JFK Administration. The physical project was given to USAID to execute and to administer for the first five years, while the academic staffing and curriculum activities were given to Harvard University with counterpart matching staff from the Western Nigeria educational ministry. Comprehensive High School Ayetoro quickly became a "Model School" in Nigeria and in the beginning years, many secondary schools would organize a short excursion visit to look at and to get a feel of the school on weekends. It was the first school in Nigeria to have one thousand or more students. It comprised Junior School starting at Form One and the Higher School of just 60 students, starting at the Lower Sixth Form and finishing with the Upper Sixth; and taking the Cambridge University Higher School Certificate Exam for University Admission. Hence Comprehensive High School Ayetoro started with a duality educational system, whereby the sixth form followed the existing British System and Curriculum, while the Junior School followed the American System and Curriculum, and very notably in the "Modern Mathematics" curriculum. However, after few years the plan of the American SAT exams as the terminal exam for the Junior school had to be changed to WAEC. Hence curriculum changes and additional tutoring classes had to be provided to the first students to get to form four and five.

The school was the second Comprehensive School in the country, after Government Comprehensive Secondary School, Port Harcourt, which was founded in 1962 through the collaboration of the then Eastern Nigeria Government and USAID, with its foundation instructors coming from the University of California, Los Angeles (UCLA).

Comprehensive High School, Ayetoro is situated on a 171-hectare land, 37 kilometers west of Abeokuta; it was founded as an experiment based on the philosophy proposed by the now belated founders, the Dr. Adam Skapski, Chief B. Somade, Judson T. Shaplin, and John Monro “Champion of the disadvantaged, as contained in an April 21, 1962 article published in the Harvard College, Cambridge, MA daily newspaper Harvard Crimson.

The philosophy is to achieve three goals: Serving the educational needs and potentialities of every child: Providing education which is relevant to the Technical, Economic, Social and Scientific needs of the society, as well as developing democratically minded citizens who would be aware of their country's social, economic and political problems in the present.

== School logo ==
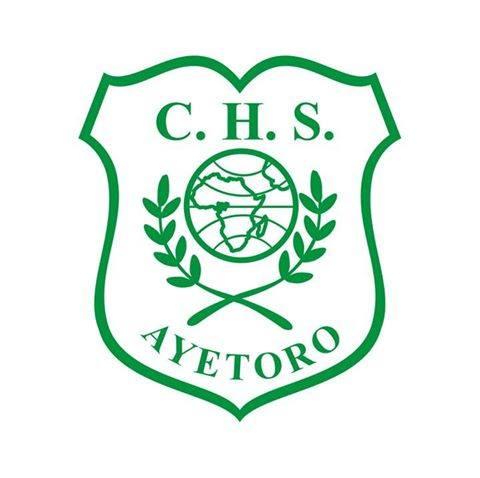
Comprehensive High School Logo

== Principals of CHSA since inception in 1963 ==
1. Dr. John Sly 1963–1964
2. Chief J. B. O. Ojo 1964–1968
3. Dr. D. J. Bullock 1968–1970
4. Mr. L. A. Sofenwa 1970–1974
5. Dr. M. O. Alafe-Aluko 1974–1976
6. Mr. G. O. Kehinde 1976–1978
7. Mr. S. A. Ibikunle 1978–1982
8. Deacon G. O. Adekunte 1982–1986
9. Mr. J. O. Idowu 1986–1990
10. Chief P. A. Olaleye 1991–1995
11. Mr. T. O. Olanrewaju 1995–2001
12. Elder J. A. Idowu 2001–2007
13. Mr. Morenikeji 2007–2008
14. Mr. F. Sawyerr 2008–2012
15. Mr. O. Akinyinka 2012–2015
16. Mr. Sekunmade S. S. 2015–2021
17. Mr. Oladipe 2021–present

== Benefactors ==
- Late Chief H.M.B Somade, Former Chief Inspector of Education, Western State of Nigeria
- Late Adam Stanislaw Skapski, Former USAID Staff & Ford Foundation Education Advisor). According to Chief Somade, without Dr. Skapski there would never have been any Aiyetoro Comprehensive High School. His prodigious energy, knowledge and devotion to the course of education progress in Nigeria endeared him in the hearts of many in the education field throughout the country. The Late Dr. Adam Skapski was buried on the campus of CHSA.
- Late Lt.-Colonel Adekunle Fajuyi, the first Military Governor of Western State; As a tribute to his work in Aiyetoro the Assembly Hall at the school was named after him. He was killed in the 1966 counter-coup just few days after visiting CHSA and gave a speech at the hall.
- Dean Shaplin, Former Associate Dean, Harvard University Graduate school of Education. He was involved in the desegregation of public schools with the then US Secretary of Education Francis Keppel during the JFK regime.
- Late Professor Fletcher-Watson, Harvard Professor, He developed Science curriculum at CHSA.
- Professor Munroe, Harvard University (He was described as a Champion of the Disadvantaged)
- Late Chief Moshood Kashimawo Olawale Abiola, The selfless Compro Parent who was present and active at almost all events on campus in the late 70's; MKO as he was fondly called did a lot for the school, notably the building of the school Clinic and the donation of a school Bus.
- President Olusegun Obasanjo, During his farewell tour of Ogun State as the outgoing Military Head of State of Nigeria in 1979, General Obasanjo toured the campus of CHSA and was so impressed that he described the school as the best of its kind in Africa. He then donated the sum of one million Naira towards the school on behalf of the Federal Government of Nigeria. In 1979 the exchange rate of the Naira to the US dollar was at 60 Kobo to 1 US dollar.

== Notable alumni ==
- Professor Benjamin Akande, Class of 1978, Noted Economist, former president of two American Universities - Westminster College and Champlain College, and Vice Chancellor Washington University in St. Louis, currently Vice President, Stifel Financial investment bank USA
- Oba (Prof.) Akinola Owosekun, Asotun of Isotun.
- Dr. Kunle Y. Adamson, former prof (Stevens, Rider, DeVry, Rutgers - NJ);
- Exec Dir ADAMSON ECONOMICS ORG & Africa Dev Mgmt Network (www.adamson-economics.org)
- Professor Oluwole Ajagbe, Dental Surgeon, Oral and Maxillofacial Pathologist, Forensic Examiner and Odontology, Dental Sleep Medicine Specialist, Dental Implantologist and Cosmetic Dentist.
- US African Diaspora representative at Abidjan AfDB Conference on Remittance Fund Investment Strategy
- First Secretary and Founder of CHSA Old Students Association 1967-1968.
- School Prefect and Football Captain 1966, and Western Region Academical Football team member.
- Dr. Olusegun Salako, Former President ANPA - Association of Nigerian Physicians in the Americas.
- Oluwarotimi Odunayo Akeredolu (SAN), Governor Ondo State and Former President Nigerian Bar Association.
- Mike Adenuga, Chief executive officer Globacom communications.
- Prof Adenike Osofisan, First Nigerian female Professor of Computer Science.
- Prof. Abimbola Olowofoyeku, Brunel University Law School.
- Prof Deji Adekunle, Director General of the Nigerian Institute of Advanced Legal Studies.
- Mr. Kola Abiola, Son of late chief M K O Abiola.
- Dr. Prince Femi Debo-Omidokun, IT/Cybersecurity Consultant, Canada
- Suraj Adekunbi, businessman and politician
- Olusegun Adewoye, scientist
- Olufemi Oginni, Licensed Practical Nurse
- Tope Mark-Odigie TV personality and entrepreneur
