= List of naturalized American citizens =

Citizenship of the United States of America can be acquired in different ways, one of those being naturalization.

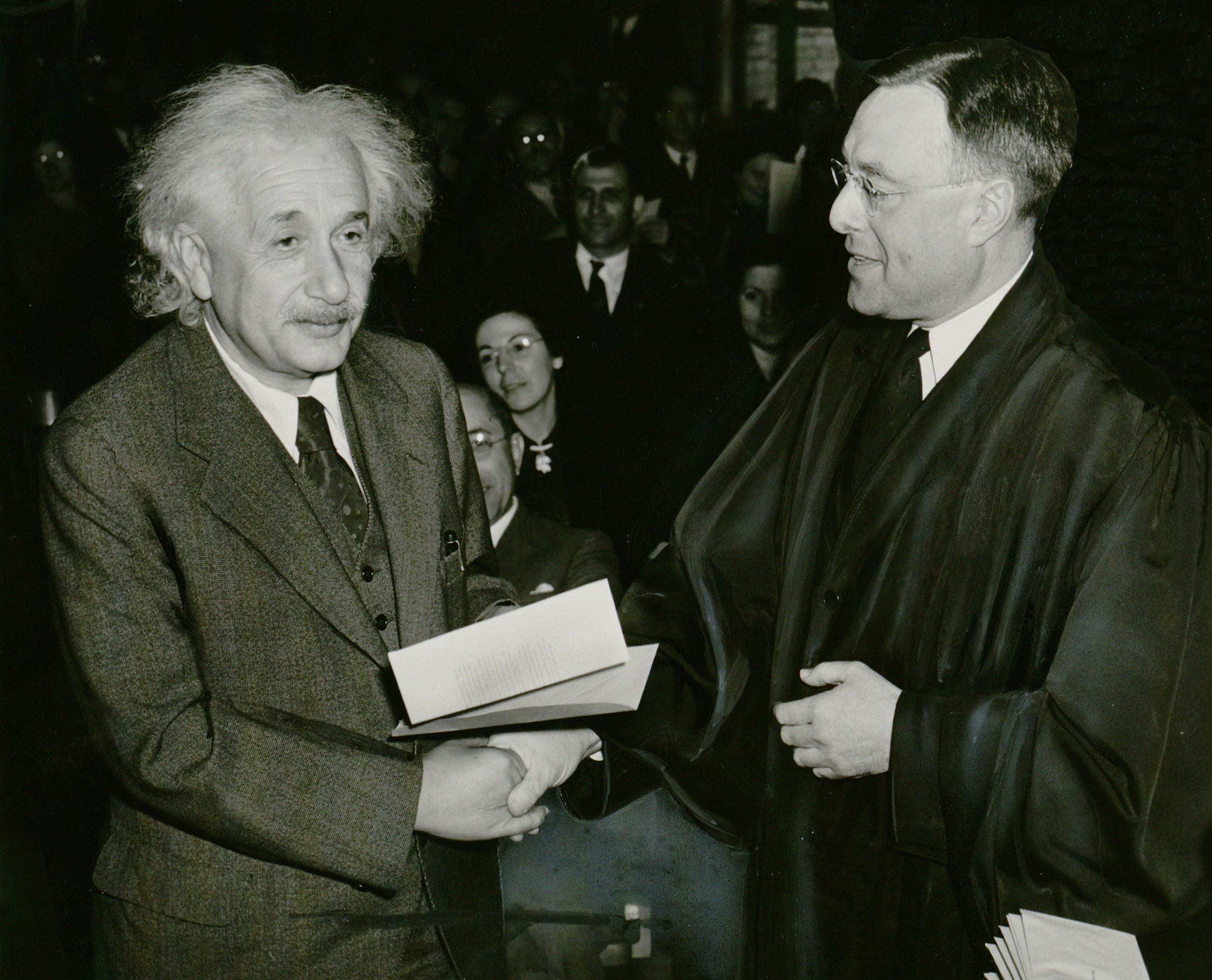
Albert Einstein receiving American citizenship in 1940.

== Art and literature ==
=== Architects ===
- Esra Akcan – Born and raised in Turkey.
- César Pelli – Born and raised in Argentina. Became a U.S. citizen in 1964.
- I. M. Pei – Born and raised in China.
- Friedrich St. Florian – Born and raised in Austria.

=== Journalists ===
- Masih Alinejad – Born and raised in Iran. Became a U.S. citizen in 2019.
- Cecilia Alvear – Born in Ecuador. Became a U.S. citizen in 1984.
- Piotr Domaradzki – Born and raised in Poland. Became a U.S. citizen in 1996.
- Veronique Peck – Born in France. Became a U.S. citizen in 1976.
- Cornelius Ryan – Born and raised in Ireland. Became a U.S. citizen in 1951.
- Hari Sreenivasan – Born in India. Became a U.S. citizen in 2008.

=== Painters ===
- José Bernal – Born in Cuba. Became a U.S. citizen in 1980.
- Janice Biala – Born in Poland. Became a U.S. citizen in 1929.
- Dorothy Brett – Born in the United Kingdom. Became a U.S. citizen in 1938
- Rudolf Cronau – Born in Germany. Became a U.S. citizen in 1901.
- Marcel Duchamp – Born and raised in France. Became a U.S. citizen in 1955.
- Pál Fried – Born and raised in Hungary, immigrated to the U.S. in 1946 becoming a citizen in 1953.
- Charles Hoffbauer – Born and raised in France. Became a U.S. citizen in 1941.
- Tania Marmolejo – Born and raised in the Dominican Republic.
- Mark Rothko – Born and raised in Russia. Became a U.S. citizen in 1938.

=== Sculptors ===
- Louise Bourgeois – Born and raised in France. Became a U.S. citizen in 1951.
- Luigi Del Bianco – Born and raised in Italy.
- Enrico Cerracchio – Born in Italy, immigrated to the U.S. in 1900 becoming a citizen in 1905.
- Anthony de Francisci – Born and raised in Italy. Became a U.S. citizen in 1913.
- Arturo Di Modica – Born and raised in Italy.

=== Writers ===
- Isabel Allende – Born in Chile. Became a U.S. citizen in 1993.
- Svetlana Alliluyeva – Born and raised in the Soviet Union (modern-day Russia). Became a U.S. citizen in 1978.
- Flavio Alves – Born and raised in Brazil. Became a U.S. citizen in 2010.
- Isaac Asimov – Born in Russia, moved to the U.S. at the age of 3 becoming a citizen at the age of 8 in 1928.
- Anna Astvatsaturian Turcotte – Born in Azerbaijan and raised between there, Armenia and the United States. Became a U.S. citizen in 1997.
- W. H. Auden – Born and raised in the United Kingdom. Became a U.S. citizen in 1946.
- Isaac Bashevis Singer – Born and raised in Poland.
- Vicki Baum – Born and raised in Austria. Became a U.S. citizen in 1938.
- Saul Bellow – Born and raised in Canada. Became a U.S. citizen in 1941.
- Helena Blavatsky – Born and raised in Russia (modern-day Ukraine). Became a U.S. citizen in 1878
- Joseph Brodsky – Born and raised in the Soviet Union (modern-day Russia). Became a U.S. citizen in 1977.
- Carlos Castaneda – Born in Peru. Became a U.S. citizen in 1957.
- James Clavell – Born and raised in Australia. Became a U.S. citizen in 1963.
- Jackie Collins – Born in the United Kingdom. Became a U.S. citizen in 1960.
- Bernard Cornwell – Born and raised in the United Kingdom.
- Thomas B. Costain – Born in Canada. Became a U.S. citizen in 1920.
- Ève Curie – Born and raised in France before becoming a U.S. citizen in 1958
- Junot Díaz – Born in the Dominican Republic. Immigrated to the U.S. in 1974.
- Anu Garg – Born in India. Became a U.S. citizen in 2008.
- Olga Grushin – Born and raised in Russia. Became a U.S. citizen in 2002.
- Immaculée Ilibagiza – Born and raised in Rwanda. Became a U.S. citizen in 2013.
- Gerda Weissmann Klein – Born and raised in Poland. Became a U.S. citizen in 1948.
- Klaus Mann – Born in Germany. Became a U.S. citizen in 1943.
- Claude McKay – Born in Jamaica. Became a U.S. citizen in 1940.
- Walter Mehring – Born and raised in Germany.
- David Morrell – Born and raised in Canada. Became a U.S. citizen in 1993.
- Vladimir Nabokov – Born and raised in Russia. Became a U.S. citizen in 1945.
- Otto Plath – Born and raised in Germany. Immigrated to the U.S. in 1900.
- Ayn Rand – Born and raised in Russia. Became a U.S. citizen in 1931.
- David Rakoff – Born in Canada. Became a U.S. citizen in 2003.
- Erich Maria Remarque – Born and raised in Germany. Immigrated to the U.S. in 1939 and became a citizen in 1947.
- Elie Wiesel – Born in Romania. Became a U.S. citizen in 1963.
- Frances Wright – Born in Scotland. Became a U.S. citizen in 1825.

== Business ==
=== Education ===
- Benjamin Akande – Born and raised in Nigeria.
- Dieter Cunz – Born and raised in the German Empire (modern-day Germany). Became a U.S. citizen in 1944.
- Lorraine Eden – Born and raised in Canada.
- Jaime Escalante – Born and raised in Bolivia.

=== Entrepreneurs ===
- Steve Chen – Born in Taïwan and immigrated to the U.S. in 1985.
- Jawed Karim – Born and raised in Germany.
- Iqbal Quadir – Born and raised in Bangladesh. Became a U.S. citizen later in life.

=== Fashion ===
==== Fashion designers ====
- Oleg Cassini – Born in Russia and immigrated to the U.S. in 1936.
- Tan France – Born and raised in the United Kingdom. Became a U.S. citizen in 2020.
- Diane von Fürstenberg – Born and raised in Belgium. Became an U.S. citizen in 2002.
- Carolina Herrera – Born in Venezuela. Became a U.S. citizen in 2009.
- Oscar de la Renta – Born and raised in the Dominican Republic.
- Ferdinando Sarmi – Born in Italy. Became a U.S. citizen in 1959.

==== Models ====
- Heidi Albertsen – Born and raised in Denmark. Became a U.S. citizen in 2016.
- Camila Alves – Born in Brazil. Became a U.S. citizen in 2015.
- Alessandra Ambrosio – Born and raised in Brazil. Became a U.S. citizen in 2020.
- Moran Atias – Born and raised in Israel. Became a U.S. citizen in 2017.
- Xenia Deli – Born and raised in Moldova.
- Iman – Born in Somalia and raised in Saudi Arabia and Egypt. Moved to the U.S. in 1976.
- Heidi Klum – Born and raised in Germany. Became a U.S. citizen in 2008.
- Karolína Kurková – Born and raised in Czechoslovakia (modern-day Czech Republic). Later became a naturalized U.S. citizen.
- China Machado – Born in China, raised in China, South America and Spain before coming to the U.S.
- Genevieve Morton – Born and raised in South Africa. Became a U.S. citizen in 2026.
- Marite Ozers – Born in Latvia and moved to the U.S. in 1945.
- Paulina Porizkova – Born and raised in Czechoslovakia (modern-day Czech Republic) and Sweden. Moved to the U.S. in 1984.
- Claudia Romani – Born and raised in Italy. Became a U.S. citizen in 2019.
- Anne Vyalitsyna – Born and raised in Russia. Became a U.S. citizen in 2013.

=== Inventors ===
- Itzhak Bentov – Born and raised in Czechoslovakia (modern-day Slovakia). Became a U.S. citizen in 1962.
- George Garrett – Born and raised in the United Kingdom. Became a U.S. citizen in 1902.
- Alexander Graham Bell – Born in Scotland. Became a U.S. citizen in 1882.
- Leo Gerstenzang – Born in Poland. Became a U.S. citizen in 1919.
- James Hillier – Born in Canada. Became a U.S. citizen in 1945.
- Francis F. Lee – Born and raised in China. Became a U.S. citizen in 1954.
- Fritz Karl Preikschat – Born and raised in Germany. Became a U.S. citizen in 1962.
- Nikola Tesla – Born in the Austrian Empire (modern-day Croatia) to a family from Serbia. Became a U.S. citizen in 1891.
- Arthur Wynne – Born and raised in the United Kingdom. Became a U.S. citizen in 1920.

=== Media tycoons ===
- Rupert Murdoch – Born and raised in Australia. Became a U.S. citizen in 1985.

=== Real estate ===
- Mark Taper – Born in Poland and raised in the United Kingdom. Became a U.S. citizen in 1930.
- Frederick Trump – Born in Kingdom of Bavaria (modern-day Germany). Became a U.S. citizen in 1892.

== Crime figures ==
- Ralph Capone – Born in Italy. Arrived in the U.S. in 1895.
- Frank Costello – Born in Italy. Became a U.S. citizen in 1925.
- Tommy Lucchese – Born in Italy. Arrived in the U.S. in 1911.
- Patrick Nee – Born in Ireland. Arrived in the U.S. in 1953.
- William Obront – Born and raised in Canada.
- Santo Sorge – Born and raised in Italy. Arrived in the U.S. in 1948.
- William Tocco – Born in Italy. Became a U.S. citizen in 1918.

== Entertainment ==
=== Actors ===
==== Male actors ====
- Michael Allinson – Born and raised in the United Kingdom. Became a U.S. citizen in 1964 after immigrating there in 1958.
- Robbie Amell – Born and raised in Canada. Became a U.S. citizen in 2020.
- Naveen Andrews – Born and raised in the United Kingdom. Became a U.S. citizen in 2010.
- Desi Arnaz – Born in Cuba. Arrived in the U.S. in 1933.
- Dan Aykroyd – Born and raised in Canada.
- Conrad Bain – Born and raised in Canada. Became a U.S. citizen in 1946.
- Christian Bale – Born and raised in the United Kingdom.
- Jamie Bamber – Born and raised in the United Kingdom.
- John Barrowman – Born and raised in the United Kingdom. Become a U.S. citizen in 1985.
- Steven Bauer – Born in Cuba. Arrived in the U.S. in 1959.
- Brian Bedford – Born and raised in the United Kingdom.
- Demián Bichir – Born and raised in Mexico.
- Diego Boneta – Born in Mexico and raised between Mexico and U.S. Became a U.S. citizen in 2010. (Also a Spanish citizen).
- Stephen Boyd – Born and raised in the United Kingdom, specifically Northern Ireland. Became a U.S. citizen in 1963.
- Charles Boyer – Born and raised in France. Became a U.S. citizen in 1942.
- Pierce Brosnan – Born and raised in Ireland. Became a U.S. citizen in 2004.
- Yul Brynner – Born in Far Eastern Republic (modern-day Russia). Became a U.S. citizen in 1943.
- Jim Carrey – Born and raised in Canada. Became a U.S. citizen in 2004.
- Maxwell Caulfield – Born and raised in the United Kingdom. Became a U.S. citizen in 1991.
- Tommy Chong – Born and raised in Canada. Became a U.S. citizen in the 1980s.
- Andy Clyde – Born and raised in the United Kingdom. Became a U.S. citizen in 1943.
- Alec Craig – Born and raised in the United Kingdom. Became a U.S. citizen in 1939.
- Daniel Craig – Born and raised in the United Kingdom. Became a U.S. citizen in 2019.
- Hume Cronyn – Born and raised in Canada.
- Alan Cumming – Born and raised in the United Kingdom, specifically Scotland. Became a U.S. citizen in 2008.
- Helmut Dantine – Born and Raised in Austria. Became a U.S. citizen in 1944.
- Alexander D'Arcy – Born in Egypt. Became a U.S. citizen in 1942.
- Wheeler Dryden – Born and raised in the United Kingdom. Became a U.S. citizen in 1936.
- Alejandro Edda – Born and raised in Mexico.
- Nathan Fillion – Born and raised in Canada. Became a U.S. citizen in 1997.
- James Finlayson – Born and raised in the United Kingdom. Became a U.S. citizen in 1942.
- Errol Flynn – Born and raised in Australia. Became a U.S. citizen in 1942.
- Glenn Ford – Born and raised in Canada. Became a U.S. citizen in 1939.
- Michael J. Fox – Born and raised in Canada. Became a U.S. citizen in 2000.
- Andy García – Born in Cuba. Arrived in the U.S. in 1961.
- George Gaynes – Born in the Russian Empire (modern-day Finland). Became a U.S. citizen in 1948.
- Giacomo Gianniotti – Born in Italy, Raised in Canada. Became a U.S. citizen in 2025.
- Daniel Goddard – Born and raised in Australia. Became a U.S. citizen in 2020.
- Lev Gorn – Born and raised in the Soviet Union (modern-day Russia).
- Cary Grant – Born and raised in the United Kingdom. Became a U.S. citizen in 1942.
- Jason Gray-Stanford – Born and raised in Canada. Became a U.S. citizen in 2019.
- Mickey Hargitay – Born and raised in Hungary. Arrived in the U.S. in 1947.
- Anthony Hopkins – Born and raised in the United Kingdom. Became a U.S. citizen in 2000.
- Aharon Ipalé – Born in Morocco and raised in Israel.
- Makoto Iwamatsu – Born and raised in Japan. Became a U.S. citizen in 1956.
- Jason Jones – Born and raised in Canada. Became a U.S. citizen in 2014.
- Werner Klemperer – Born and raised in Germany. Moved to U.S. in 1933.
- Kurt Kreuger – Born and raised in Germany. Became a U.S. citizen in 1944.
- Charles Laughton – Born and raised in the United Kingdom, becoming a U.S. citizen in 1950.
- Peter Lawford – Born and raised in the United Kingdom. Became a U.S. citizen in 1960.
- John Leguizamo – Born in Colombia. Arrived in the U.S. at age four.
- Gene Lockhart – Born in Canada. Became a U.S. citizen in 1939
- Alexander Lockwood – Born in Austria-Hungary (modern-day Czech Republic).
- John Loder – Born and raised in the United Kingdom. Became a U.S. citizen in 1947.
- Daniel Logan – Born and raised in New Zealand. Became a U.S. citizen in 2007.
- Peter Lorre – Born and raised in Hungary (modern-day Slovakia). Became a U.S. citizen in 1941.
- Bela Lugosi – Born and raised in Hungary. Became a U.S. citizen in 1931.
- Keye Luke – Born in China. Became a U.S. citizen in 1943.
- Dolph Lundgren – Born and raised in Sweden. Became a U.S. citizen in 2024.
- Patrick Macnee
- James Mason
- Peter Mayhew – Born and raised in the United Kingdom. Became a U.S. citizen in 2005.
- David McCallum – Born and raised in the United Kingdom. Became a U.S. citizen in 1999.
- Eric McCormack – Born and raised in Canada. Became a U.S. citizen in 1999.
- Roddy McDowall – Born and raised in the United Kingdom. Became a U.S. citizen in 1949.
- Kevin McKidd – Born and raised in the United Kingdom, specifically Scotland. Got U.S. citizenship in 2015.
- Julian McMahon
- Peter McRobbie
- Wentworth Miller – Born in the United Kingdom but raised in the U.S. Became a U.S. citizen in childhood.
- Alfred Molina – Born and raised in the United Kingdom. Became a U.S. citizen in 2004.
- Liam Neeson – Born and raised in the United Kingdom, specifically Northern Ireland. Became a U.S. citizen in 2009.
- Leslie Nielsen
- Soon-Tek Oh
- Jason O'Mara – Born and raised in Ireland. Became a U.S. citizenship in 2009.
- Dan O'Herlihy – Born and raised in Ireland. Became a U.S. citizen in 1983.
- David Oyelowo – Born and raised in the United Kingdom. Became a U.S. citizen in 2016.
- Hal Ozsan
- Nathan Parsons
- Barry Pepper
- Walter Pidgeon – Born and raised in Canada. Became a U.S. citizen in 1943.
- Jürgen Prochnow – Born and raised in Germany. Became a U.S. citizen in 2004.
- Ke Huy Quan
- Anthony Quinn – Born in Mexico to Irish immigrants. Became a U.S. citizen in 1947.
- Claude Rains – Born and raised in the United Kingdom. Became a U.S. citizen in 1939.
- Roger Rees – Born and raised in the United Kingdom, specifically Wales. Became a U.S. citizen in 1989.
- Duncan Renaldo
- Michael Rennie
- Alejandro Rey
- Ryan Reynolds – Born and raised in Canada. Became a U.S. citizen in 2018.
- Paul Rodriguez
- Tristan Rogers
- José Ruben – Born and raised in France. Became a U.S. citizen in 1920.
- Sabu – Born and raised in British India. Became a U.S. citizen in 1944.
- Horatio Sanz – Born in Chile. Became a U.S. citizen in 2018.
- Arnold Schwarzenegger – Born and raised in Austria. Became a U.S. citizen in 1983.
- Ignacio Serricchio
- Martin Short – Born in Hamilton, Ontario, Canada. Became a U.S. citizen sometime in the 1980s or early 1990s
- Harry Shum Jr. – Born in Costa Rica, but raised in the U.S.
- Sebastian Stan – Born in Romania. Became a U.S. citizen in 2002.
- James Stephenson – Born and raised in the United Kingdom. Became a U.S. citizen in 1938.
- Lee Strasberg
- Gregg Sulkin – Born in the United Kingdom. Became a U.S. citizen in 2018.
- Francis L. Sullivan
- Rod Taylor – Born and raised in Australia. Became a U.S. citizen in 1956.
- Carlos Valdes
- Steve Valentine
- Goran Višnjić – Born and raised in Yugoslavia (modern-day Croatia). Became a U.S. citizen in 2013.
- Arnold Vosloo – Born and raised in South Africa. Became a U.S. citizen in 1988.
- Anton Yelchin – Born in the Soviet Union (modern-day Russia), but raised in the U.S. Became a U.S. citizen in childhood.

==== Actresses ====
- Christine Adams – Born and raised in England. Became a U.S. citizen in 2019.
- Neile Adams – Born and raised in the Philippines.
- Shohreh Aghdashloo – Born and raised in Iran.
- Anna Maria Alberghetti – Born in Italy. Became a U.S. citizen in 1961.
- Malin Akerman – Born in Sweden, but raised in Canada. Became a U.S. citizen in 2018.
- Ana Alicia – Born and raised in Mexico.
- Pamela Anderson – Born and raised in Canada. Became a U.S. citizen in 2004.
- Fernanda Andrade – Born and raised in Brazil.
- Evelyn Ankers – Grew up between South America and Europe. Became a U.S. citizen in 1946.
- Ann-Margret – Born in Sweden. Became a U.S. citizen in 1949.
- Gabrielle Anwar – Became a U.S. citizen in 2008.
- Jayne Atkinson – Born in the United Kingdom and moved to the U.S. when she was a child.
- Morena Baccarin – Born and raised in Brazil.
- Olga Baclanova – Born and raised in Russia. Became a U.S. citizen in 1931.
- Yetide Badaki – Born in Nigeria. Became a U.S. citizen in 2014.
- Jacinda Barrett – Born in Australia. Became a U.S. citizen in 2009.
- Wendy Barrie – Became a U.S. citizen in 1942.
- Mischa Barton – Born in the United Kingdom. Became a U.S. citizen in 2006.
- Frances Bay – Born and raised in Canada.
- Stephanie Beatriz – Born in Argentina. Moved to the U.S. at the age of 2. Became a U.S. citizen at the age of 18.
- Catherine Bell – Born and raised in the United Kingdom
- Alma Beltran – Born and raised in Mexico.
- Ingrid Bergman – Born in Sweden. Became a U.S. citizen in 1945.
- Emily Blunt – Born and raised in the United Kingdom. Became a U.S. citizen in 2015.
- Sônia Braga – Born in Brazil. Became a U.S. citizen in 2003.
- Antoinette Bower – Born and raised in Germany. She moved to Canada in 1953 and after to the U.S. in 1961.
- Lesley-Ann Brandt – Born and raised in South Africa. Became a U.S. citizen in 2023.
- Natalie Burn – Born and raised in Ukraine. Became a U.S. citizen in 2018.
- Saffron Burrows – Born and raised in the United Kingdom. Became a U.S. citizen in 2009.
- Annette Carell – Born in Germany. Became a U.S. citizen in 1944.
- Madeleine Carroll – Born and raised in the United Kingdom. Became a U.S. citizen in 1943.
- Kim Cattrall – Born in the United Kingdom and raised in Canada. Became a U.S. citizen in 2020.
- Loan Chabanol – Born in France. Became a U.S. citizen in 2020.
- Charo – Born in Spain. Became a U.S. citizen in 1977.
- Joan Chen – Born in China. Became a U.S. citizen in 1989.
- Emmanuelle Chriqui – Born in Canada. Became a U.S. citizen in 2017.
- Mady Christians – Born in Austria-Hungary (modern-day Austria) and raised in Germany. Moved to the U.S. in 1912.
- Claudette Colbert – Born in France. Became a U.S. citizen in 1912.
- Lili Darvas – Born and raised in Hungary. Became a U.S. citizen in 1944.
- Ludmila Dayer – Born and raised in Brazil. Became a U.S. citizen in 2016.
- Ana De Armas – Born in Spain and raised in Cuba. Became a U.S. citizen in 2023.
- India de Beaufort – Born and raised in the United Kingdom. Became a U.S. citizen in 2020.
- Olivia de Havilland – Born in Japan and raised in the United Kingdom. Became a U.S. citizen in 1941. She is also a French citizen since 1955.
- Emilie de Ravin – Born and raised in Australia. Became a U.S.citizen in 2018.
- Portia de Rossi – Born and raised in Australia. Became a U.S. citizen in 2011.
- Yvonne De Carlo – Born and raised in Canada.
- Kate del Castillo – Born and raised in Mexico. Became a U.S. citizen in 2015.
- Marlene Dietrich – Born and raised in Germany. Became a U.S. citizen in 1939 while renouncing her German citizenship.
- Diana Douglas – Born and raised in Bermuda. Was a U.S. citizen and a British citizen.
- Marie Dressler – Born in Canada. Moved to the U.S. as a child.
- Minnie Driver – Born in the United Kingdom, raised in Barbados. Became a U.S. citizen in 2017.
- Deanna Durbin – Born in Canada. Became a U.S. citizen in 1923.
- Samantha Eggar – Born and raised in the United Kingdom. Moved to the U.S. in 1973.
- Alice Eve – Born and raised in the United Kingdom, specifically England. Became a U.S. citizen in 2017.
- Geraldine Fitzgerald – Born and raised in Ireland. Became a U.S. citizen in 1955.
- Nina Foch – Born in Netherlands, but raised in the U.S.
- Megan Follows – Born and raised in Canada.
- Joan Fontaine – Born in Japan to English parents. Raised in the United Kingdom. Became a U.S. citizen in 1943.
- Eva Gabor – Born and raised in Hungary. Arrived in the U.S. in 1937.
- Magda Gabor – Born and raised in Hungary. Arrived in the U.S. in 1946.
- Zsa Zsa Gabor – Born and raised in Hyngary. Arrived in the U.S. in 1941.
- Greta Garbo – Born and raised in Sweden. Became a U.S. citizen in 1951.
- Greer Garson – Born and raised in the United Kingdom. Became a U.S. citizen in 1951.
- Melissa George – Born and raised in Australia. Became a U.S. citizen in 2008.
- Jessalyn Gilsig – Born and raised in Canada. Became a U.S. citizen in 2013.
- Shenae Grimes – Born and raised in Canada. Became a U.S. citizen in 2019.
- Julie Gonzalo – Born in Argentina. Became a U.S. citizen in 2011.
- Emily Hampshire – Born and raised in Canada. Became a U.S. citizen in 2014.
- Joanna Hausmann – Born in the United Kingdom and raised in Venezuela. Became a U.S. citizen in 2012.
- Salma Hayek – Born and raised in Mexico. Became a U.S. citizen and a French citizen.
- Tricia Helfer – Born in Canada. Became a U.S. citizen in 2011.
- Zulay Henao – Born in Colombia, but raised in the U.S.
- Sitara Hewitt – Born and raised in Canada.
- Claire Holt – Born and raised in Australia. Became a U.S. citizen in 2019.
- Milla Jovovich – Born in the Soviet Union (modern-day Ukraine). Became a U.S. citizen in 1994.
- Stana Katic – Born in Canada.
- Violet Kemble-Cooper – Born and raised in the United Kingdom.
- Diane Kruger – Born and raised in West Germany. Became a U.S. citizen in 2013.
- Mila Kunis – Born and raised in the Soviet Union (modern-day Ukraine). Moved to the U.S. in 1991.
- Hedy Lamarr – Born and raised in Austria. Became a U.S. citizen in 1953.
- Elsa Lanchester
- Vicky Lane
- Angela Lansbury – Born and raised in the United Kingdom. Became a U.S. citizen in 1951.
- Eva Le Gallienne – Born in the United Kingdom. Became a U.S. citizen in 1927.
- Anna Lee
- Ruta Lee
- Rachelle Lefevre
- Eugenie Leontovich – Born and raised in Russia. Became a U.S. citizen in 1929.
- Margarita Levieva
- Bai Ling – Born and raised in China. Became a U.S. citizen in 1999.
- Kathleen Lockhart
- Celia Lovsky
- Camilla Luddington
- Ida Lupino – Born and raised in the United Kingdom. Became a U.S. citizen in 1948.
- Nola Luxford
- Sheila MacRae – Born and raised in the United Kingdom. Became a U.S. citizen in 1959.
- Mercedes Mason – Born in Sweden to parents from Iran. Became a U.S. citizen in 2016.
- Pamela Mason
- Ilona Massey – Born and raised in Hungary. Became a U.S. citizen in 1946.
- Ivana Miličević
- Marta Milans – Born in Spain. Became a U,S. citizen in 2020.
- Kristine Miller – Born in Argentina. Became a U.S. citizen in 1942.
- Juliet Mills – Born and raised in the United Kingdom. Became a U.S. citizen in 1975.
- Helen Mirren – Born and raised in England. Became a U.S. citizen in 2017.
- Poppy Montgomery
- Anya Monzikova
- Carrie-Anne Moss
- Alla Nazimova
- Pola Negri – Born in Poland. Became a U.S. citizen in 1951.
- Sylvia O'Brien
- Una O'Connor – Born and raised in Ireland. Became a U.S. citizen in 1952.
- Catherine O'Hara
- Maureen O'Hara – Born and raised in Ireland. Became a U.S. citizen in 1946
- Sandra Oh – Born in Canada. Became a U.S. citizen in 2018.
- Maureen O'Sullivan – Born in Ireland. Became a U.S. citizen in 1947.
- Ann-Margret Olsson – Born in Sweden. Became a U.S. citizen in 1949.
- Jessica Oyelowo – Born in the United Kingdom. Became a U.S. citizen in 2016.
- Bar Paly – Born in Russia, raised in Israel. Became a U.S. citizen in 2016.
- Katina Paxinou – Born in Greece. Became a U.S. citizen in 1951.
- Natalie Portman – Born in Israel, being an U.S. citizen from her birth through her mother
- Mary Pickford
- Christina Pickles
- Sasha Pieterse – Born in South Africa, but raised in the U.S. Became a U.S. citizen in 2001.
- Nathalia Ramos – Born in Spain. Became a U.S. citizen in 2016.
- Italia Ricci – Born and raised in Canada. Became a U.S. citizen in 2020.
- Natasha Richardson
- Lyda Roberti
- Elisabeth Röhm – Born in Germany, but raised in the U.S. Became a U.S. citizen in childhood.
- Olesya Rulin
- Elena Satine
- Caterina Scorsone
- Izabella Scorupco – Born in Poland, but raised in Sweden. Became a U.S. citizen in 2014.
- Jane Seymour – Born and raised in the United Kingdom. Became a U.S. citizen in 2005.
- Norma Shearer
- Jean Simmons – Born and raised in the United Kingdom. Became a U.S. citizen in 1956.
- Marina Sirtis
- Alexis Smith – Born in Canada. Became a U.S. citizen in 1939.
- Cobie Smulders – Born in Canada. Became a U.S. citizen in 2020.
- Anna Sten
- Tammin Sursok – Born in South Africa, raised in Australia. Became a U.S. citizen in 2019.
- Catherine Sutherland - Born in Australia. Became a U.S. citizen in 2001.
- Jessica Tandy – Born and raised in the United Kingdom. Became a U.S. citizen in 1952.
- Holly Taylor
- Charlize Theron – Born in South Africa. Became a U.S. citizen in 2007.
- Marsha Thomason – Born and raised in the United Kingdom. Became a U.S.citizen in 2012.
- Emeraude Toubia – Born in Canada, but raised in the U.S.
- Tracey Ullman – Born in the United Kingdom. Became a U.S. citizen in 2006.
- Angélica Vale – Born and raised in Mexico. Became a U.S. citizen in 2016.
- Diana Van der Vlis
- Nia Vardalos
- Sofía Vergara – Born and raised in Colombia. Became a U.S. citizen in 2014.
- Vanessa Villela – Born in Mexico. Became a U.S. citizen in 2017.
- Sonya Walger – Born and raised in the United Kingdom. Became a U.S. citizen in 2013.
- Rachel Weisz – Born in the United Kingdom. Became a U.S. citizen in 2011.
- May Whitty
- Fay Wray – Born and raised in Canada. Became a U.S. citizen in 1933.

=== Comedians ===
- Samantha Bee – Born and raised in Canada. Became a U.S. citizen in 2014.
- Michael Blackson – Born and raised in Liberia. Became a U.S. citizen in 2021.
- Selma Diamond – Born and raised in Canada.
- Bob Hope – Born in the United Kingdom and arrived in USA in 1907.
- Tyler Labine – Born and raised in Canada.
- John Oliver – Born and raised in the United Kingdom. Became a U.S. citizen in 2019.
- Yakov Smirnoff – Born in the Soviet Union (modern-day Ukraine). Became a U.S. citizen in 1986.

=== Dancers ===
- Mikhail Baryshnikov – Born and raised in the Soviet Union (modern-day Latvia). Became a U.S. citizen in 1986.
- Artem Chigvintsev – Born in the Soviet Union (modern-day Russia). Became a U.S. citizen in 2014.
- Maksim Chmerkovskiy – Born and raised in the Soviet Union (modern-day Ukraine) and arrived in USA in 1994.
- Valentin Chmerkovskiy – Born and raised in the Soviet Union (modern-day Ukraine) and arrived in USA in 1994.
- Sasha Farber – Born in Russia, grew up in Australia. Became a U.S. citizen in 2020.
- Gonzalo Garcia – Born in Spain. Became a U.S. citizen in 2017.
- Alexander Godunov – Born in the Soviet Union (modern-day Russia). Became a U.S. citizen in 1987.
- José Limón – Born in Mexico. Became a U.S. citizen in 1946.
- Peta Murgatroyd – Born in New Zealand. Raised in Australia. Became a U.S. citizen in 2019.
- Gleb Savchenko – Born and raised in the Soviet Union (modern-day Russia).
- Christine Shevchenko – Born and raised in the Soviet Union (modern-day Ukraine).
- Emma Slater – Born and raised in the United Kingdom. Became a U.S. citizen in 2020.
- Karina Smirnoff – Born in the Soviet Union (modern-day Ukraine). Became a U.S. citizen shortly after immigrating in 1993.
- Tamara Toumanova – Born and raised in Russia. Became a U.S. citizen in 1943.
- Louis Van Amstel – Born and raised in Netherlands. Became a U.S. citizen in 1999.

=== Directors ===
- Frank Capra – Born in Italy. Became a U.S. citizen in 1920.
- Michael Curtiz – Born and raised in Austria-Hungary (modern-day Hungary). Became a U.S. citizen in 1933.
- John Farrow – Born in Australia. Became a U.S. citizen in 1947.
- Alejandro Gómez Monteverde – Born and raised in Mexico. Became a U.S. citizen in 2007.
- Alfred Hitchcock – Born and raised in England. Became a U.S. citizen in 1955.
- Anatole Litvak – Born and raised in Russia (modern-day Ukraine). Became a U.S. citizen in 1942.
- Mira Nair – Born and raised in India. Became a U.S. citizen in 2006.
- Otto Preminger – Born and raised in Austria-Hungary (modern-day Ukraine).
- Alik Sakharov – Born and raised in the Soviet Union (modern-day Uzbekistan).

=== Producers ===
- Dino De Laurentiis – Born and raised in Italy. Became a U.S. citizen in 1986.
- Bruce Lansbury – Born in the United Kingdom. Became a U.S. citizen in 1954.
- Edgar Lansbury – Born in the United Kingdom. Became a U.S. citizen in 1954.
- Lorne Michaels – Born in Canada. Became a U.S. citizen in 1987.

=== WWE ===
- Alberto Del Rio – Born in Mexico. Became a U.S. citizen in 2018.

== Law enforcement ==
- Joaquín "Jack" García
- John Timoney

== Media figures ==
=== Social media ===
- Hila Klein – Born in Israel. Became a U.S. citizen in 2019.
- Lele Pons – Born in Venezuela. Became a U.S. citizen in 2019.

=== Television ===
- Peter Arnett – Born and raised in New Zealand.
- Mariana Atencio – Born and raised in Venezuela. Became a U.S. citizen in 2020.
- Jillian Barberie – Born and raised in Canada. Became a U.S. citizen in 2011.
- David Frum – Born and raised in Canada.
- Brad Goreski – Born and raised in Canada.
- Yolanda Hadid – Born and raised in Netherlands. Became a U.S. citizen in 2013.
- Peter Jennings – Born and raised in Canada.
- Cesar Millan – Born and raised in Mexico. Became a U.S. citizen in 2009.
- Alex Trebek – Born and raised in Canada. Became a U.S. citizen in 1998.
- Laura Trevelyan – Born and raised in the United Kingdom.
- Richard Wolffe – Born and raised in the United Kingdom.

== Military ==
- Ming Chang – Born in China. Became a U.S. citizen after joining the U.S. navy.
- Louis Cukela – Born and raised in Austria-Hungary (modern-day Croatia).
- Florent Groberg – Born in France. Became a U.S. citizen in 2001.
- Khalifa Haftar – Born and raised in Libya.
- Mian Ghulam Jilani – Born and raised in Pakistan. Became a U.S. citizen in 1981.
- No Kum-sok – Born in modern-day North Korea. Immigrated to the U.S. in 1954 and later became a citizen.
- Henry Landau – Born in South Africa. Became a U.S. citizen in 1933.
- James I. Mestrovitch – Born and raised in Austria-Hungary (modern-day Montenegro).
- Thomas R. Sargent III – Born in United Kingdom. Became a U.S. citizen in 1930.
- John Shalikashvili – Born and raised in Poland.
- Michael Strank – Born in Czechoslovakia (modern-day Slovakia). Became a U.S. citizen in 1935.
- Peter Tomich – Born and raised in Austria-Hungary (modern-day Bosnia and Herzegovina)
- Lauri Törni – Born and raised in Finland. Became a U.S. citizen in 1957.
- Friedrich Wilhelm von Steuben – Born in Germany. Became a U.S. citizen following the American Revolutionary War.

== Musicians ==
- Lina Abarbanell
- Josh Beech – Born in the United Kingdom. Became a U.S. citizen in 2019.
- Bleona – Born and raised in Albania. Became a U.S. citizen in 2011.
- Igor Butman
- David Byrne – Born and raised in Scotland. Became a U.S. citizen in 2012.
- Celia Cruz
- Sheena Easton – Born and raised in Scotland. Became a U.S. citizen in 1992.
- Atilla Engin
- Flea
- Lita Ford
- Selim Giray
- Gregory Alan Isakov
- Tomo Miličević – Born in Yugoslavia (modern-day Bosnia and Herzegovina). Became a U.S. citizen in the 1990s.
- French Montana – Born in Morocco. Became a U.S. citizen in 2018.
- Joon Park
- Neil Peart
- Trevor Rabin – Born and raised in South Africa. Became a U.S. citizen in 1991.
- Mehmet Ali Sanlıkol
- Carlos Santana – Born in Mexico. Became a U.S. citizen in 1965.
- Rudy Sarzo – Born in Cuba. Became a U.S. citizen in 1981.
- Gene Simmons – Born in Israel. Became a U.S. citizen in 1966.
- Slash – Born in the United Kingdom. Became a U.S. citizen in 1996.
- Yma Sumac – Born and raised in Peru. Became a U.S. citizen in 1955.
- Pinar Toprak
- Alex Van Halen – Born in the Netherlands. Became a U.S. citizen in 1962.
- Eddie Van Halen – Born in the Netherlands. Became a U.S. citizen in 1962.

=== Singers ===
- Paul Anka – Born in Canada. Became a U.S. citizen in 1990.
- Alex Boyé – Born and raised in the United Kingdom. Became a U.S. citizen in 2012.
- Dewey Bunnell
- Camila Cabello – Born in Cuba. Became a U.S. citizen in 2008.
- David Coverdale – Born and raised in England. Became a U.S. citizen in 2007.
- Gloria Estefan – Born in Cuba. Became a U.S. citizen in 1974
- Billy Idol – Born and raised in the United Kingdom. Became a U.S. citizen in 2018.
- John Lydon – Born in the United Kingdom. Became a U.S. citizen in 2013.
- Dave Matthews – Born and raised in South Africa. Became a U.S. citizen in 1980.
- Alanis Morissette – Born and raised in Canada. Became a U.S. citizen in 2005.
- Tinka Milinović – Born and raised in Bosnia and Herzegovina. Became a U.S. citizen at the age of 18.
- Carly Smithson – Born in Ireland. Became a U.S. citizen in 2017.
- Yoo Seung-jun – Born and raised in South Korea. Became a U.S. citizen in 2002.
- Jon Anderson – Born and raised in the United Kingdom. Became a U.S. citizen in 2009.
- Keith Urban
- Neil Young

=== Composers ===
- Irving Berlin
- Monte Carlo – Born and raised in Denmark. Became a U.S. citizen in 1914.
- Sansan Chien
- Percy Faith – Born and raised in Canada. Became a U.S. citizen in 1945.
- Loris Ohannes Chobanian
- Erich Wolfgang Korngold – Born in Austria-Hungary (modern-day Czech Republic). Became a U.S. citizen in 1943.
- Miklós Rózsa – Born in Austria-Hungary (modern-day Hungary). Became a U.S. citizen in 1946.
- Kike Santander – Born and raised in Colombia. Became a U.S. citizen in 2004.
- Lalo Schifrin – Born and raised in Argentina. Became a U.S. citizen in 1969.
- Arnold Schoenberg
- Karl Weigl – Born and raised in Austria. Became a U.S. citizen in 1943.

=== Pianists ===
- Fahir Atakoğlu
- Victor Borge – Born and raised in Denmark. Became a U.S. citizen in 1948.
- Vladimir Horowitz – Born and raised in the Russian Empire (modern-day Ukraine). Became a U.S. citizen in 1944.
- Mischa Levitzki
- Rene Paulo
- Arthur Rubinstein – Born in Poland. Became a U.S. citizen in 1946.
- Nina Svetlanova
- George Tremblay

== Politics ==
=== Activists ===
- Rushan Abbas
- Carlos Arredondo – Born in Costa Rica. Became a U.S. citizen in 2006.
- Greta Beer – Born in Romania. Became a U.S. citizen in 1956.
- Ada Bello – Born in Cuba. Became a U.S. citizen in 1969.
- Pamela Harriman – Born in the United Kingdom. Became a U.S. citizen in 1971.
- Maria L. de Hernández
- Ayaan Hirsi Ali

=== Diplomats ===
- Zbigniew Brzezinski – Born in Poland. Became a U.S. citizen in 1958.

=== Political science ===
- Yascha Mounk
- Adam Ulam

=== Politicians ===
- Katcho Achadjian – Born in Lebanon to parents from Armenia. Became a U.S. citizen in 1982.
- Madeleine Albright – Born in Czechoslovakia (modern-day Czech Republic). Became a U.S. citizen in 1957.
- John Peter Altgeld
- Rudy Boschwitz
- Joseph Cao
- Salud Carbajal
- Peter Angelo Cavicchia
- Elaine Chao – Born in Taiwan. Became a U.S. citizen at the age of 19.
- Fernando Cheung
- Robert Dale Owen – Born in Scotland. Became a U.S. citizen in 1825.
- John N. Dempsey
- Lincoln Díaz-Balart
- William P. Fitzpatrick
- Columba Garnica Gallo (wife of Jeb Bush) – Born and raised in Mexico. Became a U.S. citizen in 1979.
- Amer Ghalib
- Jennifer Granholm – Born in Canada. Became a U.S. citizen in 1980.
- Pramila Jayapal – Born in India. Became a U.S. citizen in 2000.
- Henry Kissinger – Born in Germany. Became a U.S. citizen in 1943 while serving in the U.S. army
- Raja Krishnamoorthi
- Tom Lantos – Born in Hungary. Became a U.S. citizen in 1954.
- Zohran Mamdani – Born in Uganda to Indian immigrant parents. Became a U.S. citizen in 2018.
- Mel Martínez
- Paul O'Dwyer – Born in Ireland. Became a U.S. citizen in 1930.
- William O'Dwyer
- Victoria Spartz – Born in the Soviet Union (modern-day Ukraine). Became a U.S. citizen in 2006.
- Leland Yee

== Religious figures ==
- Chaim Zanvl Abramowitz
- Evangeline Booth
- Frances Xavier Cabrini – Born in the Austrian Empire (modern-day Italy). Became a U.S. citizen in 1909.
- Bhante Dharmawara
- Oscar C. Eliason – Born in Sweden. Became a U.S. citizen in 1915.
- Gavriel Holtzberg
- Menachem Mendel Schneerson
- Paramahansa Yogananda – Born and raised in India. Becamea U.S. citizen in 1949.

== Science and academia ==
=== Astronomy ===
- Bart Bok – Born and raised in Netherlands. Became a U.S. citizen in 1938.
- Margaret Burbidge – Born in the United Kingdom. Became a U.S. citizen in 1977.
- Betül Kaçar
- Janet Akyüz Mattei
- Feryal Özel
- Otto Struve – Born in the Russian Empire (modern-day Ukraine). Became a U.S. citizen in 1927.

=== Biology ===
- Ivet Bahar
- Salvador Luria – Born and raised in Italy. Became a U.S. citizen in 1947.
- Gökhan S. Hotamisligil
- Ahmet Yıldız

=== Chemistry ===
- Nihat Berker
- Albert Chan
- Basudeb DasSarma – Born in India (modern-day Bangladesh). Became a U.S. citizen in 1972.
- Aziz Sancar

=== Economics ===
- Abhijit Banerjee
- W. Michael Blumenthal – Born and raised in Germany. Became a U.S. citizen in 1952.
- Michele Boldrin
- John Kenneth Galbraith – Born and raised in Canada. Became a U.S. citizen in 1937.
- Faruk Gül
- Asim Ijaz Khwaja
- Murat Iyigun
- Naci Mocan
- Franco Modigliani – Born and raised in Italy. Became a U.S. citizen in 1946.
- Salih Neftçi
- Tayfun Sönmez

=== Engineering ===
- Roma Agrawal
- Ali Akansu
- Ilkay Altintas
- Viktor Belenko – Born and raised in Russia. Became a U.S. citizen in 1980.
- Lodewijk van den Berg – Born and raised in Netherlands. Became a U.S. citizen in 1975.
- Burcin Becerik-Gerber
- Wernher von Braun – Born in Germany. Became a U.S. citizen in 1955.
- Tuncer Cebeci
- Zeynep Çelik-Butler
- Philip K. Chapman – Born and raised in Australia. Became a U.S. citizen in the late 1960s.
- Kalpana Chawla – Born in India. Became a U.S. citizen in 1991.
- Ali Erdemir
- Okan Ersoy
- Walter Haeussermann – Born and raised in Germany. Became a U.S. citizen in 1954.
- Pınar Keskinocak
- Alexey Pajitnov
- Thuan Pham
- Jesco von Puttkamer – Born and raised in Germany. Became a U.S. citizen in 1967.
- Ben Rich
- Andy Thomas – Born and raised in Australia. Became a U.S. citizen in 1986.
- Mehmet Toner

=== Mathematics ===
- Asuman Aksoy
- Asuman Aksoy
- Lamberto Cesari – Born and raised in Italy. became a U.S. citizen in 1976.
- Bang-Yen Chen
- Samuel Eilenberg
- Ernst Hellinger – Born and raised in Germany. Became a U.S. citizen in 1944.
- Mark Kac – Born in the Russian Empire (modern-day Ukraine). Became a U.S. citizen in 1943.
- Leonid Khachiyan – Born and raised in the Soviet Union (modern-day Russia). Became a U.S. citizen in 2000.
- Emil Leon Post
- John von Neumann – Born and raised in Hungary. Became a U.S. citizen in 1937.
- Albert Nijenhuis – Born and raised in Netherlands. Became a U.S. citizen in 1959.
- Ida Rhodes
- Sema Salur
- Halil Mete Soner
- Stanisław Ulam – Born in Austria-Hungary (modern-day Ukraine). Became a U.S. citizen in 1941.

=== Medicine ===
- Gertie F. Marx – Born and raised in Germany. Immigrated to New York in 1937 and became a U.S. citizen sometime after.

=== Meteorology ===
- James Murdoch Austin – Born and raised in New Zealand. Became a U.S. citizen in 1946.

=== Philosophy ===
- Hannah Arendt
- Max Black – Born in Azerbaijan raised in the United Kingdom. Became a U.S. citizen in 1948.

=== Physics ===
- Ilesanmi Adesida
- Qanta A. Ahmed – Born and raised in the United Kingdom (specifically England). Became a U.S. citizen in 2015.
- Ernest Ambler – Born and raised in the United Kingdom (specifically England). Became a U.S. citizen in 1957.
- Muzaffer Atac
- Bülent Atalay
- Felix Bloch – Born and raised in Switzerland. Became a U.S. citizen in 1939.
- Asım Orhan Barut
- Ernest Courant
- F. J. Duarte
- Robley Dunglison – Born in the United Kingdom. Became a U.S. citizen in 1838.
- Taner Edis
- Albert Einstein – Born in Germany. Became a U.S. citizen in 1940.
- Federico Faggin – Born and raised in Italy. Became a U.S. citizen in 1968.
- Enrico Fermi – Born and raised in Italy. Became a U.S. citizen in 1944.
- André Frédéric Cournand – Born and raised in France. Became a U.S. citizen in 1941.
- Jim Yong Kim
- Burçin Mutlu-Pakdil
- Bennet Omalu – Born and raised in Nigeria. Became a U.S. citizen in 2015.
- Yuri Orlov – Born and raised in the Soviet Union (modern-day Russia). Became a U.S. citizen in 1993.
- Benjamin B. Rubinstein – Born in Finland. Became a U.S. citizen in 1957.
- Wolfgang Pauli – Born and raised in Austria-Hungary (modern-day Austria). Became a U.S. citizen in 1946.
- Horst Ludwig Störmer
- Leana Wen – Born in China. Became a U.S. citizen in 2003.
- Emil Wolf
- Xiaoxing Xi

=== Psychology ===
- Ozlem Ayduk
- Carola B. Eisenberg – Born in Argentina. Became a U.S. citizen in 1949.
- Erik Erikson
- Peter Harzem
- Boris M. Levinson – Born in the Russian Empire (modern-day Lithuania). Became a U.S. citizen in 1930.
- Renee Rabinowitz
- Douglas G. Stuart – Born in Australia. Became a U.S. citizen in 1961.
- Max Wertheimer

== Sports ==
=== American football ===
- Morten Andersen
- Gunther Cunningham – Born in Germany. Became a U.S. citizen in 2010.
- L. P. Ladouceur – Born and raised in Canada. Became a U.S. citizen in 2019.
- Arthur Mosse – Born in Ireland. Became a U.S. citizen in 1937.
- Christian Okoye
- Igor Olshansky
- Fuad Reveiz – Born in Colombia. Became a U.S. citizen in 1986.
- Jan Stenerud

=== Athletics ===
- Abdihakem Abdirahman – Born in Somalia. Became a U.S. citizen in 2000.
- Haydar Aşan
- Rai Benjamin
- Gretel Bergmann – Born in Germany. Became a U.S. citizen in 1942.
- Hillary Bor – Born and raised in Kenya. Became a U.S. citizen after joining the U.S. military.
- Dailis Caballero – Born and raised in Cuba. Become a U.S. citizen in 2019.
- Paul Chelimo – Born in Kenya. Became a U.S. citizen in 2014 while serving in the U.S. army.
- Kerron Clement – Born and raised in Trinidad and Tobago. Became a U.S. citizen in 2004.
- Colleen De Reuck – Born and raised in South Africa. Became a U.S. citizen in 2000.
- Sandra Farmer-Patrick
- Eddy Hellebuyck Born in Belgium. Became a U.S. citizen in 2000.
- Weini Kelati – Born in Eritrea. Became a U.S. citizen in 2021.
- Benard Keter
- Khalid Khannouchi – Born in Morocco. Became a U.S. citizen in 2000.
- Shadrack Kipchirchir
- Sally Kipyego – Born and raised in Kenya. Became a U.S. citizen in 2017.
- Leonard Korir
- Bernard Lagat – Born and raised in Kenya. Became a U.S. citizen in 2004.
- Lopez Lomong – Born and raised in Sudan (modern-day South Sudan. Became a U.S. citizen in 2007.
- Guor Marial
- Sydney Maree
- Diane Nukuri – Born in Burundi. Became a U.S. citizen in 2017.
- Nadia Prasad – Born in France. Became a U.S. citizen in 2000.
- Stanisława Walasiewicz – Born in the Russian Empire (modern-day Poland). Became a U.S. citizen in 1947.
- Chen Yueling
- Futsum Zienasellassie – Born in Eritrea. Became a U.S. citizen in 2016.

=== Baseball ===
- Jason Bay – Born in Canada. Became a U.S. citizen in 2009.
- Bert Blyleven – Born in Netherlands.
- Jorge Bonifacio – Born and raised in the Dominican Republic. Became a U.S. citizen in 2025.
- Orlando Cabrera – Born in Colombia. Became an U.S. citizen in 2011.
- Robinson Canó – Born and raised in the Dominican Republic. Became a U.S. citizen in 2012.
- Rod Carew – Born in Panama Canal Zone. Became a U.S. citizen in 2024.
- Carlos Carrasco – Born and raised in Venezuela. Became a U.S. citizen in 2016.
- Aroldis Chapman – Born in Cuba. Became a U.S. citizen in 2016.
- Eduardo Escobar – Born and raised in Venezuela. Became a U.S. citizen in 2023.
- Yunel Escobar – Born and raised in Cuba. Became a U.S. citizen in 2017.
- José Fernández – Born in Cuba. Became a U.S. citizen in 2015.
- Dick Fowler – Born in Canada. Became a U.S. citizen in 1949.
- Ozzie Guillén – Born and raised in Venezuela. Became a U.S. citizen in 2006.
- Félix Hernández – Born in Venezuela. Became a U.S. citizen in 2018.
- José Iglesias – Born in Cuba. Became a U.S. citizen in 2018.
- Leonys Martín – Born and raised in Cuba. Became a U.S. citizen in 2018.
- Oscar Mercado – Born in Colombia. Became a U.S. citizen in 2018.
- David Ortiz – Born and raised in the Dominican Republic. Became a U.S. citizen in 2008.
- Brayan Peña – Born and raised in Cuba. Became a U.S. citizen in 2009.
- Eddie Pérez – Born and raised in Venezuela. Became a U.S. citizen in 2014.
- Tony Pérez – Born and raised in Cuba. Became a U.S. citizen in 1971.
- Plácido Polanco – Born in the Dominican Republic. Became a U.S. citizen in 2008.
- Yasiel Puig – Born in Cuba. Became a U.S. citizen in 2019.
- Albert Pujols – Born in the Dominican Republic. Became a U.S. citizen in 2007.
- José Quintana – Born and raised in Colombia. Became a U.S. citizen in 2024.
- Hanley Ramírez – Born and raised in the Dominican Republic. Became a U.S. citizen in 2019.
- Manny Ramirez – Born in the Dominican Republic. Became a U.S. citizen in 2004.
- Mariano Rivera – Born and raised in Panama. Became a U.S. citizen in 2015.
- Fernando Rodney – Born and raised in the Dominican Republic. Became a U.S. citizen in 2018.
- Euclides Rojas – Born and raised in Cuba. Became a U.S. citizen in 2000.
- Chico Ruiz – Born in Cuba. Became a U.S. citizen in 1972.
- Carlos Santana – Born in the Dominican Republic. Became a U.S. citizen in 2019.
- Fernando Valenzuela – Born and raised in Mexico. Became a U.S. citizen in 2015.

=== Basketball ===
- Kristine Anigwe – Born in the United Kingdom to parents from Nigeria. Became a U.S. citizen in 2014.
- Geno Auriemma – Born in Italy. Became a U.S. citizen in 1994.
- Hank Beenders
- Rolando Blackman
- Bohdan Blyzniuk – Born and raised in Ukraine. Became a U.S. citizen in 2016.
- Brandon Clarke
- James Donaldson
- Joel Embiid
- Patrick Ewing
- Adonal Foyle – Born and raised in Saint Vincent and the Grenadines. Became a U.S. citizen in 2007.
- Olga Firsova – Born in the Soviet Union (modern-day Ukraine). Became a U.S. citizen in 2008.
- Ernie Grunfeld – Born in Romania. Became a U.S. citizen in 1976.
- Adnan Hodžić
- Zydrunas Ilgauskas – Born and raised in Lithuania. Became a U.S. citizen in 2013.
- Enes Kanter Freedom – Born in Switzerland raised in Turkey. Became a U.S. citizen in 2021.
- Andrei Kirilenko – Born and raised in Russia. Became a U.S. citizen in 2011.
- Damir Krupalija
- Tom Meschery
- Sean Marks – Born and raised in New Zealand. Became a U.S. citizen in 2007.
- Dikembe Mutombo
- Hakeem Olajuwon – Born and raised in Nigeria. Became a U.S. citizen in 1993.
- Ticha Penicheiro – Born and raised in Portugal. Became a U.S. citizen in 2013.
- Juan Ignacio Sánchez
- Goran Suton – Born in Bosnia and Herzegovina. Became a U.S. citizen in 2006.
- Mychal Thompson
- Tristan Thompson – Born and raised in Canada. Became a U.S. citizen in 2020.

=== Boxing ===
- Eduardo Garcia
- Kid Kaplan
- Dmitry Salita

=== Climbing ===
- Fritz Wiessner – Born and raised in Germany. Became a U.S. citizen in 1935.

=== Fencing ===
- Barbra Higgins – Born and raised in Panama. Became a U.S. citizen in the 1970s.

=== Figure skating ===
- Rafael Arutyunyan – Born and raised in the Soviet Union (modern-day Georgia). Became a U.S. citizen in 2019.
- Daniil Barantsev
- Nina Bates
- Tanith Belbin White – Born and raised in Canada. Became a U.S. citizen in 2005.
- Jane Bugaeva – Born in Russia. Became a U.S. citizen in 2007.
- Alexandr Chichkov
- Oleg Fediukov
- Mathew Gates
- Kyoko Ina
- Rena Inoue – Born and raised in Japan. Became a U.S. citizen in 2005.
- Chuen-Gun Lee
- Gustave Lussi – Born in Switzerland. Became a U.S. citizen in 1927.
- Alexandr Kirsanov
- Ksenia Makarova – Born in Russia. Became a U.S. citizen in 2013.
- Denis Petukhov – Born and raised in Russia. Became a U.S. citizen in 2005.
- Larisa Selezneva – Born and raised in the Soviet Union (modern-day Russia). Became a U.S. citizen in 2013.
- Gorsha Sur
- Peter Tchernyshev – Born and raised in the Soviet Union (modern-day Russia). Became a U.S. citizen in 2001.

=== Golf ===
- Tommy Armour – Born and raised in the United Kingdom, specifically Scotland. Became a U.S. citizen in 1942.
- Bobby Cruickshank
- Harry Cooper
- Jim Ferrier – Born and raised in Australia. Became a U.S. citizen in 1944.
- Jenny Lidback – Born in Peru to parents from Sweden. Became a U.S. citizen in 2003.
- Pearl Sinn – Born in South Korea. Became a U.S. citizen at the age of 14.
- Macdonald Smith – Born and raised in the United Kingdom, specifically Scotland. Became a U.S. citizen in 1918.
- Annika Sörenstam – Born and raised in Sweden. Became a U.S. citizen in 2006.

=== Gymnastics ===
- Svetlana Boginskaya
- Nadia Comăneci – Born and raised in Romania. Became a U.S. citizen in 2001.
- Annia Hatch – Born in Cuba. Became a U.S. citizen in 2001.
- Béla Károlyi (gymnastics coach) – Born in Hungary (modern-day Romania). Became a U.S. citizen in 1989.
- Márta Károlyi (gymnastics coach) – Born in Hungary (modern-day Romania). Became a U.S. citizen in 1989.
- Irina Kazakova
- Olga Korbut – Born and raised in the Soviet Union (modern-day Belarus). Became a U.S. citizen in 2000.
- Anna Kotchneva
- Valeri Liukin – Born in the Soviet Union (modern-day Kazakhstan). Became a U.S. citizen in 2000.
- Henrietta Ónodi – Born and raised in Hungary. Became a U.S. citizen later in life.
- Elena Piskun

=== Ice hockey ===
- Joseph Barss – Born in British India raised in Canada. Became a U.S. citizen in 1930.
- Martin Biron – Born and raised in Canada. Became a U.S. citizen in 2017.
- Martin Brodeur – Born and raised in Canada. Became a naturalized U.S. citizen in 2009
- Valeri Bure – Born and raised in Russia. Became a U.S. citizen in 2001.
- Bill Clement – Born and raised in Canada. Became a U.S. citizen in 2010.
- Tony Esposito – Born and raised in Canada. Became a U.S. citizen in 1981.
- Ruslan Fedotenko
- Mike Fisher – Born and raised in Canada. Became a U.S. citizen in 2019.
- Jean-Luc Grand-Pierre – Born and raised in Canada. Became a U.S. citizen in 2024.
- Wayne Gretzky
- Milan Hejduk – Born and raised in Czechoslovakia (modern-day Czech Republic). Became a U.S. citizen in 2016.
- Arthur Kaliyev
- Tom Karalis – Born and raised in Canada. Became a U.S. citizen following Ice Hockey retirement.
- Darius Kasparaitis
- Orest Kindrachuk – Born and raised in Canada to parents from Ukraine. Became a U.S. citizen in 2012.
- Eddie Lack – Born and raised in Sweden. Became a U.S. citizen in 2024.
- Ian Laperrière – Born and raised in Canada. Became a U.S. citizen in 2011.
- Claude Lemieux – Born and raised in Canada. Became a U.S. citizen in 2009.
- Mario Lemieux
- Joel Quenneville – Born and raised in Canada. Became a U.S. citizen in 2011.
- Chico Resch
- Ulf Samuelsson
- Teemu Selänne – Born and raised in Finland. Became a U.S. citizen in 2024.
- Joe Thornton – Born and raised in Canada. Became a U.S. citizen in 2009.
- Bryan Trottier
- Justin Williams – Born and raised in Canada. Became a U.S. citizen in 2017.

=== Mixed martial arts ===
- Rafael dos Anjos – Born and raised in Brazil. Became a U.S. citizen in 2019.
- Andrei Arlovski
- Vitor Belfort – Born and raised in Brazil. Became a U.S. citizen in 2018.
- Cris Cyborg – Born and raised in Brazil. Became a U.S. citizen in 2016.
- Alp Ozkilic
- Anderson Silva – Born and raised in Brazil. Became a U.S. citizen in 2019.
- Glover Teixeira – Born and raised in Brazil. Became a U.S. citizen in 2020.
- Kamaru Usman
- Sodiq Yusuff – Born in Nigeria. Became a U.S. citizen in 2020.

=== Motor sports ===
- Aldo Andretti
- Mario Andretti – Born in Italy. Became a U.S. citizen in 1964.
- Luigi Chinetti – Born and raised in Italy. Became a U.S. citizen in 1950.

=== Rugby ===
- Takudzwa Ngwenya

=== Skateboarding ===
- Letícia Bufoni – Born and raised in Brazil. Became a U.S. citizen in 2021.
- Bob Burnquist – Born and raised in Brazil to an American father and a Brazilian mother.

=== Soccer / association football ===
- Freddy Adu – Born in Ghana. Became a U.S. citizen in 2003.
- Juan Agudelo – Born in Colombia. Arrived to the U.S. in 1999.
- Osvaldo Alonso – Born and raised in Cuba. Became a U.S. citizen in 2012.
- Vlatko Andonovski – Born in modern-day North Macedonia. Became a U.S. citizen in 2015.
- Hadji Barry – Born and raised in Guinea. Became a U.S. citizen in 2018.
- Fernando Clavijo – Born in Uruguay. Became a U.S. citizen in 1987.
- Jeff Cunningham – Born in Jamaica. Became a U.S. citizen in 2001.
- Emmanuel D'Andrea – Born in Venezuela, raised in Puerto Rico. Became a U.S. citizen at the age of 10.
- Mix Diskerud – Born in Norway to a Norwegian father and an American mother.
- Benny Feilhaber – Born in Brazil. Arrived in the U.S. in 1991.
- Elena Gracinda Santos – Born in South Africa. Moved to the.S. when she was a child.
- Baggio Hušidić – Born and raised in Yugoslavia (modern-day Bosnia and Herzegovina). Became a U.S. citizen while in college.
- Donna-Kay Henry – Born in Jamaica. Moved to the U.S. in 1999.
- Dema Kovalenko – Born and raised in the Soviet Union (modern-day Ukraine). Moved to the U.S. in 1992.
- Sydney Leroux – Born and raised in Canada. Moved to the U.S. in 2005.
- Carlos Llamosa – Born in Colombia. Became a U.S. citizen in 1998.
- Catarina Macario – Born in Brazil. Became a U.S. citizen in 2020.
- Kekuta Manneh – Born in Gambia. Became a U.S. citizen in 2016.
- Mick McDermott – Born and raised in the United Kingdom. Became a U.S. citizen in 1996.
- Janusz Michallik – Born in Poland. Became a U.S. citizen in 1991.
- Darlington Nagbe – Born in Liberia. Became a U.S. citizen in 2015.
- Teresa Noyola – Born in Mexico. Moved to the U.S. in 1993.
- Brian Quinn – Born and raised in the United Kingdom.
- Andrew Parkinson – Born and raised in South Africa. Moved to the U.S. in 1980.
- Hugo Pérez – Born in El Salvador. Became a U.S. citizen as a child.
- Preki – Born in Yugoslavia (modern-day Serbia). Became a U.S. citizen in 1996.
- Tab Ramos – Born and raised in Uruguay. Moved to the U.S. in 1977.
- David Regis – Born in Martinique. Became a U.S. citizen in 1998.
- Roy Wegerle – Born and raised in South Africa. Became a U.S. citizen in 1991.
- Gedion Zelalem – Born in Germany to parents from Ethiopia. Became a U.S. citizen in 2014.
- Kia Zolgharnain – Born in Iran. Became a U.S. citizen in 1994.

=== Swimming ===
- John Davies – Born and raised in Australia. Became a U.S. citizen in 1960.
- Mariya Koroleva – Born in the Soviet Union (modern-day Russia). Moved to the U.S. when she was a child.
- Lenny Krayzelburg – Born and raised in Ukraine. Became a U.S. citizen in 1995.
- Jay Litherland – Born and raised in Japan. Became a U.S. citizen while in high school.
- Philip Scholz – Born and raised in Germany. Became a U.S. citizen in 2007.
- Darian Townsend – Born and raised in South Africa. Became a U.S. citizen in 2014.
- Arkady Vyatchanin – Born and raised in Russia. Became a U.S. citizen in 2017.
- Otto Wahle – Born in the Austrian Empire (modern-day Austria). Became a U.S. citizen in 1906.
- Alberto Zorrilla – Born and raised in Argentina. Became a U.S. citizen in 1954.

=== Tennis ===
- Alex Bogomolov Jr. – Born and raised in the Soviet Union (modern-day Russia). Became a U.S. citizen in 2002.
- Kevin Curren – Born and raised in South Africa. Became a U.S. citizen 1985.
- Mariaan de Swardt – Born and raised in South Africa. Became a U.S. citizen in 2006.
- Amer Delić – Born and raised in Yugoslavia (modern-day Bosnia and Herzegovina). Became a U.S. citizen in 2003.
- Edward Dewhurst – Born and raised in Australia. Became a U.S. citizen in 1924.
- Cliff Drysdale – Born and raised in South Africa. Became a U.S. citizen following retirement of tennis career.
- Tommy Haas – Born and raised in West Germany, and then Germany. Became a U.S. citizen in 2010.
- Liezel Huber – Born in South Africa. Became a U.S. citizen in 2007.
- Anna Kournikova – Born in the Soviet Union (modern-day Russia). Became a U.S. citizen in 2010.
- Johan Kriek – Born in South Africa. Became a U.S. citizen in 1982.
- Denis Kudla – Born in Ukraine but raised in the U.S. Became a U.S. citizen during his childhood.
- Varvara Lepchenko – Born in the Soviet Union (modern-day Uzbekistan). Became a U.S. citizen in 2012.
- Ivan Lendl – Born and raised in Czechoslovakia (modern-day Czech Republic). Became a U.S. citizen in 1992.
- Tetiana Luzhanska – Born and raised in the Soviet Union (modern-day Ukraine). Became a U.S. citizen in 2012.
- Molla Mallory – Born and raised in Norway. Became a U.S. citizen in 1919.
- Martina Navratilova – Born and raised in Czechoslovakia (modern-day Czech Republic). Became a U.S. citizen in 1981.
- Alex Olmedo – Born in Peru. Became a U.S. citizen later in life.
- Bernarda Pera – Born and raised in Croatia. Became a U.S. citizen in 2013.
- Fred Perry – Born and raised in the United Kingdom. Became a U.S. citizen in 1939.
- Monica Seles – Born in Yugoslavia (modern-day Serbia). Became a U.S. citizen in 1994.
- Anna Tatishvili – Born in the country of Georgia (at the time of her birth was Soviet Union). Became a U.S. citizen in 2014.

=== Volleyball ===
- Bojana Todorović – Born and raised in Yugoslavia (modern-day Serbia). Arrived in the U.S. in 2000.

=== Weightlifting ===
- Mike Karchut – Born and raised in Germany.
- Richard Tom – Born in China. Moved to the U.S. when he was a child.
- Walter Zagurski – Born and raised in Lithuania.

=== Winter Sports ===
- Kaillie Humphries – Born and raised in Canada. Became a U.S. citizen in 2022.

=== Wrestling ===
- Edwin Bibby – Born and raised in the United Kingdom. Became a U.S. citizen in 1900.
- Drew McIntyre – Born and raised in Scotland. Became a U.S. citizen in 2023.
- Ildar Hafizov – Born and raised in Uzbekistan (at the time of his birth was Soviet Union). Became a U.S. citizen after enlisting in the U.S. Army in 2015.
- Rocky Johnson – Born and raised in Canada.
- Becky Lynch – Born and raised in Ireland. Became a U.S. citizen in 2024.
