= 2011 Ogun State House of Assembly election =

2015 Ogun State House of Assembly election

- April 26, 2011

All 26 seats in the Ogun State House of Assembly 14 seats needed for a majority
	Majority party
Leader	Suraj Adekunbi
Party	Action Congress of Nigeria
Leader's seat	Obafemi/Owode
Last election	26
Seats after	26
Seat change	Steady
Speaker before election
Hon. Samson O. Egbetokuni
Action Congress of Nigeria
Elected Speaker
Suraj Adekunbi
APC

The Ogun State House of Assembly election was held on April 26, 2011, to elect representatives to the state's House of Assembly. Of the 26 vacant seats, 18 were worn by the ACN, 5 by the PDP, and 3 by the PPN.

== Results ==
=== Abeokuta South I ===
ACN candidate Victor Oludotun Fasanya(Barr) won the election.

2011 Ogun State House of Assembly election
Party	Candidate	Votes	%
Action Congress of Nigeria	Hon. Fasanya, Victor Oludotun (Barr.)		

=== Abeokuta South II ===
ACN Candidate Hon. Allen-Taylor, Olufemi Wilfred won the election

2011 Ogun State House of Assembly election
Party	Candidate	Votes	%
Action Congress of Nigeria	Hon. Allen-Taylor, Olufemi Wilfred		

=== Odeda ===
ACN Candidate Hon. Elemide, Oludaisi Olusegun won the election

2011 Ogun State House of Assembly election
Party	Candidate	Votes	%
Action Congress of Nigeria	Hon. Elemide, Oludaisi Olusegun		

=== Abeokuta North ===
ACN Candidate Hon. Ojodu, Olayiwola Jamiu (Pastor) won the election

2011 Ogun State House of Assembly election
Party	Candidate	Votes	%
Action Congress of Nigeria	Hon. Ojodu, Olayiwola Jamiu		

=== Obafemi Owode ===
ACN candidate Hon. Anifowose, Elizabeth F. (Mrs.) won the election

2011 Ogun State House of Assembly election
Party	Candidate	Votes	%
Africa Cup of Nations	Hon. Anifowose, Elizabeth F. (Mrs.)		
