= Osofisan =

Osofisan is a surname. Notable people with the surname include:

- Adenike Osofisan (born 1950), Nigerian computer scientist
- Femi Osofisan (born 1946), Nigerian writer
