= Victor Ajayi =

Nigerian cybersecurity expert and musician

- Born: Victor Ayobami Ajayi; July 14, 1988 (age 38); Jebba, Kwara State, Nigeria
- Education: Federal Polytechnic, Ilaro (OND)
- Occupations: Cybersecurity expert, musician

Victor Ajayi (born 14 July 1988) is a Nigerian cybersecurity expert and musician.

== Biography ==
Victor Ayobami Ajayiaudio was born on 14 July 1988 at Jebba, Kwara State. Having spent his childhood years between Kwara state, Kogi State, Ogun State and Lagos State, Ajayi attended St. Peter's Nursery and Primary School, Mopa, Kogi State and Itolu Community High School, Ilaro, Ogun State for his primary and secondary education. Ajayi obtained his ordinary national diploma (OND) at Federal Polytechnic, Ilaro and Ladoke Akintola University of Technology (LAUTECH) for his bachelor's degree in Electrical / Electronics Engineering and Engineering Institute of Technology, for his master's degree in Industrial Automation.

Ajayi worked at Chevron Corporation from 2012 to 2021, as an instrument control system specialist, cyber security specialist and in his final years, a senior cyber security engineer. He later moved to Ernst & Young as a cyber security manager and left in December 2022. Since then, Ajayi has been working in private service while also serving as a cyber security mentor with Springboard, a US-based company.

As a musician, Ajayi goes by the name Veeesax.
