= 2015 Ogun State House of Assembly election =

- April 11, 2015

All 26 seats in the Ogun State House of Assembly 14 seats needed for a majority
	Majority party
Leader	Suraj Adekunbi
Party	APC
Leader's seat	Yewa North I
Last election	26
Seats after	26
Seat change	Steady
Speaker before election
Suraj Adekunbi
Action Congress of Nigeria
Elected Speaker
Suraj Adekunbi
APC

The 2015 Ogun State House of Assembly election was held on April 11, 2015, to elect members of the Ogun State House of Assembly in Nigeria. All the 26 seats were up for election in the Ogun State House of Assembly. APC won 17 seats, while PDP won 9 seat.

Upon the opening of the 8th State House of Assembly, Suraj Adekunbi (APC-Yewa North I) was elected as Speaker of the House while Olakunle Oluomo (APC-Ifo II) and Asiwaju Yinka Mafe (APC-Sagamu I) became Deputy Speaker and House Leader, respectively.

== Results ==
=== Abeokuta South I ===
APC candidate Victor Fasanya won the election.

2015 Ogun State House of Assembly election
Party	Candidate	Votes	%
APC	Victor Fasanya		
APC hold			

=== Abeokuta South II ===
APC candidate Olowofuja Nureni won the election.

2015 Ogun State House of Assembly election
Party	Candidate	Votes	%
APC	Olowofuja Nureni		
APC hold			

=== Odeda ===
APC candidate Sogbein Yetunde won the election.

2015 Ogun State House of Assembly election
Party	Candidate	Votes	%
APC	Sogbein Yetunde		
APC hold			

=== Abeokuta North ===
APC candidate Ojodu Olayiwola won the election.

2015 Ogun State House of Assembly election
Party	Candidate	Votes	%
APC	Ojodu Olayiwola		
APC hold			

=== Obafemi-Owode ===
APC candidate Tunde Sanusi won the election.

2015 Ogun State House of Assembly election
Party	Candidate	Votes	%
APC	Tunde Sanusi		
APC hold			

=== Ifo I ===
APC candidate Oluomo Taiwo won the election.

2015 Ogun State House of Assembly election
Party	Candidate	Votes	%
APC	Oluomo Taiwo		
APC hold			

=== Ifo II ===
APC candidate Ganiyu Oyedeji won the election.

2015 Ogun State House of Assembly election
Party	Candidate	Votes	%
APC	Ganiyu Oyedeji		
APC hold			

=== Ewekoro ===
APC candidate Jolaoso Israel won the election.

2015 Ogun State House of Assembly election
Party	Candidate	Votes	%
APC	Jolaoso Israel		
APC hold			

=== Ijebu North II ===
APC candidate Oludare Kadiri won the election.

2015 Ogun State House of Assembly election
Party	Candidate	Votes	%
APC	Oludare Kadiri		
APC hold			

=== Ogun Waterside ===
APC candidate Harrison Adeyemi won the election.

2015 Ogun State House of Assembly election
Party	Candidate	Votes	%
APC	Harrison Adeyemi		
APC hold			

=== Odogbolu ===
APC candidate Adebowale Oladimeji won the election.

2015 Ogun State House of Assembly election
Party	Candidate	Votes	%
APC	Adebowale Oladimeji		
APC hold			

=== Sagamu I ===
APC candidate Mafe Adeyinka won the election.

2015 Ogun State House of Assembly election
Party	Candidate	Votes	%
APC	Mafe Adeyinka		
APC hold			

=== Ikenne ===
APC candidate Samuel Olusola won the election.

2015 Ogun State House of Assembly election
Party	Candidate	Votes	%
APC	Samuel Olusola		
APC hold			

=== Remo North ===
APC candidate Adebiyi Adeleye won the election.

2015 Ogun State House of Assembly election
Party	Candidate	Votes	%
APC	Adebiyi Adeleye		
APC hold			

=== Yewa North I ===
APC candidate Suraj Adekunbi won the election.

2015 Ogun State House of Assembly election
Party	Candidate	Votes	%
APC	Suraj Adekunbi		
APC hold			

=== Ado/Odo/Ota I ===
APC candidate Aina Nurudeen won the election.

2015 Ogun State House of Assembly election
Party	Candidate	Votes	%
APC	Aina Nurudeen		
APC hold			

=== Ado/Odo/Ota II ===
APC candidate Bankole Olusola won the election.

2015 Ogun State House of Assembly election
Party	Candidate	Votes	%
APC	Bankole Olusola		
APC hold			

=== Ijebu North I ===
PDP candidate Bowale Solaja won the election.

2015 Ogun State House of Assembly election
Party	Candidate	Votes	%
PDP	Bowale Solaja		
PDP hold			

=== Ijebu-East ===
PDP candidate Oyenuga Adejuwon won the election.

2015 Ogun State House of Assembly election
Party	Candidate	Votes	%
PDP	Oyenuga Adejuwon		
PDP hold			

=== Ijebu North East ===
PDP candidate Olujimi James won the election.

2015 Ogun State House of Assembly election
Party	Candidate	Votes	%
PDP	Olujimi James		
PDP hold			

=== Ijebu-Ode ===
PDP candidate Alausa Olawale won the election.

2015 Ogun State House of Assembly election
Party	Candidate	Votes	%
PDP	Alausa Olawale		
PDP hold			

=== Sagamu II ===
PDP candidate Soyebo Mojeed won the election.

2015 Ogun State House of Assembly election
Party	Candidate	Votes	%
PDP	Soyebo Mojeed		
PDP hold			

=== Imeko-Afon ===
PDP candidate Akingbade Jemili won the election.

2015 Ogun State House of Assembly election
Party	Candidate	Votes	%
PDP	Akingbade Jemili		
PDP hold			

=== Egbado South/Ilaro/Owode ===
PDP candidate Akintayo Julianah won the election.

2015 Ogun State House of Assembly election
Party	Candidate	Votes	%
PDP	Akintayo Julianah		
PDP hold			

=== Idiroko/Ipokia ===
PDP candidate Ojo Adebowale won the election.

2015 Ogun State House of Assembly election
Party	Candidate	Votes	%
PDP	Ojo Adebowale		
PDP hold			

=== Yewa North II ===
PDP candidate Oduntan Atanda won the election.

2015 Ogun State House of Assembly election
Party	Candidate	Votes	%
PDP	Oduntan Atanda		
PDP hold			
