= Adenike Osofisan =

Nigerian academic

Adenike Osofisan FNIM, FNCS, CITP

Professor

Personal details
- Born: Adenike Oyinlola Osofisan; 11 March 1950 (age 76) Osogbo
- Citizenship: Nigeria
- Education: Obafemi Awolowo University (Bachelor of Science in Computer Science & Economics); Georgia Institute of Technology ( Master of Science in Information and Computer Science); Obafemi Awolowo University (Doctor of Philosophy in Computer Science); University of Ibadan (MBA in Account and Finance)
- Occupation: academician, researcher, computer scientist
- Known for: Being the first African woman to become a Computer science professor

Adenike Osofisan (born 11 March 1950), is a Nigerian academician and computer scientist, who specializes in data mining and knowledge management. She is the first Nigerian woman to hold a Ph.D. in Computer science, a feat she accomplished in 1989. In 2006, she became a full professor at University of Ibadan, a promotion that made her the first African woman to become a Computer Science professor.

== Early life and education ==
Osofisan had her secondary education at Fiwasaiye Girls' Grammar School, Akure and Comprehensive High School, Ayetoro (1968). Between 1971 and 1976, she got her first degree from University of Ile-Ife, obtaining a federal government scholarship throughout most of her university years. She then proceeded to Georgia Institute of Technology in 1978, obtaining a master's degree in Information and Computer Science in 1979. Her PhD thesis on Data Processing Model for a Multi-access Computer Communication Network was completed in 1989 at the Obafemi Awolowo University under the supervision of Adebayo Akinde. In 1993, she completed her Master of Business Administration in Accounts and Finance from University of Ibadan, with her dissertation on An Asset Portfolio Management Model for Nigerian Commercial Banks: A Case Study, graduating as the best MBA student for the year.

== Career ==
=== Lecturing career ===
Osofisan began her lecturing career at The Polytechnic, Ibadan in 1979. Over the next few years, she rose to become the dean of Faculty of Science at the same institution. In 1999, she joined University of Ibadan and immediately began to serve as the acting head of department of computer science. In 2003, she earned promotion to the rank of associate professor. She earned a full professor chair in 2006. She has also had visiting professorial stints at Lagos State University.

== Membership of professional bodies ==
*Member Board of Trustees of Nigeria Internet Registration Association (NIRA)

*Former Member of Nigeria Mathematical Centre and Nigeria Institute of Management (NIM) Councils and now current

*Member of their Academic Boards.

*Member of Africa Academic Board of SAP (Systems, Applications, and Products in Data Processing).

Currently, Adenike is the Director of University of Ibadan School of Business (UISB) as the foundation Director. She was elected as the First Female Provost Nigeria Computer Society College of Fellows in July 2017.

=== Recognition ===
Osofisan is a recipient of several fellowships including "Nigeria Institute of Management" (1997), "Computer Association of Nigeria" (1998) and "Nigeria Computer Society" (life member, 2014). She is also the pioneer president of "Nigerian Women in Information Technology" (2003). From 2005 to 2009, she became the first female president and chairman of governing council of "Computer Professionals Registration Council of Nigeria". She was inducted into the Nigeria Women Hall of Fame on June 10, 2019 in Abuja.

=== Publications and commentaries ===
A 2009 study, which focused on the current digital divide as regards information technology in Nigeria is indexed top on Google scholar, her research revisited the challenges facing the adoption of digital technologies in Nigeria, in relation to what is being done in developed countries. She also recommended steps and policies that will hasten embracing and implementation of digital standards in the Nigerian ecosystem. The research is published in "International Journal of Global Business".

Following the economic recession due to over-dependence on petroleum exports and dwindling dollar prices, Osofisan urged the Nigerian government to utilize the ICT sector as it has so much to contribute to Nigerian economy if proper investment are put into it, she noted that despite the challenges being faced, 12 million jobs were created by the sector between 2012 and 2016. The remark was given at the 9th Annual Forum of Laureates of the Nigerian National Order of Merit in Abuja.

== List of articles ==
- Empirical Study of Factors Affecting the Effectiveness of Software Inspection: A Preliminary Report
- On the Origins of Advance Fee Fraud Electronic Mails: A Technical Investigation Using Internet Protocol Address Tracer
- An Empirical Comparative Study of Checklist based and Ad Hoc Code Reading Techniques in a Distributed Groupware Environment
- Bridging the Digital Divide: The Nigerian Journey So Far
- Industry Perception Of The Software Inspection Process : Nigeria Software Industry As A Case Study
- Evaluation of Predictive Data Mining Algorithms in Erythemato-Squamous Disease Diagnosis
- Your Development Team: A Fulcrum for Successful Migration to Agile.
- Representation of Knowledge Resource in the context of Economic Intelligence Systems

== See also ==
- Temiloluwa Prioleau
- Babatunde Adetokunbo Sofoluwe
- Unoma Ndili Okorafor
