= Pahayi =

- Town
- Location in Nigeria
- Coordinates: 6°50′49″N 2°56′17″E
- Country: Nigeria
- State: Ogun State
- LGA: Yewa South
- Time zone: UTC+1 (WAT)

Pahayi is a town in Yewa South local government area, Ogun State, Nigeria. It is located near Ilaro, not far from the border with Benin. Pahayi was one of the towns which was historically incorporated into the Egbado Protectorate under the Dahomians. It contains an elementary school and is linked by road to neighboring towns. The Orita Pahayi Modern Shopping Centre was completed in the 1990s. The inhabitants, mainly Yoruba people, are noted for their Wooro music, a type of music which is a "combination of all other music associated with Gelede, Ogun and Sango Festival." Apostle 'Bisi Emmanuel Ekunola emerged new monarch of Pahayi-Yewa November 16, 2021
