= Bolojo =

African music genre and type of dance

- Native name: Bọ̀lọ̀jọ̀
- Cultural origins: Late 1970s, Yewa people of Nigeria
- Typical instruments: Gbedu drum, Omele drum, shaworo drum, gangan, bàtá drum

Bọ̀lọ̀jọ̀ is an African dancing and popular musical style among the Yewa Yoruba clans situated in the western regions of Ogun State, Nigeria and other closely linked Yoruba subgroups in the nearby Plateau Department of Benin.

It is mostly featured in festivals, parties and in Gelede shows.

Beninese singer Zeynab Habib is also known for her popular recreation of Bolojo dances.
