= James I. Mestrovitch =

United States Army soldier (1894–1918)

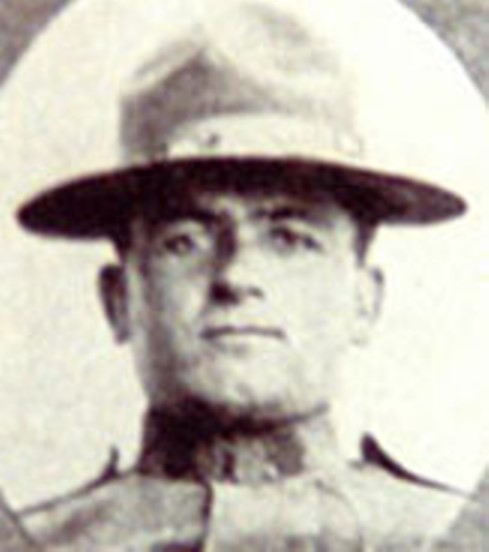
- Medal of Honor recipient
- Born: Joko Meštrović; May 22, 1894; Đuraševići, Austria-Hungary (modern-day Montenegro)
- Died: November 4, 1918 (aged 24); Fismes, France
- Burial place: Saint Jovan Serbian Orthodox Church, Đuraševići
- Military career
- Allegiance: United States of America
- Branch: United States Army
- Service years: 1916–1918
- Rank: Sergeant
- Nickname: "Jack"
- Service number: 1243675
- Units: Company C, 111th Infantry, 28th Division
- Conflicts: Pancho Villa Expedition; World War I; Battle of Fismes and Fismette; Meuse–Argonne offensive †
- Awards: Medal of Honor

Sergeant James I. Mestrovitch (May 22, 1894 – November 4, 1918) was a United States Army soldier who received the Medal of Honor, America's highest military decoration, for his valiant actions in World War I.

== Biography ==
Mestrovitch, an ethnic Serb, was born Joko Meštrović in Đuraševići, near Tivat, Kingdom of Dalmatia, Austria-Hungary (modern-day Montenegro) and after immigrating to the United States in 1911 he lived in Fresno, California.

He enlisted in the Pennsylvania Army National Guard's 18th Infantry in 1916 in Pittsburgh, Pennsylvania. Private Mestrovich was deployed along the Mexican border in support of the 1916 Punitive Expedition with the Pennsylvania National Guard, where his skill and experience as a soldier saw him promoted to corporal. Mestrovich was interviewed by newspaper reporters and attributed his patriotism and service as a debt repayment for the work of American doctors treating the typhoid epidemic in his native Serbia in 1914, the same year World War I began in Europe.

On April 13, 1917, a week after the American entry into World War I, the 18th Pennsylvania Infantry was called by the federal government to guard vital wartime industry in western Pennsylvania. A short time later, the men found themselves shipped to Camp Hancock, Georgia. Here, the Pittsburgh Regiment joined with the men of the 6th Pennsylvania Infantry from Philadelphia and surrounding counties to form the new 111th Infantry Regiment, part of the 28th Division. The division was deployed overseas to the Western Front in May 1918.

On August 10, 1918, while his unit was engaged in the town of Fismette, France, Sergeant Mestrovich saw his company commander, Captain James Williams, fall wounded as they moved through the ruins of the city. Without regard for his own safety, Mestrovich charged forward through a hail of machine-gun fire and falling artillery shells to rescue Williams, returning to a concealed position to provide life-saving first aid. For this action, he would become the 28th Division's first Medal of Honor recipient. Mestrovich was wounded in the fighting where he performed his heroic deed and initially reported as killed in action. He wrote to his uncle back in Fresno, telling him of being shot by machine-gun fire and recuperating in the hospital, stating, "They operated twice on me, and in another month I think I will be just as good as I was and ready for the front again."

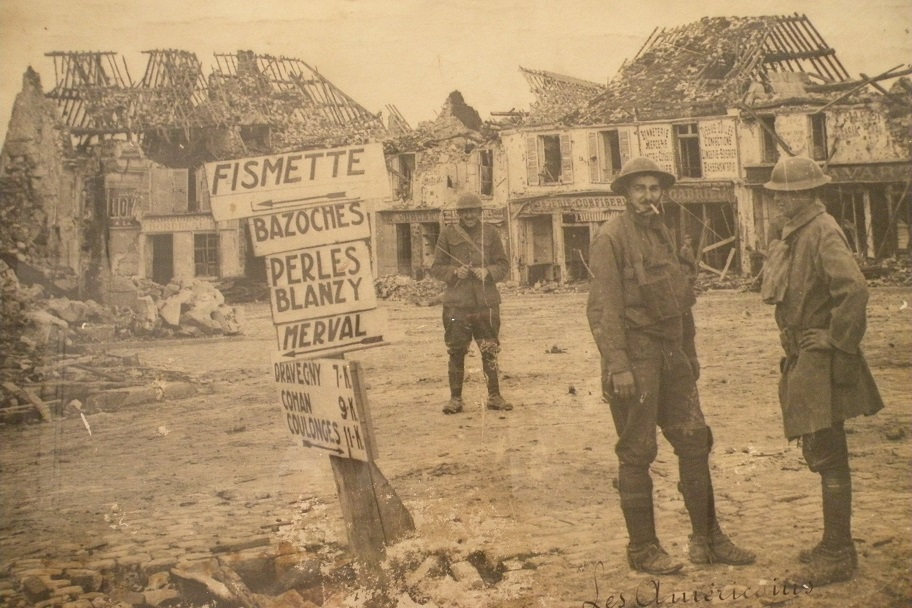
US Troops in Fismette, September 1918

He did recover and return to the 111th Infantry, but as fighting raged in the Meuse Argonne, Sergeant Mestrovich fell in action on November 4, 1918, with nearly 50 other men from the 111th, when their battalion encountered a concealed machine-gun position during a reconnaissance patrol just a week before the Armistice with Germany ended hostilities.

Sergeant Mestrovich's Medal of Honor citation reads as follows:

Seeing his company commander lying wounded 30 yards in front of the line after his company had withdrawn to a sheltered position behind a stone wall, Sgt. Mestrovitch voluntarily left cover and crawled through heavy machinegun and shell fire to where the officer lay. He took the officer upon his back and crawled to a place of safety, where he administered first-aid treatment, his exceptional heroism saving the officer's life.

Sergeant James Mestrovich's body was returned home to his mother in 1925 in the town of Boka, now part of Montenegro. He was buried in the cemetery of Serbian Orthodox Church of St. John in his home village of Đuraševići near Tivat. That same year the US mission to Split visited Mestrovich's mother and presented her with his Medal of Honor in the presence of a full honor guard.

A new biography titled He’s Alive! – Sergeant James I. Mestrovitch (1243675), written by Živojin Žika Petrović, was published in English in November 2025. The book examines the life of James I. Mestrovitch, from his early years in Montenegro and immigration to the United States to his service in World War I as a member of the Pennsylvania National Guard.

== See also ==
- List of Medal of Honor recipients for World War I
