= Ilaro Stadium =

Sports venue in Ilaro, Nigeria

Coordinates: 6°52′00″N 3°00′08″E

Ilaro Stadium is a multi-use stadium in Ilaro, Nigeria. Built in 2008, it is currently used mostly for football matches and is a home stadium for Gateway F.C. The stadium has a capacity of 12,000 people. The stadium is currently located at Idogo Road in Ilaro.
