= Ilaro =

Town in Ogun State, Nigeria

Coordinates: 6.89°N 3.017°E

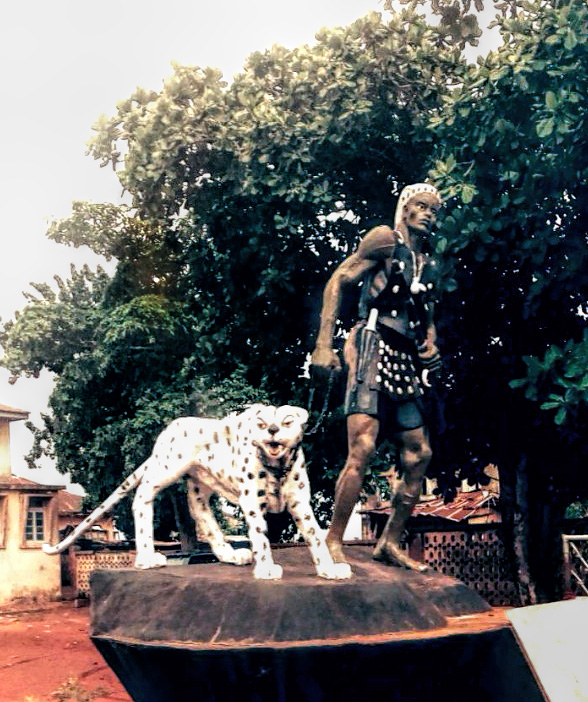
A statue of the warrior Orona in Ilaro

Ilaro is a town in Ogun State, Nigeria. It was founded in the 18th century by Aro, a warrior who migrated from Oyo, and its name is derived from Ilu Aro, meaning the settlement of Aro.

Agriculture has historically been important to the Yewa/Egbado people of the area, with crops including cocoa, coffee, kola nuts, maize, cassava and yams; timber processing and other local industries are also present. Cultural traditions in Ilaro include the Bolojo and Gelede dances and the annual Orona Ilaro Festival, associated with local traditions concerning the warrior Orona. The town is also home to the Federal Polytechnic Ilaro, which began teaching in 1979.

== Geography and demographics ==
Ilaro had an estimated population of 33,000 in 2008. A 2009 study described the town as having about 60,000 inhabitants based on a projection from the national census. City-Facts gives a population of 59,098 for 2015 and an area of 8.8 km^{2} (3.4 sq mi).

== Agriculture and industry ==
The Yewa/Egbado people historically farmed arable crops and cash crops like cocoa, coffee, kola nuts, oranges, and pineapples. Other farm products include maize, cassava, yams, okra, rice, bananas, plantains, water leaf, and spinach. Mineral resources found in Ilaro include phosphate and limestone. The Ilaro soils are mostly loamy and humus, rich in manure and elements that support the growth of crops at plantation and mechanized levels.

Due to a very thick forest, a major industry of the Ilaro people is the timber industry. There are several timber milling industries spread at the outskirts of the town for the production ofplanks and plywood for both local consumption and exportation.

Industries in Ilaro town include the local fufu and gari processing industries, the timber industries, the local Aso Oke weaving industry, paint industry and cement industry located a few kilometers from Ilaro.

== History ==
Ilaro was founded in the 18th century by the warrior Aro, who migrated from Oyo, Nigeria and settled in Igbo Aje, a small hill (situated where the centre of the town would later be). From there, he and his warriors could watch for enemies (mostly slave traders from the neighbouring Benin republic, known then as Dahomey. Ilaro took its name from Ilu Aro, meaning the settlement of Aro, which later became Ilaro for ease of pronunciation.

The people of Ilaro fought against people from Dahomey. Legend says that the warrior Orona sunk into the ground, leaving a chain that could be used to pull him back up if he is needed. The Orona Shrine was built where he was said to have rested. It is the location where the coronation of every new traditional ruler of the town is performed, and the Orona Ilaro Festival is celebrated annually in his honor.

During the Nigerian Civil War, Ilaro acted as the headquarters of the Egbado who fought on behalf of the Federal Republic of Nigeria. These include General Olurin, Brigadier General Samuel Adegoriola Oniyide, Major Onifade and Major Ibikunle Armstrong.

There are different Iga (Compounds) and communities associated with indigenes of Ilaro that give every individual a point reference to the exact compound or community where they originated from within the town. Examples are Iga Ekerin, Iga Badagunro, Iga Babaolu, Iga Saatun, Iga Papa-nla, Iga Modeolu, Iga basasin, Iga sawo, Ile-Eeleri, Ile-Olooja-meje, Iga keeke, Ita Alaran, Ilu-Ata, Oju-okeke, oju-Alumuwa, Oju-Obe, Oke-Ibese. Oju-Omofe, Oju oronna, Ona otun, Ona-Osi, Ona-Ola, Isale Idomo, Ile marun, Oju Yewa, and Iga elemo.

Europeans such as Lord Lugard and Mary Slessor visited Ilaro. The longest street in Ilaro is named Leslie Street after J. Leslie. The politician and writer Afolabi Olabimitan is from Ilaro.

== Culture ==
The Ilaro people are the originator of the Bolojo and the Gelede dances. The language of communication at the Gelede dances is songs known as EFE, which is mostly composed to expose and correct the ills done by people in the neighbourhood.

The Adebowale and Atolagbe family of Ona - Otun and the Isale Idiroko compounds of Ilaro are known for the carvings of costumes for the Gelede dance performance, including masks the breast plates. The Bolojo dance are usually held at the Oronna hall or at venues for annual occasions such as the independence anniversary or children's day celebrations.

The Gelede dances are usually held in the market square and usually during the summer time to enable each and every one both, young and old indigenes of Ilaro to participate. Ilaro festivals include The Egungun Masquerade festival, which in most cases usually last for three months with almost daily dances and magic performances at the Egungun play ground in the Ago Ishaga area of Ilaro town.

The Orona Ilaro festival usually includes such events as the Sisi Ilaro beauty pageant, a football match, masquerade displays and festival dances, and a talent hunt.

A promoter of the Yoruba culture in the movie industry, popularly known as Ogogo, was born in Ilaro. Ilaro indigenes have as part of their appellation "Ogogo 'kulodo", "Ogogo T'alujofe", "'Omo Eribigbo Oyo Mako- tracing the history back to the Oyo town."

The Odo Ela, Odo Ogburu, Odo Yewa and Odo Oniru are major rivers in Ilaro. Others are Odo Iran, Odo Ponpola, and Odo Ontede. The rivers serves a twofold purpose of grazing and watering the farmlands of the Yewa/Egbado people and is also dammed to produce potable drinking water to the town's inhabitants. The Ilaro people have farmlands located in Oke Ela, Igbo Igbin, Oteyi, Gbokoto, Abobado, Apakoso, Ona Egbo, Olorunda, Igbeji, Igbogun, Iwoye, Olute, Igbo Adaaro, Ebute Igbo Iro, Oke Ibese, Iweke, Igbo ewe, Ijado, Ilobi, Eredo, and Olorulekan.

Ilaro is a mixed religion town. There are as many numbers of mosques as there are churches. There are also Muslim Missionary training centers of the Ahmadiyat Muslim Mission and the Nawar-ud- deen Missions respectively. Missionaries introduced religion and western education to the people of Yewaland. Churches and schools were founded of which the Christ Missionary Church and school was founded as CMS and the first secondary school in Egbado land known then as Egbado College Ilaro, now Yewa College was also founded.

== Neighbouring towns ==
The following towns are neighbouring towns to Ilaro; they include : Ajilete, Oke-Odan, Owode, Ibese, Oja Odan, Pahayi, Idogo-Ipaja, Papa-Alanto, and Imasayi.

== Politics ==
There is a State High Court and Magistrate Courts located in the town.

== Climate ==
The daily temperature in Ilaro ranges between an average minimum of 23 °C (73 °F) to a maximum of 34.2 °C (93.6 °F).

== Education ==
Ilaro contains schools where pre-primary, primary, secondary and tertiary education can be obtained. Higher institutions of learning include: The Egbado Teachers Training College, Ilaro; and the Federal Polytechnic Ilaro, which began teaching students on November 15, 1979. There are several privately owned pre-primary education and kindergarten school located and spread within the town. Ilaro also has Polytechnic Staff Primary and Secondary schools.

== Infrastructure ==
Means of transportation in Ilaro is primarily by road. However, there is a locomotive railway line linking the town to Lagos and Abeokuta via Ifo junction and also to the terminus of the Lagos Ifo rail trunk line Idogo.

After the Nigerian telephone prefix +234, Ilaro uses the following area codes: 8082, 8083, 8084, 8085 and 0394. Internet access is possible either through private link ups with major internet service providers from Lagos and Abeokuta or through commercial browsing centers located in the town square, on Leslie Road, at the Orita Pahayi and the Federal Polytechnic campus.

Social amenities in Ilaro town include: government-owned and privately owned hospitals, government-owned dispensaries, public libraries, electrical plants, water works and road networks linking the town with other towns and the neighbouring country Benin. In January, 2009, Governor Gbenga Daniel commissioned the Ilaro International stadium.

== See also ==
- Ilaro Court
- Barbados
- Ilaro Stadium
