= Iziaq Adekunle Salako =

Nigerian politician

Minister of State for Health and Social Welfare
- Incumbent
- Assumed office October 23, 2024
- President: Bola Tinubu
- Preceded by: Tunji Alausa

Minister of State for Environment
- In office August 21, 2023 – October 23, 2024

Commissioner for Agriculture, Housing and Health of Ogun State
- In office 2007–2011

Personal details
- Born: Iziaq Adekunle Adeboye Salako; 9 August 1967 (age 59) Ayetoro Yewa North, Ogun State
- Education: University of Lagos
- Occupation: Politician; medical practitioner

Iziaq Adekunle Salako (born 9 August 1967) is a Nigerian politician and medical practitioner who serves as the Minister of State for Health and Social Welfare.

== Early life and education ==
Salako was born to the family of Alhaji Yunus Akande Salako in Ayetoro, Yewa North, Ogun State.

He received his primary education at United Primary School, Ayetoro and proceeded to Abeokuta Grammar School for his secondary education. He holds an MBBS degree from the University of Lagos and a Master of Public Health from the Lagos State University. He is reported to be pursuing a PhD in Public Health, specialising in Health Policy and Management.

== Career ==
He is a certified colposcopist and sonologist. He has worked at Lagos University Teaching Hospital, Onitsha General Hospital, Ebonyi State, St. Raphel Hospital, Lagos, Mucas Hospital, Lagos and the Lagos State Health Service Commission, where he rose to the position of Senior Medical Officer before leaving to pursue other career choices.

=== Political career ===
He served as the Ogun State Commissioner for Agriculture, Housing and Health between 2007 and 2011. In 2020, he was appointed as the Chairman of the Ogun State Hospitals Management Board and was named the best government parastatal chairman in the state in 2021 by Gateway News Magazine. In August 2023, he was nominated by President Bola Ahmed Tinubu to serve as a minister and following a successful screening by the Nigerian Senate, was appointed as the Minister of State for Environment.

On 23 October 2024, following a meeting of the Federal Executive Council (FEC), Salako was reassigned by President Bola Tinubu as the Minister of State for Health and Social Welfare.

== Personal life ==
He is married to Dr Risquat Oluremi Salako, a public health microbiologist and they have three children. He is a Muslim.
