= Murat Iyigun =

American and Turkish scholar

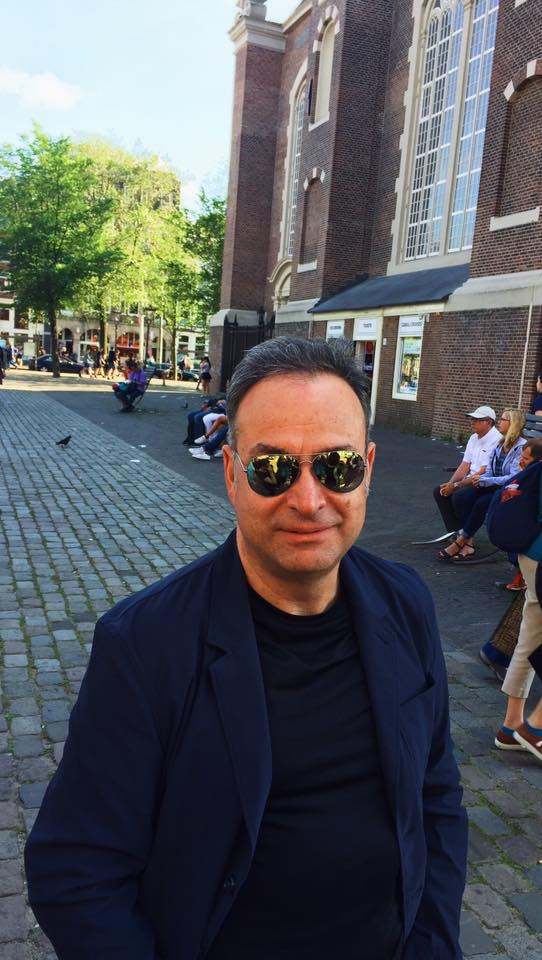
- Education: PhD from Brown University
- Occupation: Economist
- Employer: University of Colorado Boulder
- Website: https://spot.colorado.edu/~iyigun/

Murat Iyigun (born March 21, 1964) is an American and Turkish scholar and author in the field of the economics of family, economic development, political economy, and cliometrics. He is a professor at the University of Colorado.

== Education ==
Murat Iyigun graduated with a B.S. in business administration from Hacettepe University in 1985. He then completed an MBA in Finance and economics from Boston University in 1991. He completed an A.M in Economics in 1992 from Brown University. Finally in 1995 he completed his PhD in economics from Brown. The title of his PhD thesis was Essays on Economic Mobility, Trade, Production and Extralegal Appropriation.

== Career ==
Upon graduating from Brown University in 1995, Murat Iyigun was hired by the Federal Reserve Board, in Washington DC, making him the first Turkish citizen hired by the US Central Bank as a staff economist. In August 2000, he was appointed assistant professor at the University of Colorado in Boulder. He became Associate professor in 2005, Professor in 2010 and appointed Calderwood Chair in 2014.

Besides his academic activities he has held several editorial positions. From 2008 to 2011 he was a board member of the European Journal of Political Economy. From 2010 to 2012 he was Associate Editor for the Journal of Mathematical Population Studies and, between 2014 and 2023, he was Co-editor of Journal of Demographic Economics. He is currently on the editorial boards of Journal of Demographic Economics and Journal of Economics, Management and Religion. Murat Iyigun is also Research Fellow at the Institute of Labor Studies (IZA) in Bonn Germany and the Institute of Behavioral Science (IBS) at the University of Colorado in Boulder. Between 2007 and 2010, he was a visiting scholar and a Research Affiliate at the Center for International Development at Harvard University.

== Publications ==
Professor Iyigun published papers in leading journals such as American Economic Review, Quarterly Journal of Economics, The Review of Economic Studies.

=== Books ===
In 2015, Iyigun published a general interest book entitled War, Peace and Prosperity in the Name of God. In this book Pr. Iyigun studies the impact of monotheistic faith on socio-economic development of societies using econometric techniques. He demonstrates thanks to data that polities based on monotheistic faiths historically had larger territories and survived longer. On this basis, Pr. Iyigun argues that monotheism was a factor of sociopolitical stability domestically but a source of conflicts & territorial conquest internationally.

== Music ==
Murat Iyigun is also a musician, band leader and guitar player. His band, Red Rock Vixens is a show band in Colorado fronted by three female vocalists and covering a mix of classic rock nostalgia, modern party hits, and sing-along favorites.
