= Tope Mark-Odigie =

Nigerian TV personality and entrepreneur

- Born: May 12, 1985 (age 41); Lagos, Nigeria
- Education: Lagos Business School; Prowess University
- Occupations: TV personality, Entrepreneur
- Years active: 2009–present
- Known for: Television host
- Spouse: Mark W. Odigie (m. 2010)
- Children: 3

Tope Mark-Odigie is a Nigerian real estate entrepreneur, television host and chief executive officer of REB360 limited, a Nigerian real estate development company.

She is co-host on TVC's daytime show Your View since 2012 where she talks about nation building and founded REB360 in 2019 to help people attain financial freedom and the founder of Women in Real Estate, Africa.

== Early life and education ==
Tope was born on 12 May 1985 to Mr and Mrs Odubela as the only child in Lagos. She did her Secondary School education in C & S College before proceeding to Yaba College of Technology and obtained a doctorate from the Prowess University.

== Career ==
Tope started her entrepreneurship journey when she was 21 as she founded Ewabela Beauty and in 2021, she founded REB360 Limited, a Real estate company.

Since 2013, she has been the co-host of Your View, an award winning breakfast show on TVC which has millions of viewership globally. She is a fellow of the Institute of Management Consultants.

== Writing ==
In 2024, she authored her debut book titled Mastering the Money Game, which showcased step in harnessing money.

== Personal life ==
Tope married Mark Wilson Odigie, an information technologist in 2010 and together they have three sons and reside in Lagos, Nigeria.
