= Omele =

African drum

An Omele is a type of African drum.

It is a Yoruba word describing a set of three small drums beaten with a distinctive curved stick.
