= Đuraševići =

Đuraševići Ђурашевићи
- Village
- Location within Montenegro
- Coordinates: 42.393765°N 18.689457°E
- Country: Montenegro
- Region: Coastal
- Municipality: Tivat

Population (2011)
  - Total: 471
- Time zone: UTC+1 (CET)
  - Summer (DST): UTC+2 (CEST)

Đuraševići (Montenegrin: Ђурашевићи) is a village in the municipality of Tivat, Montenegro. It is located on the Luštica.

== Demographics ==
According to the 2011 census, it had a population of 471 people.

Ethnicity in 2011
Ethnicity	Number	Percentage
Serbs	255	54.1%
Montenegrins	123	26.1%
Croats	9	1.9%
other/undeclared	93	19.7%
Total	471	100%
