= Suraj Adekunbi =

Nigerian politician (born 1975)

Right Honourable Suraj Adekunbi
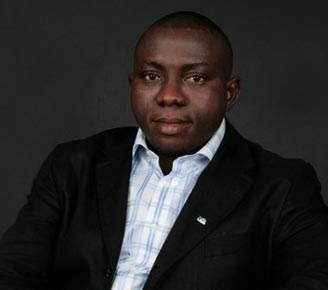

Speaker of the Ogun State House of Assembly
- Incumbent
- Assumed office 2011
- Preceded by: Emmanuel Soyemi Coker
- Constituency: Ogun, Yewa North I

Personal details
- Born: 8 March 1975 (age 51)
- Party: All Progressive Congress (APC)
- Relations: Married
- Education: Comprehensive High School, Aiyetoro; Federal Polytechnic, Ilaro; The Polytechnic, Ibadan; Federal University of Technology Akure; University of Ibadan
- Occupation: Legislature
- Profession: Businessman politician
- Website: www.surajadekunbi.com.ng

Surajudeen Ishola Adekunbi is a Nigerian businessman and member of the Ogun State House of Assembly, where he is its incumbent Speaker.

== Early life ==
Born in Ayetoro, a town in Ogun State in southwestern Nigeria, Adekunbi is one of fifteen children of Rahmon and Elizabeth Adekunbi.

He attended St. Paul African Church Primary School, Ayetoro, before proceeding to Comprehensive High School, Aiyetoro, where he obtained a School Certificate in 1993. He obtained his National Diploma in Mechanical Engineering from Federal Polytechnic, Ilaro in 1996, and then his Higher National Diploma from The Polytechnic, Ibadan. He later earned a Post-Graduate Diploma at Federal University of Technology Akure, as well as a Master's degree in Project Development and Implementation in 2011 from the University of Ibadan.

== Career and politics ==
Adekunbi started his career by working as a project assistant at the Nigerian Petroleum Development Company (NPDC) in Edo State during his National Youth Service Corps in the year 2000. After his Youth Service, he taught at Government Technical College, Idi-Aba, Abeokuta. He later joined the Ogun State Civil Service, working in the Bureau of Transportation from 2004 to 2006, before resigning to join his father's company, Al-Rahman Oil & Gas Limited.

In 2007, he contested the Ogun State House of Assembly seat of Egbado North (now Yewa North) but lost. In 2011 he re-contested under the platform of the Action Congress of Nigeria (ACN) and won. He was also elected as Speaker of the House. and re-elected as Speaker in 2015.
