= Benjamin Akande =

American academic, professor, and business leader

Benjamin Ola Akande
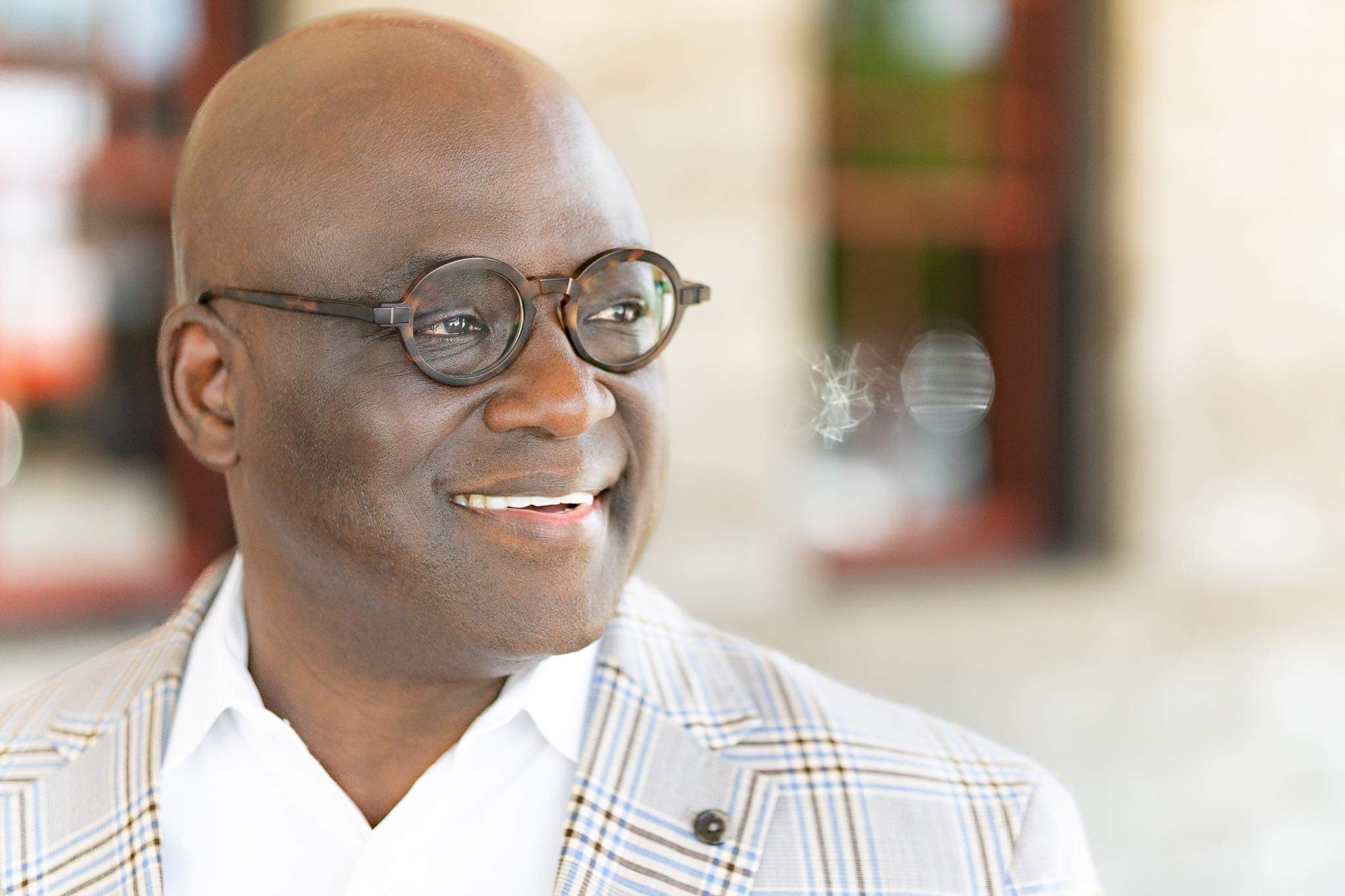
- Akande in 2022

Senior Vice President, Chief Corporate Responsibility Officer (CCRO)
- Incumbent
- Assumed office May 1, 2021

Stifel Financial

Personal details
- Born: 1962 (age 63–64) Nigeria
- Spouse: Bola Taiwo Akande
- Children: 3
- Education: Wayland Baptist University; University of Oklahoma
- Profession: Business Leader; Economist; Academic

Benjamin Ola Akande is a Nigerian-American academic, professor, and business leader. In May 2021 he joined Stifel Financial, a wealth management and investment-banking firm founded in 1890 and based in St. Louis, Missouri with $4.7 billion annual revenue, $39 billion wealth management custodian, $36 billion asset management. He serves as Senior Vice President Chief Corporate Responsibility Officer (CCRO). Dr. Akande served as the ninth President of Champlain College in Burlington, Vermont and led the institution from April 2020 - May 2021. From April 2018 to April 2020 he served as Assistant Vice Chancellor of International Programs-Africa, Director of the Africa Initiative, and associate director of the Global Health Center at Washington University in St. Louis. He is the former 21st president of Westminster College in Fulton, Missouri. Prior to Westminster, he served for 15 years as dean of the Webster University George Herbert Walker School of Business & Technology. Before that, at Wayland Baptist University, he was appointed Chief Academic Officer and chair, Division of Business Administration. Throughout his career, he has consulted with Fortune 500 companies and private enterprise. He is recognized as a media spokesperson on topics such as leadership, economics, and entrepreneurship. He is a national speaker on topics related to leadership and economics.

== Early life and education ==
Akande was born in Nigeria in 1962. His father, a renowned Baptist Minister, Rev. Dr. Samuel Ola. Akande and mother, Comfort Olalonpe, set high standards for him and his four sisters and encouraged them to aim high. He attended Comprehensive High School, Aiyetoro in Ogun State, Nigeria, graduating in 1978. He moved to the United States to further his education in 1979 and earned a bachelor's degree in Business Administration at Wayland Baptist University. He proceeded to the University of Oklahoma where he completed master's degrees in Economics and Public Administration and a Ph.D. in economics. He also completed post-doctoral courses at the John F. Kennedy School of Government at Harvard University and the Saïd School of Business at Oxford University.

== Career ==
In 1995, Akande was appointed Chief Academic Officer and chair, Division of Business Administration, at Wayland Baptist University. He also served as Special Assistant to the President.

In 2000, Akande was appointed as professor of economics and dean of the George Herbert Walker School of Business & Technology at Webster University, and Webster University's Chief of the Office of Corporate Partnerships where he was instrumental in developing and nurturing many corporate and donor partnerships.

From 2015 to 2017, he served as the first black president of Westminster College.

In April 2018 he became Assistant Vice Chancellor of International Programs-Africa, Director of the Africa Initiative, and associate director of the Global Health Center at Washington University in St. Louis. Dr. Akande also chaired Washington University's International Travel Oversight Committee (ITOC).

From April 2020 to May 2021, Dr. Akande served as the 9th President of Champlain College in Burlington, Vermont.

He joined Stifel Financial in St. Louis, Missouri in May 2021, and currently serves as Senior Vice President Chief Corporate Responsibility Officer (CCRO).

Akande has been a consultant to several multinational companies focusing on areas of corporate strategy and responsibility, leadership development and market positioning. He is also a well known commentator on economic and policy issues. He has appeared in NPR Marketplace Public Radio, Anderson Cooper 360 and CBS Evening News. He has been a consultant to the World Bank and the United Nations Development Program (UNDP).

== Selected publications ==
• Akande, B., “Oreo Cookies, the Olympics, and Education,” University Business (October 2012).

• Akande, B., Kourik, J., Maher, P., “Managing the Demands of Accreditation; The Impact of Global Business Schools,” Research in Higher Education Journal (Volume 14, October 2011).

• Akande, B., Feltz, C., “HR’s New Year’s Resolution: Take a Seat at the Strategic Table,” Market Watch (January [1st Quarter/Winter] 6, 2011).

• Maher, P., Kourik, J., Akande, B., “Achieving Quality, Excellence, and Consistency in a Global Academy,” Technology Management for Global Economic Growth, Portland International Center for Management of Engineering and Technology, PICMET Conference. July 18–22, 2010, Proceedings.

• Akande, B., Feltz, C., “Why Strategy Fails?” Chief Learning Officer Magazine (August 2010).

• Masidonski, P., Maher, P., Kourik, J., Akande, B., “Consistent Diversity: Balancing Cultural, Economic, and Assessment Needs in a Global Institution,” AACSB Annual Conference (June 2009).

• Akande, B., “The Web-Savvy Generation,” Financial Times (April 5, 2009).

• Bakewell, T., Akande, B., “Effective Nonprofit Governance: Lessons Learned,” National Association of Corporate Directors (July [3rd Quarter/Summer] 2008).

• Akande, B., Developing Leadership Competencies, “Herausforderungen einer zukunftsorientierten Unternehmenspolitik: Okonomie, Umvelt, Technik and Gessellschaft als Determinanten,” July 2007, 3rd Quarter.

== Recognitions and awards ==
· Distinguished Alumni of the Year, Wayland Baptist University, 2008

· The Clayton Chamber of Commerce Pillar of the Community Award, 2012

== Personal life ==
Benjamin is married to Bola Taiwo-Akande, also a native Nigerian, who he first met as a graduate student at the University of Oklahoma. They have three adult daughters.
