= Federal Polytechnic, Ilaro =

Tertiary educational facility Ogun State, Southwestern Nigeria

Coordinates: 6.895°N 2.983°E

- Motto: Technology towards Development
- Type: Public
- Established: 25 July 1979
- Rector: DR. MUKAIL AREMU AKINDE FCA, ACTI.
- Location: Ilaro, Ogun State, Nigeria
- Website: https://federalpolyilaro.edu.ng

Federal Polytechnic, Ilaro is a polytechnic based in Ogun State, Southwestern Nigeria.

The Institute of Chartered Accountants of Nigeria has recognised the polytechnic as the only one in Nigeria that has maintained high standards of tuition in accountancy.

== Faculties ==
The institution has six faculties, namely:

- School of Management Studies
- School of Environmental Studies
- School of Engineering
- School of Applied Science
- School of information Communication and Technology(SCIT)
- School of Part-Time Studies
