= Yewa North =

Yewa North Egbado North
- LGA
- Interactive map of Yewa North
- Location in Nigeria
- Coordinates: 7°09′N 2°55′E
- Country: Nigeria
- State: Ogun State
- Headquarter: Ayetoro

Government
  - Local Government Chairman and the Head of the Local Government Council: Dr Olusola Samuel Akinbode (APC)

Area
  - Total: 2,087 km^{2} (806 sq mi)

Population (2006 census)
  - Total: 181,826
  - Density: 87.12/km^{2} (225.6/sq mi)
- Time zone: UTC+1 (WAT)
- 3-digit postal code prefix: 111
- ISO 3166 code: NG.OG.EN

Yewa North (formerly Egbado North) is a local government area in the west of Ogun State, Nigeria bordering the Republic of Benin. Its headquarters are in the town of Aiyetoro (or Ayetoro) at 7°14′00″N 3°02′00″E in the north-east of the area.

It has an area of 2,087 km^{2}. Among the twenty LGAs in Ogun state, it has the largest expanse of land with a size of 200,213.5 hectares (494,738 acres) and it has a population of 181,826 at the 2006 census.

The postal code of the area is 111. Yewa North has 11 wards namely: Ayetoro Ward I, Ayetoro Ward II, Idofi Ward, Sunwa Ward, Ijoun Ward, Eggua Ward, Ohunbe Ward, Ibese Ward, Joga-Orile/Ibooro Ward, and Imasayi Ward.
