= Ayetoro =

Town in Ogun State, Nigeria

A short oral history of Ayetoro Iyewa in Iyewa Egbado language by its native speaker

Ayetoro is a town in Nigeria. It lies on the latitude 70 12’N and longitude 30 3’ E in a deciduous- derived savannah zone of Ogun State. The climate is sub-humid tropical with a longtime average annual rainfall of 1,909.30mm. Ayetoro is about 35 km northwest of Abeokuta, a town in south-west part of Nigeria and the capital of Ogun State. The town is the administrative seat/headquarters of Yewa (formally known as Egbado) North Local Government Area. It is connected to Lagos by road and rail and serves as the shipping centre for an area in which cocoa, cassava, cowpea and maize are produced.

It is located in the Derived savanna agro ecological zone. Ayetoro lies between 90 and 120-m above sea-level. The entire area is made up of an undulating surface drained mainly by Rori and Ayinbo rivers. The landform is that of eroded pediment plain with wells incised valleys forming a trellis pattern. The soils are developed over a deeply weathered layer of sedimentary rocks consisting of false bedded sandstones which underlies the area. The sediments are of lower cretaceous rocks or Abeokuta formation (Smyth and Montgomery, 1962) which spread monotonously in northwest and southwest directions. The soil is a gravelly Ultisol (Moormann et al., 1975).The major occupation of the majority of the people living in the town is farming.

The town is known for accommodating one of the oldest public high school – Comprehensive High School which is the pioneer of the current 6-3-4-4 system of education in the country. College of Agricultural Sciences – one of the colleges in Olabisi Onabanjo University – was relocated from Ago-Iwoye to Ayetoro in December 2004 by the Gbenga Daniel led administration.

== Notable people ==
- Prince Gbadebo Omidokun – Egbado North Local Government Chairman (1985-1989), Chairman Ogun State Local Government Service Commission (1990-1992)
- Deacon Adepoju Adeyemi – Secretary to the State Government (1993, 1999–2003)
- Rt. Hon.Suraj Adekunbi – Speaker, Ogun State House of Assembly (2011–2019).
- Dr Iziaq Adekunle Salako - Honorable Minister of State for Environment (Incumbent)
