= List of villages in Enugu State =

This is a list of villages and settlements in Enugu State, Nigeria organised by local government area (LGA) and district/area (with postal codes also given).

== By postal code ==
LGA	District / Area	Postal code	Villages
Aninri	Mpu	402142	Agu-Enyi; Ezza-Mpu (Obunagu); Amachara; Amagu; Obuagu; Ukey
Aninri	Ndeaboh	402141	Abacheku; Amaeze; Amurure; Azunkwo; Nochele; Over Rail; Uhucheke; Uhungo; Uhuogiri; Umuoma; Umurah; Onunweke Ezza.
Aninri	Nenwe	402140	Agbada; Amabor; Amagu; Amokwe; Amorji; Emulemoke; Enugunator; Eziecho; Isi-Enyi; Obeagu; Obiofu; Obulorum; Okpome; Okpulo; Ugwuokpa; Umuagam; Umualugwoyi; Umudibo; Umuewo; Umueze; Umulagu; Umulevo; Umuobele; Umuoji; Umuola; Umuovute
Aninri	Odume	402144	Negba; Ngeneanwa-Odoli; Ezinato; Amankanu; Umuenem; Nanwu; Ngeneawanta; Amamkpume; Amachara-Uka; Amata; Iyinu; Odume-Achara; Amokwe; Ameke; Amagu; Amorji; Mmavu; Obeagu; Ukete
Aninri	Okpanku	402143	Amabiriba; Amaete; Amagu; Amaogudu; Ihuezeoke; Ihuibe; Okpu
Awgu	Agbogugu	402138	Akwu; Amofia; Obinagu; Obodoakpu-Umuevee and Umuonwo; Ohumagu; Shikaghom; Ohumagu; Umuobom; Umuoye
Awgu	Agbudu-Uga	402136	Enugu; Igite; Owellede
Awgu	Amoli	402124	Anike; Ifite; Imama; Odume; Ohumagu
Awgu	Awgu	402120	Adogba; Agbada; Amiyi; Amovia; Awgu; N. A. Quarters; Obunofia; Ogboli; Ogwumabiri; Ogwunesi; Ohaja; Oluocha; Omokwe; Onoli; Otikwu; Ugwenesi; Ululor; Umuhu
Awgu	Awgunta	402121	Agbogwu; Akwaka; Amaabo; Awgunta; Ihite; Isiama; Ogidi; Umuahiagwu; Umuakpu; Umunam
Awgu	Ezere	402126	Achalla; Amaebe; Atta; Ugwungwu; Uhuagu
Awgu	Ihe	402135	Amagu; Awkunano; Enugwu-Agu; Uhueze; Umuanebe; Umuogbe; Umuogodo; Umuonwo; Umuonyia/Umuolu; Umuoriji/Umuebeke; Umushike
Awgu	Isu-Awa	402137	Egedo; Enugu Isu; Ezioka-Isu; Umuamunu
Awgu	Ituku	402139	Amata; Amokolo; Ofeinyi; Ogwunagbo; Okwenachala; Umukulu; Umunevota; Umuonyiba; Umuowo
Awgu	Mmaku	402128	Agboneri; Enugu; Enugu-Afam; Eziama; Ezioha; Ifuteo; Otokwo
Awgu	Mgbidi	402123	Agbonato-Ogba; Amorji; Enuguife; Eziama; Ezioha; Ifite; Isiuga; Isiyi; Ofelite; Ogwugwu; Ogwumgbidi; Ududa; Ugwunato-Ogba; Uwakpu; Adani-Layout; Awa-Layout (Ifite Ndi-Agu)
Awgu	Mgbowo	402122	Alachara; Amata; Ezioha; Ime-Ama; Inyi
Awgu	Nkwe	402126	Ezinifite; Isiokwe; Umuilo; Ifite-Umuekwe; Umueze; Umuzo, Umunkwoke; Obinagu; Umuanum; Umungo-Amagu; Isiawa
Awgu	Nenwenta	402125	Amaebe; Amaeke; Ifite; Obiagu; Ofenugu; Ogbuanywu; Ugwuafor
Awgu	Obeagu	402130	Abaugwu; Ama; Amagu; Ebenebe; Enugunato; Ndahe; Obuo; Ogwuagbom; Uhueze; Umuabuzoukwu; Umude 25; Umuna; Umuoji/Amabor
Awgu	Ogbaku	402132	Mbio; Odume; Okpebe; Umuatubo; Umuawusi; Umuizim; Umuobene
Awgu	Ogugu	402131	Amanaboh; Eziola; Ibite
Awgu	Oweli	402134	Amabo; Awono; Enugu; Umuhu
Awgu	Ugbo	402133	Ngene Ugbo; Ogba Ogbase; Oyibo Umu-Onaga; Ugbookpara; Uhu Ome
Awgu	Ugwu-Eme	402129	Amagu; Ihite; Obulo; Okpesi; Ugwuanya; Umuagwu; Umuokpara
Enugu East	Nike	400103	Agbogazi; Ako; Akpoga; Alulu; Amoji; Amokpo; Azama; Edem; Effokwe; Emene; Ibeagwa; Ije-Amaowelle; Nbulunjodo; Nchetanche; Neke Odenigbo; Nekeuno; Ngwuomu; Nkwubo; Nokpa; Obinagu; Onuogba; Onyohu
Enugu East	Ogwogo	400104	Adaeze; Amankpa; Farm Settlements; Obinagu; Ogbodogo; Okpuhu; Ugwunkwo; Umunagbo; Umunnameze; Umunonu; Utazi
Enugu North	Ogui	400102	Amaigbo; Ihenwuzi; Onueto; Umunevo
Enugu South	Akuke	400107	Amagu; Atagwu; Okwu/Obeahu; Umuanigu Ugwu; Umuatogbo-Owa
Enugu South	Amechi	400106	Amagu; Awkunanaw; Isiagu; Iside; Ndiaga; Ndiagbana; Ndiugbo; Sata; Ugwuafa; Ugwuagba; Umuedeachi; Umunugwu; Umuogo
Enugu South	Obeagu	400108	Amagu; Amauzam; Ngine; Nkpofia; Obinagu; Obodou Vulu; Uzamagu; Uzamdun
Enugu South	Ugwuaji	400105	Amuzam; Isiagu; Ndiaga; Ochufu; Onuba; Ugboba-Ani; Umunnaji Ngene; Umunnaugwu
Ezeagu	Agba-Umana	401127	Agba; Isiugwu; Ndiagu
Ezeagu	Aguobu-Owa	401125	Ezedume; Ezema; Imezi; Ogwofia; Okunito; Umuaji; Umudim
Ezeagu	Aguobu-Umuaji	401130	Ezema; Ogwofia; Ozom; Umiaji; Umudim
Ezeagu	Aguobu-Umumba	401129	Idume; Obodo Ngbogbo; Umu-Matu; Umuodama; Umuojor
Ezeagu	Akama Oghe	401141	Enuguna Agbani; Imama; Isiokwe
Ezeagu	Amakwo Oghe	401143	Enugu-Agu; Imezi; Ndiagu
Ezeagu	Amansi-Odo	401144	Amansiode Ndiagu; Amansiodo Imeze; Ihuonyia; Ndibenifi; Ndibinagu Amansiodo; Ndiuno; Ugwuanya; Umugwu Amansiodo
Ezeagu	Awha Imezi	401134	Akpagbo; Ikenga; Ogwuofia
Ezeagu	Awha Ndiagu	401133	Akpagbo; Ikenga; Ogwofia
Ezeagu	Iwollo Oghe	401139	Amagu; Enugwu; Ezeonyia; Ndibunagu; Obunagu; Owoloti
Ezeagu	Neke	401142	Ajana Egugwu; Enugwu; Imama; Umumechi
Ezeagu	Obelagu-Umana	401128	Agulu; Aguoba-Obelagu; Evazu; Okpuata; Okpudo; Omughu; Ozono; Ugwuakulu; Umuagbo; Umuakan; Umuene; Umueze Amaji; Umusulu
Ezeagu	Obunofia-Ndiagu	401136	Okposi; Umueze; Umuezeagu; Umuonaga; Unuawo
Ezeagu	Obunofia-Ndiuno	401135	Ihuezi; Okposi; Umuawo; Umueze; Umuezeagu; Umuonaga
Ezeagu	Okpo-Gho	401132	Mgbuta; Ukwuagba; Volovolo
Ezeagu	Olo	401138	Achara-Owa; Amandim; Ezema; Ibite; Ogulogu
Ezeagu	Owa	401126	Ezi-Owa; Ozom
Ezeagu	Oyofo	401140	Amaetiti; Imama; Ndiabo; Obiagu; Umuanaobu; Umuani; Umuohaoku
Ezeagu	Umumba-Ndiagu	401137	Idume; Ogodo-Ngbogbo; Umu-Ulatu; Umuani; Umuavaka; Umuodama; Umuojor
Igbo-Etiti	Aku	411108	Amabokwu; Amogwu; Ejuonu; Mgboko; Nua; Obie; Offienyi; Ohemuje; Orda; Oshigo; Ugwuegede; Ugwunani; Umueme; Umuezike; Use
Igbo-Etiti	Diogbe	411104	Agbo; Ndiugwu; Umunashi
Igbo-Etiti	Ekwegbe	411110	Aguakwegbo; Amandu; Amanonucha; Amaotu; Ohumofia; Ozeachara; Ukopi
Igbo-Etiti	Ikolo	411102	Ameti; Ikoloani; Uhamurodo; Uhanuchu
Igbo-Etiti	Ochima	411101	Ama Egede; Ezinaibite; Ogbede
Igbo-Etiti	Ohebe / Ohodo	411103	Akaibite; Akutala; Chinwa; Ejuona; Ohodo
Igbo-Etiti	Onyohor	411106	Amabinagu; Amobo; Amoji; Umuozigbo; Umuriko
Igbo-Etiti	Ozalla	411109	Akaib ite; Ijo; Ikolo; Isiamelu; Nnaru; Ujoma
Igbo-Etiti	Udueme	411107	Amaelu; Nkitiba; Uwani
Igbo-Etiti	Ukehe	411105	Akpuato; Amagwu; Amanefi; Idoha; Nkpologwu; Ukwaja; Umudulo; Umufiagu; Umurusi; Uwani Abaka
Igbo-Etiti	Umunko	411108	Amagodo; Amaokpuhu; Ohene; Amadime; Amahor; Amadulu
Igbo-Eze North	Ezzodo	413107	Aba-Agu; Abaraoji; Aji; Atikor; Ekenya; Ero-Aguafor; Ezenweze; Ezike; Oduma; Oduma Agu; Ogboghinya; Okele-Owo; Okpala-Obaka; Onazi; Onazi-Uno; Onyiro; Oshowu; Oyijerewu; Uda-Enugwu-Ezike; Ugbuagbo-Onyeke; Umuagada; Umu ida; Umuogbo-Agu; Umuogbo-Inyi; Umuogbo-Uno; Uroahi Enugwu
Igbo-Eze North	Ibagwa Aka	413108	Amaebo; Amankpu-Ibagwa; Amebi Ndaba; Echezma; Ibagwa; Idi Ibagwa; Ishi-Agu; Ndaoma Ngwunyi; Ndioka; Nsu Ibagwa; Owerri Ibagwa; Umuagru; Umuelo
Igbo-Eze North	Umu-Itodo	413105	Amachall Enugu; Amufie Enugu-Ezike; Igbelle Enugu; Ikpiga Enugu; Imufu Enugu; Olido Enugu; Uda; Uroshi
Igbo-Eze North	Umuozzi	413101	Amaja-Enugwu-Ezike; Ekposhi-Enugu-Ezike; Ezillo-Enugwu-Ezike; Ibagwa-Aka Enugwu-Ezike; Igogoro-Enugwu-Ezike; Ikpamodo-Enugwu-Ezike; Mkpamute; Ofodo-Enegwu-Ezike; Ogrutee-Enugwu-Ezike; Okpo-Enugwu-Ezike; Onicha Enugwu-Ezike; Umuogbo-Ekposhi; Umuopu-Enugu-Ezike
Igbo-Eze South	Alor-Agu	413106	Ajuona; Ogbueke; Ovoko; Owerre-Eze; Ubiam-Aye; Umuavulu; Umuegogidaka; Umueko; Umuidu; Umunakata; Umuoroko
Igbo-Eze South	Iheaka	413109	Akyi-Iheaka; Eke Utara-Iheaka; Like Iheaka; Ugo-Iheaka
Igbo-Eze South	Iheakpu-Awka	413111	Achebulo-Iheakpu; Amaenyije Iheakpu; Edem Iheakpu; Ngwuola-Iheakpu; Okolo-Iheakpu; Ororu-Iheakpu; Umuata-Iheakpu; Umujoju-Iheakpu; Umunjaba-Iheakpu; Umuokwu-Iheakpu; Umuori-Iheakpu
Igbo-Eze South	Itchi	413102	Amakpuru; Amobo; Ejikanaejima; Itchi-Agu; Itchi-Oha; Okan; Umuakaenyi; Umuogbu; Unadu
Igbo-Eze South	Nkalagu / Obukpa	413103	Agbonkuru; Edembekwu; Emoha; Okpaligbo; Ukwu-Okpe
Igbo-Eze South	Ovoko	413110	Ama Aho Ovoko; Ama-Agu-Ovoko; Ama-Ajim-Ovoko; Amachalla-Ovoko; Amahab -Ovoko; Amaja-Ovoko; Amani-Ovoko; Amaoboada-Ovoko; Amofia-Ovoko; Aza-Ali; Ibeku-Ovoko; Ogbodo-Ukwu; Ogwudo-Ovoko; Ohagu-Ovoko; Udunwagu-Ovoko; Ukwuakpu-Ovoko; Umu-Ezeavlu-Ovoko; Umu-Jumuta-Ovoko; Umu-Ogida-Ovoko; Umu-Oroko-Ovoko; Umu-Shire-Ovoko; Umualiogwu-Ovoko; Umuashi-Ovoko; Umuezeoka-Ovoko; Umugbabo-Ovoko; Umujioha-Ovoko; Umukada-Ovoko; Umuodu-Ovoko; Umuogburu-Ovoko; Umuogbuuru-Ovoko; Umuogene-Ovoko; umuoshigi-Ovoko; Uuuogegwu-Ovoko
Igbo-Eze South	Uhuna Owerre	413104	Achara; Amaekwuru; Amaozu; Amikwo-Ulo; Ete; Ete Nawa; Okajara; Umu-Orogbo; Umuagba-Okazi; Umuagbado; Umuede-Odoga; Umugbado-Odicha; Umuodobo; Umuona
Isi-Uzo	Eha Amufu	412102	Abor; Agu Amede; Amede; Ape-Mgbuji; Ihanyi; Isu; Mgbuji; Orokoro; Umuhu; Umujoovu
Isi-Uzo	Ikem	412101	Abbia; Amu-Aram; Amudam; Iken-Nkwo; Odomogwo; Ogor; Umu-Aja
Isi-Uzo	Mbu Amon	412104	Mbu-Agu-Udene; Mbu-Ajona; Mbu-Akpoti; Mbu-Akpuoga; Mbu-Amon; Oka-Egbera; Ugwuoke-None
Isi-Uzo	Neke	412105	Akpani; Isienu; Neke; Obegu-Aba; Umuegwu; Umugwu
Isi-Uzo	Umuero	412103	Aliyi; Umu-Idiji; Umuenyi-Ogodo; Umueze-Boko; Umueze-Ogbu
Nkanu East	Amagunze	402111	Aniyi; Enuvu-Egu; Oicha-Agu; Okeani; Omuno; Osu; Ukkwukani; Umu Okpara; Umunevo
Nkanu East	Amechi Idodo	402117	Eziama; Uzama
Nkanu East	Nara	402113	Amagu; Amaofia; Isiogbo; Umuaja; Umueragu; Umueze; Umuiba; Umuokpalagene
Nkanu East	Nkerefi	402115	Akanfu; Amankanu; Emuoku; Ezi Nkerefi; Ezinachu; Ezza Nkerefi; Ihuagbu; Ihuagu; Ihuawako; Ihuokpara; Imeoha; Iruka; Isinga; Mbanaocha; Mburubu; Obodo Agbulu; Obodoukwu; Obunu; Obuoffia; Onueke; Umueze-Awk; Umuezeoche; Umuikan; Umunama; Umuogbui; Umuogodi
Nkanu East	Nomeh	402114	Amaigbo; Amukabi; Imama; Uhuafor; Uhuoji; Umuchukwu
Nkanu East	Ogbahu	402119	Ikeokparogba; Ngwubo; Omuno
Nkanu East	Oruku	402116	Amaeke; Eziobodo; Isiewu; Ndiaguagu; Obinagu; Ohuani
Nkanu East	Owo	402118	Asisi; Emene; Isiagu; Ndiagu; Ogala; Ohuani
Nkanu East	Ugbawka	402112	Amafor Ugbawka; Amauzam; Isigwe; Onu Orie
Nkanu West	Agbaani	402101	Amafor; Amainyi; Amiagwo; Mbogodo; Obeagu; Ogbeke; Ukuruta; Uwani
Nkanu West	Akagbe-Amodu	402109	Echara; Ndiagu; Umuorume
Nkanu West	Akagbe-Ugwu	402110	Amagunnajiukwu; Atakwu; Obeagini; Umuetugbuoma; Umuokwuo; Umuuba
Nkanu West	Amuri	402106	Amankanu; Enugu; Eziokwe; Obeagu; Umuigbo
Nkanu West	Obe	402107	Enugu Obe; Obodo ukpa; Umuenenta; Umuike Owo; Umungutowo; Umunowo
Nkanu West	Obinagu / Uwani /Akpu ugo	402104	Amafor; Amanko; Ameke;Amaowre; Eziaba; Iga; Ama-Akpu; Eziobodo; Ogirishi; Orji
Nkanu West	Obuno	402102	Amafor; Amankwo; Ekeaku; Ndiagu-Nnajiori; Njwuaja; Onuobo; Onuorie; Ubogu
Nkanu West	Ogonogeji Ndiagu	402105	Amaede; Ameke Ani; Amuhu; Eziobodo; Ihunekeman; Obinagu
Nkanu West	Ogonogeji Ndiuna	402103	Ogonogoeji-Ndiuno
Nkanu West	Ozalla	402108	Amachi; Amaigbo; Enugu-Agu; Ezi; Obeagwu; Umuokolouba
Nsukka	Alor-Uno	410105	Ajuona; Amikpo; Ugbene; Uwani
Nsukka	Anuka	410114	Ajuona; Aka-Utara; Amala; Ukwuokpeye; Umushere
Nsukka	Edem	410104	Akpa-Edem; Edem-Ani; Ozzi-Edem
Nsukka	Ede-Oballa	410109	Ede-nta; Ede-Ukwu
Nsukka	Eha-Alu-Mona	410106	Agbamere; Ama Okpara; Amaechi Elu; Amundi; Eha; Isienu; Ogbodo Elu; Ogbodu Okanya; Ukwuaji; Umude; Uwani
Nsukka	Eha-Ndiagu	410107	Azuabor; Breme; Etiti-Agu; Ezembunagu; Umabo
Nsukka	Ibagwa - Agu	410116	Acharichankpume; Agudele; Ogwuoroko; Ugwu-ohugu; Uzoanyinya
Nsukka	Ibagwa-Ani	410112	Uwani; Ejuona; Omaka
Nsukka	Lejja	410110	Akaibite; Ejuona; Umani
Nsukka	Nsukka (Rural)	410101	Ihe/Owerre; Nkpunano; Nru
Nsukka	Obimo	410102	Agbo; Ajuona; Akautara; Akpotoro; Eluagu; Ikwoka
Nsukka	Obukpa	410113	Ajuona; Obige; Odim; Ogbeagu; Owerre; Ugokpe
Nsukka	Okpaligbo	410103	Edemani; Ibeagwa-Aka; Iheaka; Ovoko
Nsukka	Okpuje	410111	Ajuona; Aka-Utara; Akaibite
Nsukka	Okutu	410115	Achara; Agbo-Enugu; Agbo-Ogazi; Amaogbo; Ohuno; Onene; Ugwaka; Uwani
Nsukka	Opi	410108	Ibeku; Idi; Ihiagu; Ogbozala; Opi-Agu
Oji River	Achi	401147	Achiagu; Adu; Agbadalna; Ahani; Akwu; Amaetit; Amankpunator; Egwu Achi; Elhuhe; Enugu Achi; Ihe; Isikwe; Nkpokoro; Umumba
Oji River	Akpugeze	401150	Abo; Amagu; Egbe-Agu; Ofechem; Ofemili; Umudim; Umuokpara
Oji River	Awlaw	401149	Etiti; Isiama; Nkwuni; Ubahu
Oji River	Inyi	401148	Agbalidi; Akwu; Alaocha Nkwerre; Alum; Amankwo; Enugu-Inyi; Nkwerri-Inyi; Obune; Umuagu; Umuome
Oji River	Oji River	401145	Agbalenyi; Agu-Ugwu; Central; Dodo; Ojia-Oyi; Ojinato; Ugwunzu
Oji River	Ugwuoba	401146	Agolo; Aguabosi; Agungwu; Agunwu-Ogboo; Efulu; Egbeagu; Ezi-Achi; Nkpagu; Obiagu; Ogbudu; Okpudu; Okwe; Uide; Umalu; Umualu; Umuomu; Updata
Udenu	Amalla	412114	Ifuroka; Umu-Egari; Umunachi
Udenu	Ezimo	412108	Ama-Ogbele; Amaebo; Amala-Ogbo; Amankpu-Ibegwa; Amaogu; Amebi Ndaba; Amube Enugu; Echezema; Enugu Ezike; Ezike; Ibagwa; Idi Ibagwa; Inyi Enugu; Ishi-Agu; Ishi-Ugwu Ezike; Iyionu; Ndaoma Ngwunyi; Ndioka; Nsu Ibagwa; Ogbodu Enugu; Ogbufie; Owerre Eze; Owerri Ibagwa; Ozzala; Ugbaike Enugu; Umuagru; Umuchi; Umuelo; Umuopuagu
Udenu	Imilike	412111	Abada; Amagu; Amaogodo; Ame-Elugwu; Ameti; Amezike; Okogwuma; Umueze; Umuinyere
Udenu	Obollo-Afor	412113	Amulanyi; Inekpu; Ohulo; Ugbabe
Udenu	Obollo-Eke	412107	Amutenyi; Ibenda; Iheakpu; Nkpunato; Odobido; Ogwu; Ohulor; Okpaligbo; Ugbabe-Uwani; Umu-Ezejor
Udenu	Obollo-Etiti	412109	Adda; Ohulor-Etiti; Umuosuogwu; Umuitodo; Umuoleyi; Umuonyeke; Umuosigide
Udenu	Ogbodu-Aba	412106	Akpoo; Ika-Agwu; Onicha-Ogbodo; Ukpu-Agba; Unona-Ogbodo
Udenu	Orba	412110	Agu Orba; Ajuona; Amalla; Amaoba; Oham; Ohebe-Orba; Owerri Amagu; Owerri-Ezeorba; Owerri-Okpu; Umu-Ugwu; Umunkpume
Udenu	Udunedem	412112	Igugu; Umu-Ndu
Udi	Abia	401104	Amaeti; Awagu; Enugu-Abia; Iseke; Umuma
Udi	Abor	401114	Amaezike; Amukwu; Dinigweze; Dinobe; Ozalla; Ubiekpo; Ugwunani; Umuavulu
Udi	Affa	401119	Amaozalla; Amofia; Amokwu; Ikono; Inoyi; Obinagu Afia; Ogor; Umukoloma
Udi	Agbudu	401102	Amabo; Amukpa; Ibite; Odume; Uzoagbo
Udi	Akpakwume	401123	Ama-Ave; Amagbo; Amaofue; Amaovellu; Amauzalla; Ogbugo; Umudiekwon; Umuogbo; Umuugwu
Udi	Amokwe	401103	Enugu Agu; Ibuzor; Idedu; Obeagu; Orji; Umudim; Umueze; Uwani
Udi	Ebe	401113	Adukwu; Amagu; Eziama; Omadi; Omadi-Uwenu; Umavulu; Umuezike
Udi	Egede	401116	Amaozalla; Anekeneze; Okwum; Umuanum; Umudi; Umuezenevo; Umuokpalla; Umuovu
Udi	Eke	401112	Amankwo Eke; Enugu-Eke; Ogui Agu Eke; Ogui Eki; Oma Eke
Udi	Nachi	401108	Amagu; Ameke; Okpobueze; Umubo
Udi	Ngwo	401111	Amabo; Amachala; Amankwo; Ameke; Enugu; Etiti; Ngwo Uno; Okwojo; Uboji; Ukaka; Umuase
Udi	Nsude	401110	Agagu; Amuyi; Amosuwo; Diakuma; Okpurio; Ugwu-Uto; Ugwuakulu; Umuaka; Umualor; Umuezeani
Udi	Nze	401124	Agballa; Aguru; Amutu; Ihe; Ihezegwuoke; Ihonze; Ilonze; Isiubo; Ntugevo; Okinigbo; Ujatta
Udi	Obinagu	401105	Agbani; Amofia; Okpunyo; Okunator; Owa; Umuaboshi; Umuaneke Agwo; Umuaneke Ugwu; Umudike; Umuota
Udi	Obioma	401109	Abba; Amachala; Amanwugwo; Ameke; Oluku
Udi	Oghu	401122	Ezama; Oghu
Udi	Okpatu	401118	Ama Egbu; Ama-Agu; Amachalla; Amani-Okpatu; Amaonugbu; Amoka; Amukwu; Eziama; Obiagu; Umeneme; Umuchime; Umuene
Udi	Owhum	401117	Ama Azalla; Amabor na Amani; Isiogwu
Udi	Udi	401101	Amagu; Awkunanaw; Eke Na Ene; Umuezechime; Umuoka
Udi	Ukana	401115	Adani; Amabota; Amaezu; Amakpu; Aseje; Enugu-Eseachi; Ibite; Ikenga; Ngodo; Okofia
Udi	Umuabi	401106	Amaji; Enugu Amaji; Imama; Inewe; Ogbuabala; Omashi; Ufiala; Umunwe; Umuokefi/Umuifi
Udi	Umuaga	401107	Ububa/Imeama; Umuaneke; Umunnacha; Umuokpala; Unuonaga
Udi	Umulumgbe	401121	Akpani; Akpato; Ama-Uwenu; Amabor; Amachara; Amaowerri; Edem; Eziama; Lett; Okomaji; Uwenu
Udi	Umuoka	401120	Amadia; Amaebu; Amakpu; Amangwu; Ekpe; Ikenga; Umualia; Umuonye
Uzo-Uwani	Abbi	411125	Amanyi; Apapam; Enugu; Owereze; Uba; Umuogbogwu; Uruku; Uwenuokpe
Uzo-Uwani	Adaba	411113	Ama-Etiti; Amaogbo; Amaokwe; Amoku; Ibagwa; Obunagu; Ozulume; Umedolu; Umueze-Akwu; Umuezeke; Umuotugbo
Uzo-Uwani	Adani	411117	Ajuona; Akutala; Eziama; Iyiekeniga; Ofesi-Okpu; Onueke; Uwenuakpa
Uzo-Uwani	Akpugo	411120	Amaogbo; Nkokpe; Ohe; Umugwuyama; Umuinye; Umunjom
Uzo-Uwani	Asaba	411116	Amoye; Obianu
Uzo-Uwani	Igga	411115	Akwulu; Asado; Ojulo
Uzo-Uwani	Nimbo	411124	Akpamaya; Amogbo; Ekwulu; Isiyiareji; Jide Break; Ngwoko; Owerre; Umuoma; Opanda; Ugwuijoro; Ukpabi; Unasi
Uzo-Uwani	Nkpologu	411122	Agumu; Ama-ezike; Ama-ikwere; Ama-ngbana; Arakanyi; Awuzi; Nkpunator; Ugwugo; Ugwuonyishi; Umu Enem; Umuobira; Uwani Ogba
Uzo-Uwani	Nkume	411112	Amudala; Eji-Nkume; Ujolodu; Umunu
Uzo-Uwani	Nrobo	411126	Ajayigbo; Ofumu; Okpara; Umuamuna; Umudesue; Umuoyo
Uzo-Uwani	Ogurugu	411119	Atida; Nkanu; Ofuegbe; Okpotopu; Onaja; Ukpele
Uzo-Uwani	Ojor	411118	Umu-Ekeyi; Umu-Ogbochi; Umuame; Umuasaba; Umuitodo
Uzo-Uwani	Ugbene	411123	Afokuje; Ama-Ikwu; Ama-Ogidi; Amaiseke; Asnienyi; Enugu-Ada; Isi-Uvuru; Isiama; Itakwuna; Ngwokwa; Nkpunator; Orba; Owenu-Ori; Ujaju; Umu-Asa; Umuayo; Umueze; Umukpakar; Uwani; Uwani-Eriyi; Uwenu-Onyishi
Uzo-Uwani	Ukpata	411114	Achalla Oda; Amufi; Ugwudimu; Umudi-Ugwu; Umudingwuke; Umueze Amunna; Umueze-Amokwulu; Umuezengwu; Umumbosi; Umuogu; Umuonyia
Uzo-Uwani	Umulokpa	411111	Akiyi; Akwunitor; Amagu; Amofu; Amulu; Enugu-Uwani; Eziora; Imama; Mgbogbo; Nkwelle; Odida; Ukpatu; Umuezeugwu; Umumasi; Umuogene; Uwani
Uzo-Uwani	Uvuru	411121	Amono-Utokpu; Inama; Ogwu-Umudia; Okasibi; Ugbene; Umuntu; Utoamaka; Uvuru-Ani

== By electoral ward ==
Below is a list of polling units, including villages and schools, organised by electoral ward.

LGA	Ward	Polling Unit Name
Aninri	Odume I	Comm. Sch. Oduma Achara; Amaeze Enugu Agu Village Square; Olovolo Village Square; Mmafu Comm. School; Obodo Ukwu Village Square; Community School Ukete; Amankanu Village Square; Comm. Primary School Amorji Ani; Amorji Enu Village Square; Comm. Sch. Odume- Achara
Aninri	Odume II	Comm. School Obeagu Odume; Liberty School, Obeagu Odume; Uhuanwunta Village Square; Obodo Okpoko Village Square; Obodo Ogbunta Village Square; Obodo Akpam Square, Uhuagu; Amokwe Comm. Scho. Uhuegboke; Comm. School Uhuagu Amokwe; Comm. Sch. Uhuagu; Eke Ameke Square; Central School Oduma I; Nwafor Udene Vill. Sqr; Central Sch. Odume II
Aninri	Odume III	Amacharauka Village Square; Amohite Village Square; Nanwu Village Square; Comm. School Ezinesi Odume I; Comm. School Ezinesi Odume II; Obodo Imangene Anwunta Village Square; Comm. Sch. Ezinesi Odume III; Obodo Imangene Anwunta Vill. Square
Aninri	Odume IV	Community School Odume I; Afor Market Square I; Comm. School Ezinato; Nkwo Mkt. Square; Obuagu Village Square Ezinato I; Obuagu Village Square Ezinato II; U. P. E. School Ohofia; Comm. Sch. Odume II; Afor Market Square II
Aninri	Nnenwe I	Umulagu Comm. School I; Umudibo Comm. School I; Amabo Comm. School; Obulorum Primary School; Obiofu Comm. School; Okpulo Village Square; Umulagu Comm. Sch. II; Umudibo Comm. School II
Aninri	Nnenwe II	Emulemoke Comm. School I; Okpome Comm. School I; Amagu Primary School I; Amagu Primary School II; Emulemoke Comm. School II; Okpome Comm. School II
Aninri	Nnenwe III	Eziecho Comm. School; Enugunato Primary School; Enugunato Village Hall; Obeagu Primary School; Obeagu Town Hall; Umulugwayi Primary School; Central School Uhueze I; Central School Uhueze II; Umueze Town Hall; Umulevo Town Hall I; Umulevo Town Hall II; Amagu/Umulevo Town Hall; Umuagam Village Hall; Central School Emudo Nenwe; Comm. School Emudo Nenwe; Umuakum/Umuovutu Town Hall; Umuekuma Town Hall; Ekpulato Town Hall; Ugwuogidi Town Hall; Umuosi Comm. Schl.; Izizike Town Hall
Aninri	Ndeabo	Obodo Umuoma Village Square I; Comm. School Uhuogiri I; Comm. School Umurah I; Central Sch. Ndeaboh; Uhugo Village Square; Comm. School Azunkwo; Comm. School Onunweke I; Comm. School Nochele; Comm. School Abacheku; Obodo Umuoma Village Square II; Central Schl. Ndeaboh II; Comm. Schl. Umurah II; Comm. Schl. Uhuogiri II; Comm. Schl. Onunweke II.
Aninri	Okpanku	Ihuibe Primary School Okpanku I; Ihuibe Primary School Okpanku II; Central School Amabiriba; Amaeze Primary School I; Amogudu Primary School I; Okpu Primary School I; Uhuezeoke Comm. Pri. Sch; Amaeze Pri. Schl. II; Central Schl. Amabiriba II; Amogudu Primary School II; Okpu Primary School II; Agbada Uhuezeoke
Aninri	Mpu	Comm. Pri. School Mpu I; Comm. Sec. School Mpu I; Amachalla Primary School; Aguenyi Central School; U. P. E. School Ezza Mpu; Agungwu Primary School; Ukey/Ubeagu Primary School; Agugwu Amagu; Imuno Village Square; Central Schl. Mpu; Ubeagu Village Square; Ezza Mpu Village Square; Comm. Pri. School Mpu II; Town Sch. Nzeiem Amachala; Comm. Sec. School Mpu II
Awgu	Awgu I	Town School Awgu I; Town School Awgu II; Central School Awgu I; Central School Awgu II; Comm. School Adogba; Comm. School Ululor Ohaja; Union Primary School Ohaja; Enugu Road Primary School; Obodo Ibite Square; Comm. School Ogboli Ndiuno; Ogboli Ndiagu Primary School; Obodo Amata Amokwe Square; Obodo Ukwu Evam Village Square; Obugo Village Square; Cooperative Complex Awgu; Ndiagu Oluavo Village Square
Awgu	Awgu II	Joint Oschool Amofia; Comm. School Onoli I; Comm. School Onoli II; Comm. School Awgu; Obodo Ameta Obuoffia Square; Ogwumabiri Square Awgu I; Oye Umuhu Market Square I; Oye Umuhu Market Square II; Joint School Awgu; Amajiriji Village Square; Uhuanya Public Square; Ogwumabiri Square Awgu II; Eziumuhu Public Square
Awgu	Mgbowo	Obodo Ikoro Square; Comm. School Ezioha I; Comm. School Ezioha II; Central. School Imama I; Central. School Extension; Comm. School Amata I; Comm. School Amata II; Town. School Amata I; Town. School Amata II; Comm. School Eziobodo I; Comm. School Eziobodo II; Ngeleator Primary School; Comm. Primary School, Inyi; Obushi Inyi Town Hall; Cooperative Hall Ogbeta; Boys' Secondary School Mgbowo; Cent. Sch. Imama II; Cooperative Hall Ogbeta II
Awgu	Agbogugu	Obinagu Village Hall; Obodo Umuokwolo; Town School Amofia; Oye Market Amofia I; Onu Oha Ogbo Square; Shikaghom Primary School I; Obodo Ndiagbo Square I; Obodo Ndiagbo Square II; Obodo Umuanebe Square; Obodo Akpu Square; Obodo Ugwuaji Square; Obodo Agu Square; Obodo Eze Square; Obodo Umujioke Square; Umuonwo Hall; Ndiugwu Village Hall; Ndiagbo Village Hall; Ohumagu Primary School; Shikaghom Primary Sch. II; Umuona Obinagu Village Square; Oye Market Square Amofia II
Awgu	Ihe	Comm. School Ihe I; Comm. School Ihe II; Umuonwo/Umuonyia Hall I; Umuonwo/Umuonyia Hall II; Central School Ihe I; Central School Ihe II; Primary School Ihe I; Primary School Ihe II; Comm. School Umuogba; Ihueze Hall; Umusibe Hall I; Umusibe Hall II; Umuaniebe Village Hall; Awkunanaw Village Hall
Awgu	Mgbidi/Mmaku	Comm. Development Training Centre (Cdtc); Ifite Town Hall I; Ifite Town Hall II; Ifite Town Hall III; Comm. Primary School Mgbidi I; Comm. Primary School Mgbidi II; Central School Mgbidi I; Central School Mgbidi II; Comm. Sec. School Mgbidi I; Enugu Affam Hall; Wisdom Comm. Inst. Mmaku I; Wisdom Comm. Inst. Mmaku II; Village Square Eba Ibite; Central Square Ezioha; Orji Obodo Square I; Opposhi Market Square I; Opposhi Market Square II; Primary School Ama-Udala; Comm. School Enugu Mmaku; Obodo Orji Square Ibite II; Okwulohia Village Square Ifite; Akpuobia Village Square; Nvuja Village Square; Comm. Sec. Sch. Mgbidi II; Agboneli Village Square Mmaku; Obodoube Village Square Mmaku; Uhuogbeugwu Village Square Mmaku; Uhuoyeagbo Village Square Mmaku
Awgu	Anikenano/Ugwueme	Health Centre Ezere I; Health Centre Ezere II; Comm. School Ezere; Central. School Nkwe I; Nkwe Square; Nkwe Town Hall; Central School Awgunta; Nkwo Obodo Awgunta; Central School Nenwenta; Nenwenta Town Hall; Comm. School Ugwueme I; Central School Ugwueme I; Central School Ugwueme II; Health Post Ugwueme; Ihite Village Square; Postal Agency Ugwueme; Cent. Sch. Nkwe II; Comm. Sch. Ugwueme II
Awgu	Owelli/Amoli/Ugbo/Ogugu	Central School Ogugu; Obodo Amanabo; Ibite Primary School; Obodo Village Square; Ugwu Amagbe; Enugu Owelli Comm. School; Upe School I; Upe School II; Uzam Square I; Owelli Court I; Nkwo Ogugu; Obodo Umunna; Primary School Anono Owelli; Obodo Uhuokpala; Central School Amoli; Ohumagu Village Square; Health Centre Amoli; Obodo Akpu-Oka; Otunku C. P. S; Joint School Ohumagu; Technical School Amoli; Obodo Umuagwu Amoli; C. P. S. Ugbokpala I; C. P. S. Ugbokpala II; Uzam Square II; Owelli Court II; Tech. Sch. Amoli; Inomalia Village Square; C. P. S. Ugbonabor I; C. P. S. Ugbonabor II; Obodo Ohu Village Square; C. P. S. Ngene Ugbo; Obodo Ukpamanu; Eke-Oga Village Square Ngeneugbo
Awgu	Isu Awa/Ogugu/Agbudu/Ituku	Enugu Isu Village Square; Obodo Enugu Isu Village Square; Umuamanu Village Square I; Umuamanu Village Square II; Central School Hall Isu; Egedu Village Hall; Ugwunator Village Square; Central School Agbudu I; Central School Agbudu II; Afor Market Square; St. Luke's Square; Enugu Agbudu Market Square; Obodo Umuonye Agbudu I; Central School Ituku; Umuonwo Square; Comm. Sec. School Ituku; Ofeiyi Square; Afoike Umuonyiba; Okwenachala Village Square; Ugbo Asha Village Square I; Umuamanu Village Square III; Obodo Umuonye Agbudu II; Ugbo Asha Village Square; Onuezi Village Square Ugwuagbo Ituku; Obodo Akpaka Village Square
Agwu	Obeagu	Amagu; Eziama; Ugwunawu; Ebenebe; Amorji; Agboani
Awgu	Ogbaku	Umuatubo Village Hall; Obodo Ajani (Enugu Mbio); Uhuagbom Village Hall; Mbio Primary School I; Obodo Ihiani; Comm. School Eziama; Eke Market Square; Obodo Ngene Ukwu (Awtor); Central School Ogbaku I; Central School Ogbaku II; Nwaugba (Unapproved Sec. School); Mbio Primary School II; Cent. Sch. Ogbaku III
Enugu East	Abakpa I	Abakpa Village Primary School I; Abakpa Village Primary School II; Abakpa Village Primary School III; Abakpa Village Primary School IV; Abakpa Village Primary School V; Abakpa Village Primary School VI; Abakpa Village Primary School VII; Abakpa Village Primary School VIII; Abakpa Village Primary School IX; Abakpa Village Primary School X; Abakpa Village Primary School XI; Housing Estate Primary School I; Housing Estate Primary School II; Housing Estate Primary School III; Housing Estate Primary School IV; Housing Estate Primary School V; Housing Estate Primary School VI; Housing Estate Primary School VII; Housing Estate Primary School VIII; Housing Estate Primary School IX; Housing Estate Primary School X; National Grammar School I; National Grammar School II; National Grammar School III; National Grammar School IV; National Grammar School V; National Grammar School VI; Abakaliki Road Primary School I; Abakaliki Road Primary School II; Abakaliki Road Primary School III; Abakaliki Road Primary School IV; Abakpa Girls Sec. Sch. I; Abakpa Girls Sec. Sch. II
Enugu East	Abakpa II	Ugwogo/Nnaji Park I; Ugwogo/Nnaji Park II; Ugwogo/Nnaji Park III; Ugwogo/Nnaji Park IV; Ugwogo/Nnaji Park V; Ugwogo/Nnaji Park VI; Ugwogo/Nnaji Park VII; Ugwogo/Nnaji Park VIII; Ugwogo/Nnaji Park IX; Tipper Park I; Tipper Park II; Tipper Park III; Tipper Park IV; Tipper Park V; Tipper Park VI; Tipper Park VII; Tipper Park VIII; Tipper Park IX; Tipper Park X; Federal Housing Primary School I; Federal Housing Primary School II
Enugu East	Umuenwene	Nike Town Hall I; Nike Town Hall II; Nike Town Hall III; Nike Town Hall IV; Nike Town Hall; Obinagu Villa; Obinagu Village Square I; Obinagu Village Square II; Ugbo Emma I; Ugbo Emma II; Ugwueke Village Square I; Ugwueke Village Square II
Enugu East	Amorji	C. P. S. Amorji I; C. P. S. Amorji II; C. P. S Amorji III; C. P. S. Amorji IV; Civic Centre Amorji III; Civic Centre I; Civic Centre II; Akama Village Square; Ugbo Akama
Enugu East	Mbuluiyiukwu	C. P. S. Ako Nike I; C. P. S. Ako Nike II; C. P. S. Ako Nike III; C. P. S. Ako Nike IV; C. P. S. Agbogazi Nike I; C. P. S. Agbogazi Nike II; C. P. S. Ogbeke Nike I; C. P. S. Ogbeke Nike II; C. P. S. Neke Uno I; C. P. S. Neke Uno II; C. P. S. Neke Odenigbo I; C. P. S. Neke Odenigbo II; C. P. S. Agbogazi Nike III; C. P. S. Agbogazi Nike IV
Enugu East	Mbuluowehe	C. P. S. Amokpo I; C. P. S. Amokpo II; C. P. S. Amokpo III; Alulu Village Square I; Alulu Village Square II; Alulu Village Square III; Ugbo Nokpa; Agu Amokpo; C. P. S. Amokpo IV; Nokpa Village Square; Amokpo Village Square; Ezema Village Square
Enugu East	Mbulu-Njodo West	Town School Emene I; Town School Emene II; Town School Emene III; Town School Emene IV; Central School Emene I; Central School Emene II; Central School Emene III; Central School Emene IV; Central School Emene V; Central School Emene VI; Practising School Emene I; Practising School Emene II; Practising School Emene III; Practising School Emene IV; Practising School Emene V; Obinagu Town I; Obinagu Town II; Nchatancha Square I; Nchatancha Square II; Airport Primary School I; Centre For Disabled; Nkpologwu Primary School I; Nkpologwu Primary School II; Nkpologwu Primary School III; Airport Primary School II
Enugu East	Umuchigbo	Umuchigbo Hall I; Umuchigbo Hall II; Umuchigbo Hall III; Umuchigbo Hall; Forgeroll Junction/Udoka Layout Airport Village; Ugbo Ogburugbu I; Ugbo Ogburugbu II; Umuchigbo Hall VI; Umuchigbo Hall VII; Umuchigbo Hall VIII
Enugu East	Trans-Ekulu	Open Square Opposite St. Philip I; Open Square Opposite St. Philip II; Open Square Opposite St. Philip III; Open Square Opposite St. Philip IV; Open Square Opposite St. Philip V; Open Square Along Umudioka I; Open Square Along Umudioka II; Open Square Along Umudioka III; Trans Ekulu Primary School I; Trans Ekulu Primary School II; Trans Ekulu Primary School III; Trans Ekulu Primary School IV; Trans Ekulu Primary School V; Ugbo Odogwu Primary School I; Ugbo Odogwu Primary School II; Ugbo Odogwu Primary School III; Agu Owa I; Agu Owa II; Agu Owa III; Agu Owa IV; Agu Owa V; Agu Abor Hall I; Agu Abor Hall II; Ugbo Odogwu Primary School IV; Ugbo Odogwu Primary School V; School Of Dental Tech. I; School Of Dental Tech. II; Trans Ekulu Primary School VI
Enugu East	Ibagwa-Nike/Edem	Ibagwa Nike Square I; Ibagwa Nike Square II; Edem Village Square I; Edem Village Square II; Amamkpuma Village Square; Ibagwa Nike Square III; Ibagwa Nike Square IV; Ugbo Iyioku Square; Umunonu Village Square
Enugu East	Ugwugo Nike	C. P. S. Ugwogo I; C. P. S. Ugwogo II; C. P. S. Ugwogo III; C. P. S. Ugwogo IV; C. P. S. Ugwogo V; C. P. S. Ugwogo VI; C. P. S. Ugwogo VII; Amakpaka Hall I; Amakpaka Hall II; Amakpaka Hall III; C. P. S. Ugwogo VIII
Enugu East	Mbulu-Njodo East	Akpoga Town Hall I; Akpoga Town Hall II; Akpoga Town Hall III; Nkomoro Onuogba Nike I; Nkomoro Onuogba Nike II; C. P. S. Akpoga I; C. P. S. Akpoga II; C. P. S. Akpoga III; C. P. S. Ezza Akpoga I; C. P. S. Ezza Akpoga II; C. P. S. Ezza Akpoga III; Cps Ezza Nkwubo I; Cps Ezza Nkwubo II; Cps Ezza Nkwubo III; Nkwubo Town Square I; Nkwubo Town Square II; Ugwuomu Nike I; Ugwuomu Nike II; Ugwuomu Nike III; Obinagu Ugwuomu I; Obinagu Ugwuomu II; Onuogba Town Square I; Onuogba Town Square II
Enugu North	Asata Township	Udi Road Primary School I; Udi Road Primary School II; Udi Road Primary School III; Udi Road Primary School IV; Udi Road Primary School V; Udi Road Primary School VI; Udi Road Primary School VII; Asata Primary School V; O'Conor Primary School I; O'Conor Primary School II; O'Conor Primary School III; O'Conor Primary School IV; O'Conor Primary School V; O'Conor Primary School VI; Asata Primary School I; Asata Primary School II; Asata Primary School III; Asata Primary School IV; Owerri Road Suya Spot
Enugu North	Umunevo	Afia Nine V/Square I; Afia Nine V/Square II; Afia Nine V/Square III; Afia Nine V/Square IV; Afia Nine V/Square V; Afia Nine V/Square VI; Afia Nine V/Square VII; Afia Nine V/Square VIII; Esut (Former City Girls') I; Esut (Former City Girls') II; Esut (Former City Girls') III; Esut (Former City Girls') IV; Esut (Former City Girls') V; Afia Nine V/Square IX; Esut (Former City Girls) VI; Esut (Former City Girls) VII
Enugu North	Ihewuzi	Ihewuzi Square I; Ihewuzi Square II; Ihewuzi Square III; Ihewuzi Square IV; Ihewuzi Square V; Onuator Square; Ihewuzi Square VI; Ihewuzi Square VII
Enugu North	Onu-Asata	Ogui Nike Primary School (St. Luke's) I; Ogui Nike Primary School (St. Luke's) II; Ogui Nike Primary School (St. Luke's) III; Ogui Nike Primary School (St. Luke's) IV; Ogui Nike Primary School (St. Luke's) V; Ogui Nike Primary School (St. Luke's) VI; Ogui Nike Primary School (St. Luke's) VII; Ogui Nike Primary School (St. Luke's) VIII; Ogui Nike Primary School (St. Luke's) IX
Enugu North	Ogbette East	Colliery Play Ground I; Colliery Play Ground II; Colliery Play Ground III; St. Peter's Primary School I; St. Peter's Primary School II; St. Peter's Primary School III; St. Patrick's Primary School I; St. Patrick's Primary School II; St. Patrick's Primary School III; Ejindu Park I; Ejindu Park II; Ejindu Park III; Ejindu Park IV; Obed Camp I; Obed Camp II; Obed Camp III; Ejindu Park V; Colliery Hall IV; St. Patrick's Primary School IV; Ejindu Park VI
Enugu North	Ogbette West	Broadrick Primary School I; Broadrick Primary School II; Broadrick Primary School III; Broadrick Primary School IV; Broadrick Primary School V; Broadrick Primary School VI; Broadrick Primary School VII; Special Education Centre I; Special Education Centre II; Special Education Centre III; Special Education Centre IV; Special Education Centre V; Ogbette Primary School I; Ogbette Primary School II; Ogbette Primary School III; Ogbette Primary School IV; Ogbette Primary School V; Ogbette Primary School VI; Ajagu Square I; Ajagu Square II; Ajagu Square III; Ajagu Square IV
Enugu North	Gui Newlayout	W. T. C. I; W. T. C. II; W. T. C. III; Obiagu Road Primary School I; Obiagu Road Primary School II; Queen's School I; Queen's School II; Queen's School III; Edinburgh Primary School I; Edinburgh Primary School II; Enugu Campus I; Enugu Campus II; Enugu Campus III; Enugu Campus IV; Edinburgh Primary School III; Edinburgh Primary School IV
Enugu North	China Town	Construction Primary School I; Construction Primary School II; Construction Primary School III; Construction Primary School IV; Construction Primary School V; Artisan Primary School I; Artisan Primary School II; Artisan Primary School III; Artisan Primary School IV; Artisan Primary School V; China Town Primary School I; China Town Primary School II; China Town Primary School III; China Town Primary School IV; Construction Primary School VI; China Town Primary School V; China Town Primary School VI
Enugu North	New Haven	New Haven Primary School I; New Haven Primary School II; New Haven Primary School III; New Haven Primary School IV; New Haven Primary School V; New Haven Primary School VI; New Haven Primary School VII; C. C. I. (Suya Spot) I; C. C. I. (Suya Spot) II; C. C. I. (Suya Spot) III; C. C. I. (Suya Spot) IV; C. C. I. (Suya Spot) V; C. C. I. (Suya Spot) VI; C. C. I. (Suya Spot) VII; C. C. I. (Suya Spot) VIII; Ugbo Okonkwo Square I; Ugbo Okonkwo Square II; N. E. P. A. Quarters (Near Vom Nursery)
Enugu North	Independence Layout	Former N. A. F. Nursery School I; Former N. A. F. Nursery School II; Okpara Square I; Okpara Square II; Okpara Square III; Okpara Square IV; Okpara Square V; Okpara Square VI; Federal Government School I; Federal Government School II; I. M. T. Campus I; I. M. T. Campus II; Federal Government School III; Nza St. Square
Enugu North	Udi Siding/Iva Valley	Colliery Hall I; Colliery Hall II; Colliery Hall III; St. Patrick's Iva-Valley I; St. Patrick's Iva-Valley II; Colliery Primary School; Iva-Valley Primary School; Camp II Iva-Valley I; Camp II Iva-Valley II; Camp II Iva-Valley III; Camp II Iva-Valley IV; Pottery Iva-Valley I; Pottery Iva-Valley II; Pottery Iva-Valley III; Pottery Iva-Valley IV; Pottery Iva-Valley V; Welfare Hall I; Welfare Hall II; Welfare Hall III; Prison's Club I; Prison's Club II; Prison's Club III; Prison's Club IV; Ugwuakulu Primary School Enugu Ngwo I; Ugwuakulu Primary School Enugu Ngwo II; Colliery Tech. School I; Colliery Tech. School II; Industrial Mission Ngwo; Aria Road Primary School I; Aria Road Primary School II; Hill-Top Ngwo I; Hill-Top Ngwo II; Hill-Top Ngwo III; Hill-Top Ngwo IV; Welfare Hall; Ugwu Akulu Primary School Enugu Ngwo III; Ugwu Akulu Primary School Enugu Ngwo IV; Ugwu Akulu Primary School Enugu Ngwo V; Hill Top Ngwo V; Hill Top Ngwo VI; Camp II Iva Valley; Aria Road Primary School III
Enugu North	Ogui Township	Salvation Army Primary School I; Salvation Army Primary School II; Salvation Army Primary School III; Salvation Army Primary School IV; Methodist Primary School I; Methodist Primary School II; Methodist Primary School III; Carter Street Primary School I; Carter Street Primary School II; Carter Street Primary School III; Carter Street Primary School IV; Carter Street Primary School V; Methodist Primary School IV; Methodist Primary School V
Enugu South	Amechi I	Imo Transport Company, 360 Agbani Road I; Imo Transport Company, 360 Agbani Road II; Imo Transport Company, 360 Agbani Road III; Imo Transport Company, 360 Agbani Road IV; Imo Transport Company, 360 Agbani Road V; Imo Transport Company, 360 Agbani Road VI; Imo Transport Company, 360 Agbani Road VII; Primary School, Amechi I; Primary School, Amechi II; Primary School, Amechi III; Primary School, Amechi IV; Primary School, Amechi V; Primary School, Amechi VI; Primary School, Amechi VII; Primary School, Amechi VIII; Primary School, Amechi IX; Primary School, Amechi X; Primary School, Amechi XI; Primary School Amechi XII; Imo Transport Company, 360 Agbani Road VIII; Imo Transport Company, 360 Agbani Road IX
Enugu South	Amechi II	C. P. S. Amechi I; C. P. S. Amechi II; C. P. S. Amechi III; C. P. S. Amechi IV; C. P. S. Amechi V; C. P. S. Amechi VI; C. P. S. Amechi VII; C. P. S. Amechi VIII; C. P. S. Amechi IX; C. P. S. Amechi X; Ndiorie Amechi I; Ndiorie Amechi II; Ndiorie Amechi III; Ndiorie Amechi IV; Ndiorie Amechi V; Eke Otu Market Square
Enugu South	Obeagu I	Community Secondary School, Obeagu I; Community Secondary School, Obeagu II; Community Secondary School, Obeagu III; Community Secondary School, Obeagu IV; Community Secondary School, Obeagu V; Community Secondary School, Obeagu VI; Anianya Village Square I; Anianya Village Square II; Igwekamma Amegu Village Square I; Igwekamma Amegu Village Square II; Igwekamma Amegu Village Square III
Enugu South	Uwani East	Uwani River Primary School I; Uwani River Primary School II; Uwani River Primary School III; St. Mary's, Bigard I; St. Mary's, Bigard II; St. Mary's, Bigard III; St. Mary's, Bigard IV; Zik Avenue Primary School I; Zik Avenue Primary School II; Zik Avenue Primary School III; Zik Avenue Primary School IV; Agbani Road Primary School I; Agbani Road Primary School II; Agbani Road Primary School III; Agbani Road Primary School IV; Onwudiwe Park I; Onwudiwe Park II; Onwudiwe Park III; Onwudiwe Park IV; Uwani River Primary School IV; Zik Avenue Primary School V; Zik Avenue Primary School VI
Enugu South	Uwani West	Uwani Secondary School I; Uwani Secondary School II; Uwani Secondary School III; Uwani Secondary School IV; Niger Close Primary School I; Niger Close Primary School II; Niger Close Primary School III; Robinson Street Primary School I; Robinson Street Primary School II; Robinson Street Primary School III; Cheshire Home I; Cheshire Home II; Cheshire Home III; Cheshire Home IV; Cheshire Home V; Cheshire Home VI; Robinson Street Primary School IV; Robinson Street Primary School V
Enugu South	Achara Layout East	P&T Training School, Agbani Road (Post Office Premises) I; P&T Training School, Agbani Road (Post Office Premises) II; Idaw River Primary School I; Idaw River Primary School II; Idaw River Primary School III; Idaw River Secondary School I; Idaw River Secondary School II; Idaw River Secondary School III; Idaw River Secondary School IV; Idaw River Secondary School VIII; P&T Training School Agbani Road (Post Office) III
Enugu South	Achara Layout West	Achara Layout Primary School I; Achara Layout Primary School II; Achara Layout Primary School III; Achara Layout Primary School IV; Achara Layout Primary School V; Achara Layout Primary School VI; Achara Layout Primary School VII; Achara Layout Primary School VIII; Achara Layout Primary School IX; Igbariam Primary School I; Igbariam Primary School II; Igbariam Primary School III; Igbariam Primary School IV; Igbariam Primary School V; Igbariam Primary School VI; Igbariam Primary School VII; Igbariam Primary School VIII; Achara Layout Primary School X; Achara Layout Primary School XI; Igbariam Primary School IX
Enugu South	Awkunanaw East	Union Secondary School, Awkunanaw I; Union Secondary School, Awkunanaw II; Union Secondary School, Awkunanaw III; Union Secondary School, Awkunanaw IV; Union Secondary School, Awkunanaw V; Union Secondary School, Awkunanaw VI; Union Secondary School, Awkunanaw VII; Union Secondary School, Awkunanaw VIII; Union Secondary School, Awkunanaw IX; Union Secondary School, Awkunanaw X; Union Secondary School, Awkunanaw XI; Union Secondary School, Awkunanaw XII; Union Secondary School, Awkunanaw XIII; Union Secondary School, Awkunanaw XIV; Union Secondary School, Awkunanaw XV; Union Sec. School Awkunanaw XVI; Union Sec. School Awkunanaw XVII
Enugu South	Awkunanaw West	Girls' Grammar School, Awkunanaw I; Girls' Grammar School, Awkunanaw II; Girls' Grammar School, Awkunanaw III; Girls' Grammar School, Awkunanaw IV; Girls' Grammar School, Awkunanaw V; Girls' Grammar School, Awkunanaw VI; Girls' Grammar School, Awkunanaw VII; Girls' Grammar School, Awkunanaw VIII; Girl's Grammar School Awkunanaw IX; Girl's Grammar School Awkunanaw X
Enugu South	Ugwuaji	Central School, Ugwuaji I; Central School, Ugwuaji II; Orie Market Square; C. P. S., Ugwuaji I; C. P. S., Ugwuaji II; C. P. S., Ugwuaji III; C. P. S., Ugwuaji IV; Obodo Ani-Ira Square; Ihu Aneke Village Square; Umunugwu Village Hall; Afor Market Square
Enugu South	Obeagu II	Central School, Obeagu I; Central School, Obeagu II; St. James Primary School, Obeagu I; St. James Primary School, Obeagu II; St. James Primary School, Obeagu III; St. James Primary School, Obeagu IV; St. James Primary School, Obeagu V; Central School, Obeagu III; Central School Obeagu IV; St. James Primary School Obeagu VI; St. James Primary School Obeagu VII
Enugu South	Akwuke	Central School, Akwuke I; Central School, Akwuke II; Central School, Akwuke III; Central School, Akwuke IV; Central School, Akwuke V; Entraco Bus Terminus Garriki I; Entraco Bus Terminus Garriki II; Entraco Bus Terminus Garriki III; Entraco Bus Terminus Garriki IV; Entraco Bus Terminus Garriki V; Onunwa-Ojukwu Attakwu Square; Obodo Nkpokoro Echime Square; Eke Market Square
Enugu South	Maryland	New Era Boys' Secondary School (Nebss) I; New Era Boys' Secondary School (Nebss) II; New Era Boys' Secondary School (Nebss) III; Ayo Open Space; Timber Shed I; Timber Shed II; C. S. S. Ndiagu Amechi I; C. S. S. Ndiagu Amechi II; C. S. S. Ndiagu Amechi III; New Era Boys Sec. School IV; Timber Shed III
Ezeagu	Olo/Amagu Umulokpa I	Amagu Umulokpa C. P. S.; Amagu Amamdim Hall; C. P. S. Ibite Olo I; C. P. S. Ibite Olo II; C. P. S. Achalla Owa; C. P. S. Amandim Olo I; Ugbo Ozoume/Prisons Farms; C. P. S. Amandim Olo II; Amagu Amandim Hall
Ezeagu	Awha	Madonna Maternity; C. P. S. Awha Ndiagu I; C. P. S. Awha Ndiagu II; C. P. S. Agbagbo I; C. P. S. Agbagbo II; C. P. S. Agbagbo III; C. P. S. Agbagbo IV; C. P. S. Aguobu Awha Ndiagu; Oriediaba Square Awha Ndiagu
Ezeagu	Aguobu-Owa 1	Eke Market Square; C. P. S. Ozom; Obodo Agunochi; Obodo Eketeke Square; C. P. S. Obodo Ngwu; C. S. Aguobu-Owa; Obodo Okpoyo Town Hall; P. S. Obodo Ngwu II; Obodo Isi Akpu Village Square
Ezeagu	Aguobu-Owa 11	Afia Ezema Mkt. Sq.; U. P. S. Ezema I; U. P. S. Ezema II; C. P. S. Umudim I; C. P. S. Umudim II; S. P. S. Umuaji I; S. P. S. Umuaji II; S. P. S. Ezema III; Ezibuanako Village Square; Obodo Akwali Sq
Ezeagu	Umana Ndiagu	Owellemba Village Hall; C. P. S. Umana Ndiuno; P. S. Aguagbaja Ndiagu I; P. S. Kkaguagbaja Ndiagu II; C. P. S. Isigwu Umana; C. P. S. C. S. Aguagbaja I; Nkwoalusi Market Square I; Nkwoalusi Market Square II; C. S. Aguagbaja II; P. S. Agu Agbaja Ndiagu III
Ezeagu	Agba Umana	Community Primary School Agba Umana I; Community Primary School Agba Umana II; Community Primary S0chool Agba Umana III; C. S. Umana; Umueze Village Hall I; Umueze Village Hall II
Ezeagu	Aguobu (Umumba)	Central School Aguobu-Umuba I; Community Primary School Aguobu-Umuba II; I. P. S. Azungene; Community Primary School Umumba Ndiagu I; Community Primary School Umumba Ndiagu II; Community Primary School Umumba Ndiagu Ext.; C. P. S. Umumba Ndiagu III; Idume Aguobu Village Square
Ezeagu	Umumba Ndiumo	Umudama Hall; C. P. S. Umumba Ndiuno; C. S. Okpueze; C. P. S. Aguoba Umumba; Idume Village Square; Ihuaji Village Square
Ezeagu	Oghe I	C. P. S. Amankwo Ndiagu; C. P. S. Amankwo Imezi I; C. P. S. Amankwo Imezi II; C. P. S. Akama Oghe I; C. P. S. Akama Oghe II; Umuochi Square
Ezeagu	Oghe II	Ihuonyia Village Square I; Ihuonyia Village Square II; M. P. S. Amansiodo Imezi I; M. P. S. Amansiodo Imezi II; M. P. S. Amansiodo Imezi III; M. P. S. Amansiodo Imezi IV
Ezeagu	Imezi Owa I	P. S. Umudioha I; P. S. Umudioha II; Aniakaa Umuaji Square; C. P. S. Umuaji/Umudim I; C. P. S. Ukpata Ezema I; C. P. S. Ukpata Ezema II; C. P. S. Umuaji/Imudim II; C. P. S. Ukpata Ezema III
Ezeagu	Imezi Owa II	Abonuzu Public Square; Obodo Nzu Public Square I; Obodo Nzu Public Square II; C. S. Imezi-Owa; Onubuezeani Square; Umuezedume Hall; Agbani Square; Abonuzu Public Square II; Ani Enugwu Square
Ezeagu	Mgbagbu Owa I	C. P. S. Umuaji I; C. P. S. Umuaji II; C. P. S. Ezema; C. P. S. Umudim; Mgbagbu-Owa Town Hall; C. P. S. Umuaji III; C. P. S. Umudim II
Ezeagu	Mgbagbu Owa II	Nchanawa Village Square; Ugwuanigbo I; Ugwuanigbo II; Madonna Maternity; Nwafor Ugwuakpa; Nchanawa Village Square II
Ezeagu	Mgbagbu Owa III	Nkwo Oyofo Square I; Nkwo Oyofo Square II; Obodocha Square I; Obodocha Square II; Obodocha Square III; Nkwo Oyofo Square III
Ezeagu	Iwollo	L. T. C. Iwollo I; C. P. S. Ugwuike Iwollo; C. P. S. Ugwuokpa I; Immama Iwollo; C. P. S. Aguobu Iwollo; Ndibunugwu Iwollo; C. P. S. Ugwuokpa II; Obodo Onueke Square; Ogbugbuagu Hall I
Ezeagu	Obinofia	Obodo Iyi Market Square; C. P. S. Obinofia Ndiuno I; C. P. S. Obinofia Ndiagu; C. S. Obinofia Ndiuno; C. S. Obinofia Ndiagu; C. S. Ihuezed Obinofia; Umueze Village Square; M. P. S. Obinofia; Okposhi Market Square; Ugwuezeabushi Square
Ezeagu	Okpogho	C. P. S. Okpogho Mbuta; Obuagu Square I; Obuagu Square II; C. P. S. Okpogho Okube; Ukwuagba Village Square
Ezeagu	Obe Agu Umana	C. P. S. Obeleagu; Okpudo Hall I; Okpudo Hall II; Ogwubudo Square I; Ogwubudo Square II; Amube Square; C. P. S. Omughu; Ugwuakulu Hall I; Ugwuakulu Hall II; Umualiongene Square
Ezeagu	Ulo/Amagu/Umulokpa II	C. P. S. Ezema Olo I; C. P. S. Ezema Olo II; C. P. S. Ezema Olo III; C. P. S. Ezema Olo IV; C. P. S Awene Olo I; C. P. S Awene Olo II; C. P. S Awene Olo III; C. P. S. Ogulogu I; C. P. S. Ogulogu II; C. P. S. Awene Olo IV
Igbo Etiti	Aku I	Ameguwenu Village Hall; Ameguwani Village Square I; Ameguwani Village Square II; Owere Village Square; Agumoha Village Square; Premier Primary School; Umudimalokeocha Village Hall; Amani Village Square
Igbo Etiti	Aku II	Use Village Square; Uwani Amaogbo Village Square; Uwani Amabokwu; Uwenu Amabokwu; Umudingwoji Village Square; Umudimagada Village Square; Amabokwu Primary School
Igbo Etiti	Aku III	Uwani Otobo Village Square; Amadieffia Village Square; Amankpo Village Square; Central School, Aku; Umudo Offienyi Village Hall I; Umudo Offienyi Village Hall II; Amagu Uwani Village Hall I; Amagu Uwani Village Hall II; Amaezike Village Hall I; Amaezike Village Hall II
Igbo Etiti	Aku IV	Otobo Umudikwu; Obu Umuzoke; Egbugwu Primary School; Obu Ameti Square I; Obu Ameti Square II; Obu Diyoke; Amuwani Ugwunani; Ugwunani Primary School; Otobo Enu Nkwo Lelegu; Oye Village Square Lelegu; Obu Ikenyi Odobaja; Old Pump Nua
Igbo Etiti	Aku V (Idueme)	Otobo Etiti Obie; Otobo Ezeani Obie; Obu Umuori Obie; Union Primary School, Amogwu; Otobo Uwani Aram; Otobo Amaechem I; Otobo Amaechem II; Umuoju Hall; Umuonyemelege Village Hall; Umuguru Village Hall; Amauwani Orie Village Square; Igboweruka Village Square
Igbo Etiti	Ekwegbe I	Amadulu Hall; Amangwu Hall; Hill-Top School, Ukopi; Umuevulike Hall; Amadiligwe Hall I; Amadiligwe Hall II; Amewa Hall; Ufu Primary School I; Ufu Primary School II; Agu Udele Square
Igbo Etiti	Ekwegbe II	Ajuona Hall/Aguru Hall; Amaonucha Primary School; Ogbodu Hall; Community Primary School Agu Ekwegbe; Ibegama Hall; Etiti Amaobu Hall; C. P. S. Aguekwegbe II
Igbo Etiti	Ohaodo I	Umuagwoani Village Hall; Umuezikechima Hall; Amufio Village Hall; Umugweleogo Hall; Central School, Ohodo; Akwashi Village Square
Igbo Etiti	Ohaodo II	Union Primary School, Ohodo; Amauwani Village Hall; Orukunkpuru Adada Village Hall; Umuelim Village Hall; C. P. S. Ohodo
Igbo Etiti	Ozalla I	Umuozota Hall; Gbudugbu Hall; Ibagwa Hall; Ugwuegba Square; C. P. S. Ozalla; Amokpo Hall; Okebuleke Hall; Abaedem Hall; Ndiagu Umolumo Village Square; Umudim Village Square; Commercial Sec. School Ozalla
Igbo Etiti	Ozalla II	Oruku/Ndiugwu Hall; Umuezereje Hall; A. P. S. Ozalla/Umueze Hall; Uwani Umunagu Hall; Odenigbo Square; Umuezugwoke Hall; U. P. S. Ozalla; Umuozor Hall; Umukeze Village Square
Igbo Etiti	Diogbe	Diogbe Town Hall I; Diogbe Town Hall II; Diogbe Town Hall III; Central School, Diogbe I; Central School, Diogbe II; Central School, Diogbe III;
Igbo Etiti	Ikolo/Ohebe	Ameti Uwani Hall; Ameti Uwelu Hall; Ikolo Ani Hall; Ikolo Hall; Amaedem Hall I; Amaedem Hall II; Obu Obeke I; Obu Umueze Ohebe; Obu Omashi; Ejuona Primary School Ohebe; Obu Umuiyida; Otobo Ohodo; Ikolo Market Square
Igbo Etiti	Onyohor/Ochima/Idoha	C. P. S. Onyohor I; Ogbodo Square; C. P. S. Ochima I; C. P. S. Ochima II; C. P. S. Ochima III; Amaudara Hall I; Amaudara Hall II; Umuokwor Hall; C. P. S. Idoha I; C. P. S. Onyohor II; C. P. S. Idoha II
Igbo Etiti	Ejuoha/Udeme	Uwani Ezike Village Hall I; Uwani Ezike Village Hall II; Umuehelete Village Hall I; Umuehelete Village Hall II; Ugwunagbo Village Hall I; Ugwunagbo Village Hall II; Ugwunagbo Village Hall III; Udueme Village Hall; Afor Market Square; Central School, Udueme I; Central School, Udueme II; Umulee Ugwunagbo; Okuzu Oda
Igbo Etiti	Ukehe I	Amadim Primary School; Ukwu Offor Square; Obu Ugwuchime I; Obu Ugwuchime II; C. P. S. Agu Ukehe I; C. P. S. Agu Ukehe II; Obu Odo-Owere Square; Isigbo Square; Obu Chimaemusi Square
Igbo Etiti	Ukehe II	Ugwuode Reg. Centre I; Umuoffiagu Reg. Centre I; Emelumgini Centre I; Agbabunanwankwo Village Square; Obu Bekee; Umuoffiagu Reg. Centre II; Umualeke Primary School; Umuofiagu Primary School; Emelumgini Village Square II; Agbabunanwankwo Village Square III
Igbo Etiti	Ukehe III	C. P. S. Ezi-Ukehe I; C. P. S. Ezi-Ukehe II; Eke Ugwu Market Square; Orinandu C. S. Ukehe; Ndi-Edo Village Square; Obu Odoberre Ndi-Ugo Square; Amangwu Village Square; Ota Loyo Amube Square
Igbo Etiti	Ukehe IV	Umurusi C. P. S. Ukehe; Amaekwefu Hall; Amauwani Primary School I; Amauwani Primary School II; Girls' Secondary School, Ukehe; Eke Achara Market Square; Amaekwefu Village Hall; Obori Umurusi Village Hall; Obu Arua Obute Square; Obu Odobinagu Square; Obu Okwu Ekem Umuojike
Igbo Etiti	Ukehe V	Ogbodo Ukpata Civic Hall; U. P. S. Amanefi; Ezi Amugwu Civic Hall; Obu Ngwu Oyida Square; Umu Abaka Village Square
Igbo Etiti	Umunko	Amagodo Hall; Oriental Hall I; Ohene Village Hall; Comm. Secondary School, Umunko; C. P. S. Umunko; Oriental Hall II; Community Secondary School, Umunko; Health Post Umunko
Igbo Eze North	Essodo 1	C. S. Aji; Umuenada Hall I; Orie Mam Asanya; Umu Enwe Hall; Umudenyi Hall; C. P. S. Umuodeje; Ofu Hall; C. P. S. Mboshi Block II; Mboshi Aji; Umuodo Hall; C. P. S. Ulo N'Ayi; Ulo Oche Oretere; Umu Okoro Hall; U. P. S. Aji; Umuonada Hall II
Igbo Eze North	Essodo 11	Umuana Hall; Umuabata/Umuogbo-Agu; Orie Orba; C. P. S. Umuagama I; C. P. S. Umuagama II; Umu-Owaa Village Square; Near St. Mary's Church Umuagama; C. P. S. Umuogbo-Agu; Orie Orba II
Igbo Eze North	Essodo 111	Ufodo; U. P. S. Umuogbo-Ulo; Umuowoko Hall; Umuogbo - Ekposhi; Umuogbo Inyi; C. P. S. Inyi Border
Igbo Eze North	Ette 1	C. P. S. Umunebe; C. P. S. Ogbuyaga; C. P. S. Ogodo; C. P. S. Ijekpe; C. P. S. Obida; Ugbogbo Umunebe Square
Igbo Eze North	Ette 11	C. P. S. Adokpe I; C. P. S. Adokpe II; C. P. S. Ette-Uno I; C. P. S. Ogador; C. P. S. Umuishi I; Ikpomabe Umuishi Hall; C. P. S. Ogili Ama; C. P. S. Umuasanya; C. P. S. Umuishi II; C. P. S. Ogo Ayishi
Igbo Eze North	Ette Central	Bore-Hole Square; Akpamkpa Hall; 1 Pole Ugbele; Community Primary School Umuebe-Agu; Community Primary School Umundeba; C. P. S. Elekpe; Otubele Square I; Odukwu Square II; C. P. S. Olepe
Igbo Eze North	Umuitodo I	Community Primary School Igbelle-Enugu-Ezike; Mkpuruatama; Umuogbo Hall; Community Primary School Ugwu Amufie; Umu-Ose Hall I; Community Primary School Itorosoko; Umu-Ose Hall II
Igbo Eze North	Umuitodo II	C. S. Achalla; Umuopu Hall; C. P. S. Umuagbedo-Ulo I; C. P. S. Umuagbedo-Ulo II; C. P. S. Umuagbedo-Agu; Umuaba Hall; C. P. S. Ikpuiga
Igbo Eze North	Umuitodo III	Umuodu Hall; Ugwu Abudu; C. P. S. Imufu; C. P. S. Olido II; Umu-Ossa Hall; Orukpa Hall; C. P. S. Olido I; Mgbede Hall; Uloche Eha; Okpaligbo Hall; Uwewu Hall
Igbo Eze North	Ezzodo	C. P. S. Uda I; C. P. S. Uda II; Umuozzi Hall; Umuokwo Udah Hall; C. S. S. Uda; C. P. S. Uroshi; C. P. S. Uda III; Umuja Hall Okpaligbo; Uloche Umu-Ossanyi
Igbo Eze North	Umuozzi I	Ukwuinyi Square; Umu Ossai; C. P. S. Ugwueze Nkpume; C. P. S. Iyionu; Ukwu Mango I; Ukwu Mango II; Nkwo Iyionu; Oye Ogboli; C. P. S. Aguibeje I
Igbo Eze North	Umuozzi II	C. S. Nkwo-Ulo; C. S. Igogoro; C. P. S. I Igogoro; Umuidoko Hall; Umuja Square; C. P. S. II Igogoro; C. P. S. III Igogoro; Umuozzi-Ogbene Agu Hall; Ulo-Oche Oli; Umuaji Hall; Amope Hall; Umuawuya Village Square
Igbo Eze North	Umuozzi III	Umueso Hall; Umueso Hall II; Akamagbo Hall I; Amaeze Hall I; Amaeze Hall II; Nkwo Market Square I; Umura U. P. S I; Ukwu Abugu Hall I; Ukwu Abugu Hall II; Nkwo Market Square II; Akamagbo Hall II; Amura U. P. S. II; Okporo Odo-Ugwuoke
Igbo Eze North	Umuozzi IV	Ogbodu Hall; C. P. S. Amoba Inyi; U. P. S. Amaube; U. P. S. Amachi; A. P. S. Akpa Inyi I; A. P. S. Akpa Inyi II; C. P. S. Amaoba Inyi; C. P. S. Amaube Inyi II
Igbo Eze North	Umuozzi V	Uloche Anwama; T. S. I. Ogrute I; Uloche Ikpeta; Otobo Ekposhi; Uloche Ukwuinyi; Ikem Obinetiti; Eke Ozzi Market Square; Uloche Obollo; T. S. I. Ogrute II
Igbo Eze North	Umuozzi VI	C. P. S. Mkpamte I; C. P. S. Mkpamte II; C. P. S. Okata; C. S. Onicha I; Uloche Onicha; U. P. S. Onicha; Ulo Oche Okwura; Ulo Oche Umu-Ossai; Ulo Oche Okpaga Umu-Ossai; C. P. S. Okata II; C. S. Onicha II
Igbo Eze North	Umuozzi VII	C. S. Umuida; A. P. S. Umuida; Ogene Hall Umuida I; Orie Akpatalu Hall Umuida; Umuaji Hall Umuida; C. P. S. Umushene; Umuadogwa Hall Umuida; Ija Inere Umuida; Ajara Umuonu; Agu-Oli Inere; Agu-Ego Umuadogwa; Ogene Hall Umuida II
Igbo Eze North	Umuozzi VIII	Umuogbo Square; C. P. S. Ajara Odonu I; C. P. S. Ajara Odonu II; C. P. S. Isiugwu (Umuodaja Square); C. P. S. Ajara I; C. P. S. Ajara II; C. P. S. Aguogbala; C. P. S. Owereze; C. P. S. Amaja
Igbo Eze North	Umuozzi IX	Ichama; Ogbo Okorobo; C. P. S. Umuopu I; C. P. S. Umuopu II; C. P. S. Umuopu Umueze; C. P. S. Aguego Umuopu; Nkwo Odeja; Umu Azegba Hall
Igbo Eze North	Umuozzi X	Okpowolike; Anwama; Orie Okpo; C. P. S. Ezillo; Uloche Ikem; C. P. S. Ikpamodo; Okpo Borehole; Okodu Hall; Ishalla Okpo; C. P. S. Okpo; Ulowa Ezillo
Igbo Eze South	Alor Agu	C. P. S. Umuidu; C. P. S. I, Block III; Afor Market Square I; C. P. S. II Block I; C. P. S. II Block II; Otobo Aloragu Square; Afor Market Square II; C. P. S. Umuidu II
Igbo Eze South	Amebo /Hausa/ Yoruba	Old Market Square I; Umudi Amaji Hall I; C. P. S. Agu Ogbara; C. P. S. Eburu Miri; Umuaroji Centre I; Old Market Square II; Otobo Ikemu; Umuaroji Centre II; Umuidi Amaji Hall II
Igbo Eze South	Ezema Ward	Ikolo Village Site; C. P. S. Ibagwa; Near St. John's Eburumiri; Amebo Ndadu; C. P. S. Imilike Ibagwa; Owerre Village Hall; Otobo Ndadu Ugwuanyi
Igbo Eze South	Iheaka (Ugo Akoyi)	C. P. S. I Akoyi; C. P. S. Ugo I; C. P. S. II Akoyi; Amagu Hall I; Umu Amaeze I; C. P. S. Ugo II; Amagu Hall II; Umu Amaeze II
Igbo Eze South	Iheaka (Likki/Akutara Ward)	Umueze Onu I; Ishienu Hall I; C/School Iheaka I; C/School Iheaka II; Umuegwu; Ore Ukwuagba I; Ore Ukwugba II; Ishienu Hall II; Umueze Onu II; Ihaka Market Square
Igbo Eze South	Iheakpu (Ezzi Ngwu Ward)	Umudiaba Hall; Umuahugwu Hall; Umuijeja Hall; Umuaka Hall I; Achebule Hall; Umuokwu Hall; Umuaka Hall II
Igbo Eze South	Iheakpu (Ajuona Ogbagu Ward)	Nkporogu Hall I; Uwani Asebo I; C. P. S. Iheakpu I; C. P. S. Iheakpu II; Nkporogu Hall II; Uwani Asebo II
Igbo Eze South	Itchi/Uwani I	Otobo Igbudu I; Amebo Hall I; Okka Village Hall; Otobo Ndiagu Umu Ogbu; Amebo Hall II; C. P. S. Itchi; Otobo Igbudu II
Igbo Eze South	Itchi/Uwani II	Amaekpuru; C. P. S. Itchiagu; Umuakanyi I; Umuakanyi II; Itchi I; Otobo Agu Unu; C. P. S. Ichi Agu; Otobo Iyioko; Otobo Erati
Igbo Eze South	Nkalagu Obukpa	C. P. S. Nkalagu Obukpa; Ihe Civic Centre; Eda Mbekwu; Otobo Okparigbo; C. P. S. Elu-Ohe
Igbo Eze South	Ovoko (Ajuona Ward)	C. P. S. Ovoko Ajuona I; Umuahire Hall; Community Council Hall; C. P. S. Ovoko Ajuona II; Umuahire Hall II
Igbo Eze South	Ovoko (Umuelo/Ovoko Agu Ward)	Otobo Umuelo; C. P. S Ovoko Agu I; Umueze- Avuru Village Hall; Ibeku Village Hall; Ogwude Village Hall; Ohagu Village Hall; Umujioha Village Hall; Otobo Igbogebe; Otobo Umulolo Agu; Otobo Leke; Otobo Emelem; C. P. S. Avoko Agu II
Igbo Eze South	Ovoko (Umulolo Ward)	Umugbabe Village Hall I; Ameboda Village Hall; Umuogburugbu; Otobo Umulolo; Amofia Village Hall; C. P. S. Ovoko Ulo I; Otobo Ameboda; Umugbabe Hall II; C. P. S. Ovoko Ulo II
Igbo Eze South	Uhunowerre	Eketekelu Hall I; Amelem I; Amakpu; Eketekalu Hall II; Amelem II
Igbo Eze South	Unadu	Unadu Council Hall; Ore Akpakparani Hall I; C. P. S. I Block II; C. P. S. II Block I; Otobo Enwerem; Unadu Council Hall I; Obaka Agu Village Square
Isi Uzo	Ikem I	Umuezutu; Obeagu; Primary School Isioroto; Nkpunato; Odumogwu; Ogelegwu; C. C. S. Ikem Uno; Nzute Igbo; Agbuhu
Isi Uzo	Ikem II	Akpugo Ikem Nkwo; Adama; Onokoro Ebia; Umuata; Umueje; C. S. Umuaram; Ogbuegbo; Nkwo Ugwuagbatu; Ore Amudam; C. S. Ikem Nkwo; Ngelefi Umuaram; Ojeshi; Isi-Ado; Umu-Oshim; Ishiolu Village Square; Onicha Ebia Village Square
Isi Uzo	Neke I	Okpurukpu Hall; Onueme Hall; Ugwuadaka; Oboro Isienu; Agudene Neke Primary School; Primary School Onueme
Isi Uzo	Neke II	Ugwueke Village Square; Echiku Primary School; Ojete; Okwuru; Umu-Onu Village Square
Isi Uzo	Mbu I	C. S. Mbu Amon; Onuajuona Village Hall; Ogbodu Village Square; Buruamanyi Primary School; Onunkwo Uwani; Ugwuanama Primary School; Akpoga Primary School; Iyiakwa M. F. C. Primary School
Isi Uzo	Mbu II	C. P. S. Mbu Akpoti; Aharu Primary School; Agudene Mbu Primary School; Uwenu Agudene Village Square; Ukpoka Primary School; Akanugu M. F. C. Primary School; Ngene Ogbuagu Village Square
Isi Uzo	Umualor	Onodu Primary School; Agudene Umuezeogbo; Afor Ulo Hall; Aliyi Village Hall; Aba Village Hall; Agudene Aliyi Primary School; Ezza Aliyi Primary School; Igbo Etiti Village Square; Odobido Primary School
Isi Uzo	Ehamufu I	Ugwuoduma Isu Village Hall; Okpirigwu Aguamede; Ikpakpara Primary School; Ememamaru; Obodo Nabo; Amegbu; Onuegu; Odenigbo; Odoba Uzam; Ofuru/Ulo Isu; Ogburu; Okpokwu Umu Ogbodo Primary School; Ogoiraba Agu-Amaede Primary School; Akpueze Akpueze Agu Amede Village Hall; Ishienyi Agu Amede Primary School
Isi Uzo	Ehamufu II	Umuhu Akpaka; Umuokpara Umuhu; Umuozibo Umuhu; Amofia; Amauzam; Eha Town School; Over Rail Primary School; Idolugbu; Ndiagu Umuoziobo Primary School; Ndiagu Amofia Primary School; Ihe Village Square; Akparata
Isi Uzo	Ehamufu III	Umujiovu Alu; Ama-Ogbu; Amaobelebe; Amakpaka; Obibi Umuogiri; Omulor; Umoke Amasogiji; College Of Education; Ortu; Ape; Okpokwu Mgbuji; Okpirigwu; Ngele Aguiyi; Mgbede; Ogbete Eha; Umujiovu Elu
Isi Uzo	Ehamufu IV	Ihenyi Amegu Village Hall; Ngele Ikpa Primary School; Amaezeaka Village Square; Ogbuzor Ihenyi Village Square; Obodo Ede Amede; Onueme Amede; Usorere; Akasa Uzam; Orokoro; Ogbuagu; Ofiolu; Usereke Ihenyi Village Square; Ngelekwe Village Square; Uzam Ugwu Village Square; Ngelefi Village Square
Nkanu East	Amechi/Idodo/Oruku	C. S. Eziama Amechi Idodo; Orie Eziama Market Square; Eke Oruku Market Square I; C. S. Uzam Amechi Idodo I; Obinagu Village Square; Community Primary School Umuode; Amaoye Ohuani Square; Eke Umuode Market Square; C. S. Uzam Amechi Idodo II; Eke Oruku Market Square II
Nkanu East	Amankanu/Ogbahu	C. S. Ogbahu I; U. P. S. Odobido Ugbahu; Union School Amankanu I; Union School Amankanu II; C. S. Ogbahu II; Ogbahu Rail Station; Ohuakpa Village Square; Eke Ubahu Village Square; Union School Amankanu III
Nkanu East	Akpofu/Isienu/Amagunze	Obodo Uvuru Eke Town Hall; C. S. Akpofu; C. S. Akpofu Ikoro Ndiagu I; Nkwo Market Square; Court Premises Isienu I; Ogo Akum Village Square; River Side Primary School Osu; Court Premises II; Eke Market Square; Obodo Nvu Village Square; Obodo Agu Village Square
Nkanu East	Ihuokpara	Nkwo Market Square; Igwebuike Primary School; Ezi Obodo Village Square; C. S. Ihuokpara; Orie Market Square; C. S. S. Ihuokpara; Oganiru Primary School; Ogonwaja Village Square; Amaokoro Ndibinagu Square; Aboshi Amunakwa Square; Afuninyi Amangene Square
Nkanu East	Nara I	Community School Ndiagu Umuiba; Community Primary School Amaofia; Onufia Umuiba Village Square; Girls' Secondary School, Nara; Ihuabari Amaofia Nara; Amagu Village Square; Primary School Obeagu Umuiba; Obeagu Omogbuogba Primary School
Nkanu East	Nara II	C. P. S. Agbaraji I; Primary School Ndi Agu Ode; Ogbukachi Village Square; C. S. Isi Ogbo; Isi Ogbo Village Square; Central School Nara; Obodo Edeanyi Village Square; B. S. S. Nara; Achara Village Square; Ogonogo Ndiagu Village Square; C. P. S. Agbaraji II
Nkanu East	Nkerefi I	Njikoka Amofu; Udoka Primary School Amagu; Mbanocha Primary School Amofu; Community School Amagu; Union Primary School Umuigbo; Amofu Primary School
Nkanu East	Nkerefi II	Igwebuike Primary School Imeoha I; Comm. School Ezza Nkerefi; Primary School Emuogu I; Primary Campus II Enuogu; Comm. School Enuogu; Igwebuike Primary School Imeoha II; Imeoha Village Square
Nkanu East	Ohuani/Onicha-Agu	C./S. Aminyi; Amauzam Village Hall; C. S. Umunevo; Ndiagu Ogbo Town Hall I; C. S. I Onichagu; C. S. II Onichagu; C. S. S. Amagunze; Okeani Town Hall; Ndi Agu Ogbo Town Hall II; Amuzam Village Square; Akpaka Village Square; C. S. Onicha Agu III
Nkanu East	Ugbawka I	Ama Ukufu Primary School; Amanakweji Village Square; C. S. Amagu; C. S. Obeagu; C. S. S. Ugbawka; Obodo Ogwe Umunevo; Amankwo Primary School; C. S. Uhuome I; Ishienu Town Hall; Railway Station; Obodo Ezeoha Square Umuisu
Nkanu East	Ugbawka II	C. P. S. Amauzam I; Obdo Obodoagu Village Square; Onungeneoma Village Square; Comm. School I Isigwe; Comm. School II Isigwe; Obodo Ede Village Hall; Obodo Igweshi Village Square; Obodo Ukpocha Village Square; C. P. S. II Amuzam; C. P. S. Amafor Ugbawka II
Nkanu East	Nomeh	Donuede Primary School Amigbo Nomeh; C. P. S. Nomeh I; Primary School Nomeh; Union Town School Nomeh I; Union Town School Nomeh II; C. P. S. Nomeh II
Nkanu East	Mburubu	Central School Mbububu I; Central School Mbububu II; Central School Mbububu III; Mburubu Court Premises
Nkanu West	Agbani	Community School Mbogodo I; Community School Mbogodo II; Primary School Ogbeke I; Group School Agbani; Station Primary School Agbani I; Central School Agbani I; Nvu Amakpu Village Hall; Ukwa Village Square; Ndiagu Ogbeke Square; Ukuruta Town Hall; Primary School Ogbeke II; Ojiagu Town Hall; Station Primary School Agbani II; Community Secondary School Agbani; Allins Commercial Kschool Agbani; Central School, Agbani II; Umuonwe Village Hall Agbani; Ogwe-Ajeme Village Square Agbani; Nvu-Agu Amafor Village Square Agbani; Mgbenu Village Hall Mbogodo
Nkanu West	Amurri	Obodo Ojiri Village Square; Community Central School Eziokwe I; Community Central School Eziokwe II; Primary School Obeagu; Community Central School Umuigbo; Primary School Amankanu; Community School Amankanu; Community Primary School Enuagu; Upata Primary School I; Umuedum Village Hall; Ihungwu Village Square; Affia Nwakpata Square; Obinagu Eziokwe Village Square; Obodo Okolo Chukwu Village Square; Obodo Ide Umuagbu-Enugu Village Square; Amachara Square; Nkwo Market Square; Obodo Ojiri Village Square II
Nkanu West	Akegbe-Ugwu (Okwuo)	Community Central School Akegbe-Ugwu; Obeagu Town Hall I; Community Primary School Amigbo; Agwunato Town Hall; Girls' High School, Akegbe-Ugwu; Obeagu Town Hall II
Nkanu West	Amodu	Community School Amodu I; Community School Amodu II; Amodu Night Market Square I; Amodu Achalla Town Hall I; Union Primary School Amodu I; Union Primary School Amodu II; Enugu-Ugbuakpu Square; Achara Orie Odenigbo Square; Ihu-Uno Ani Agu Square
Nkanu West	Obuoffia	Central School Obuoffia I; Amangwu Civic Centre; Isiofor Town Hall Obuoffia; Kiheani Awkunanaw Central Hall; Umuiba Hall Obuoffia; Obuoffia Obe, Obuoffia Village Square; Iheani Awkunanaw Central Hall II; Central School Obuoffia II
Nkanu West	Obe	Community Central School I; Community Central School II; Obodo Onu Village Square I; Union Primary School; Community School Enugu Obe I; Technical Sch. Obe I; Girls' Secondary School Obe I; Union Primary School Obe II; Community School Enugu Obe II; Technical Sch. Obe II; Obodo Onu Village Square II; Ugwu Mkpume Village Square; Eziobodo Enugu Obe Village Square; Ukwudara Ihuwuako Village Square; Orie Market Village Square; Ugwu Nkpume Market Square
Nkanu West	Obinagu Uwani (Akpugo I)	Obinagu Uwani Ogirishi Village Square; Amaowelle Town Hall; Aniyi Town Hall; Community School Ameke; Amakpu Town Hall; Community Secondary School Obinagu I; Community Secondary School Obinagu II; Obinagu Uwani Ogirishi Village Square I; Comm. Sec. School Obinagu III
Nkanu West	Akpugo II	Nvuaja Village Square; Nkwo Nnajiona Amankwo Hall I; Central School, Ndiagu Obuno; Ubogu Village Square; Oketoke Village Square; Amauzam Village Square; Nkwo Nnajiona Amakwo Hall II
Nkanu West	Akpugo III	Eke Nvu Ameke Village Square; Community School Amede; Community Central School, Amede; Boys' Secondary School I; Uwani Agbede Village; Ameke Centrtal Village Square; Ndiuzu Village Hall Ihunekwagu; Community Secondary School II; Central School Deji Ndiuno, Akpugo I; Community School Ihunekwagu I; Boys' Secondary School II; Community School, Ihunekwagu II; Community Secondary School I; Central School Deji Ndiuno, Akpugo II; Ogbashi Village Square Ama-Ugo Agu Deji Uno I; Ogbashi Village Square Ama-Ugo Agu Deji Uno II
Nkanu West	Akugbo IV	Community School Deji Ndiagu I; Group School Deji Ndiagu; Community School Ugwuafor; Primary School Onuzagba; Uvuagba Town Hall I; Enugu-Agu Village Square; Uvagba Town Hall II; Onu-Akpata Village Square; Onueke Town Hall; Onuafor Aniede Village Hall; Ogonano Village Square Ogbozine I; Community School Deji Ndiagu II; Amoji Village Hall; Onichagu Village Square; Uzzam Agu Village Square; Ifeanishene Village Square; Onueko Village Onicha Agu; Obodo Aja Village Square
Nkanu West	Umueze	Ndiagu Etiti Village Square; Community School I, Umueze; Community School II, Umueze; Boys' Secondary School, Umueze I
Nkanu West	Ibite Akegbe Ugwu	Primary School Attakwu I; Primary School Attakwu II; Nkwo Onugwu Market Square; Primary School Amagu I; Ugwu Oyovo Market Square; Central School Akegbe-Ugwu I; Obodo Eneoko Village Square; Egbu Village Market Square; Comprehensive Secondary School Akpasha; Central School Akegbe-Ugwu II; Primary School Amagu II; S. S. T. Akegbe-Ugwu; Ogbo-Owo Village Square I; Ogbo-Owo Village Square II
Nkanu West	Ndiuno Uwani (Akpugo I)	Ndiuno Uwani Community School I; Amaetiti Central Village Hall; Onueke Village Square Hall; Central School Akpugo I; Central School Akpugo II; Ndiuno Uwani Comm. School II
Nsukka	Ogbozalla/Idi	Odinanso Village Hall; Primary School Idi Opi; Amnasu Village Hall; Umuolo Primary School; Umuile Village Hall; Umuezenakwa Village Hall; Primary School Ogbegbor; Etiti Village Hall; Amogbodu Village Hall; Amukpa Village Hall; Isamelu Amoke Village Hall; Umueze Amoke Village Hall; Primary School Isamele; Primary School Eke Opi; Primary School Orie Opi Agu; Ohuiyi Uja Opi Agu; Amadim Village Square; Isibegua Village Square Opi Agu; Obu Obuezi; Ibuko; Ohuiyi II; Umunta; Kpokpo; Upata Village Hall; Ibegama
Nsukka	Ibeku	Community Primary School Opi Uno (Snr); Obodo Umuezikedim; Unyasu Primary School Opi Uno; Unyasu Ibeku; Obu Umudulugwuinyi I; Obu Umudulugwuinyi II; Obodo Umuagogwu; Isi Engine Water Bore Hole; Obu Idah; Obodo Umueze; Obodo Umuegoloma; Community Primary School Nkwo Agu Opi; Umuakpu (Old Opi Junction); Obodo Ama Idenyi; Obu Ugwuda; Obu Amokenshi; Umueworo; Aho Opi
Nsukka	Alor-Uno	Otobo Ugbene Alor-Uno; Otobo Ugbene Agu; Central School Alor-Uno; Community Primary School Alor-Uno; Enugu Ugbene Alor; Otobo Onukachi
Nsukka	Ede-Ukwu	Community Secondary School Ede-Oballa; Obere Umuidu; Obere Orihe; Abakwuru Village Square; Otobo Amaegbu; Uba-Abari P/S. School; Ozare Ukwu Inyi; Otobo Elue Umukabi; Ndiagu Amaogba; Agbaenyi Umukabi; Otobo Umueze Oyima
Nsukka	Ede-Nta	Community Primary School Ede-Oballa I; Amaekwem Village Square; Otobo Amauzu; Otobo Amara; Otobo Isamenu; Obere Owerre; Akpatulu Village Square; Ndiagu Umuinyere; Community Primary School Ede -Oballa II; Umuoka Village Square; Alagba Primary School
Nsukka	Edem-Ani	Community Primary School Ugwuagbo; Central School Edem-Ani; Otobo Amogwu; Otobo Ubogidi; Otobo Owerre Ugwu; Otobo Uwani; Otobo Odojo; Otobo Umuchagwu; Community Secondary School Edem-Ani; Amaesumesu; Ndiagu Umuchagwu
Nsukka	Akpa/Ozzi	Farm School Agu Amagu I; Igoro Agbo Akpa Edem; Community Primary School Akpa Edem I; Amafor Akpa Edem; Union Primary School Akpa Edem; Union Primary School Ozzi Edem; Hill Top School Ozzi Edem I; Obinagu II
Nsukka	Agbemebe/Umabor	Community High School Umabor; Community Primary School Umuhu Umuabor; Amaemuje Village Square; Okwanyi Village Square; Owerre Umuabor; Ogwashi Village Square; State Primary School Agbamere; Union Primary School Agbamere; Umuedem Hall I; Umuedem Hall II; Otobo Odobido; Umuegbe Village Square; Otobo Ugwu Enugwu; Otobo Okwani II
Nsukka	Eha-Uno	Otobo Amundi; Community Primary School Eha-Uno; Otobo Ogboduele; Otobo Amaechielu I; Otobo Amaechielu II; Primary School Akwari I; Primary School Akwari II; Otobo Amaochime; Oboto Ukwuaji; Community Primary School II Otobo Umueze Village Square; Umuarima Village Square; Umuajima Village Square
Nsukka	Eha-Ndiagu	Community School Ehandiagu; Odobido Primary School Eha-Ndiagu; Community Secondary School Eha-Ndiagu; Amechielu Primary School Azuabor I; Amechielu Primary School Azuabor II; Community Primary School Eha Azuabor; Ise Primary School Eha-Ndiagu; Primary School Breme; Otobo Ikeagwu Breme; Primary School Amanato Eha-Ndiagu; Otobo Epio; Primary School Edem Umabor; Otobo Azuabor Uno; Ugwu Eke Village Square
Nsukka	Ibagwani/Ibagwaga Okpaligbo	Health Centre Ibagwani; Otobo Umuezikoli; Umuasadu Azumakpo; Otobo Onueze; Community Primary School Ibagwani I; Community Primary School Ibagwani II; Otobo Amigbo; Community School Okpaligbo I; Community School Okpaligbo II; Community Primary School Ibagwani III; Community Primary School Ibagwani IV; Community Primary School Obiette; Community Primary School Otobollo; Otobo Umuakpo
Nsukka	Ejuona/Uwani	Union Primary School, Lejja; Otobo Agu Ebara; Otobo Mbamonye; Otobo Amaovuku; Ugwu Dunoka; Ogbo Dunoka; Otobo Ezenobe; Otobo Umuorogbogu; Otobo Obukpa; Ugbelenabo Primary School; Otobo Umuogboji; Otobo Ugo; Owerre Uno I; Owerre Uno II; Otobo Agu Owerre; Agu Mbekwu; Otobo Ugwu Ameze
Nsukka	Akalite	Otobo Amankwo; Otobo Agu Odenigbo; Otobo Umuefi; Otobo Ishiahaba; Otobo Ishiamelu; Otobo Uga; Otobo Umuoda Ulo; Otobo Eguru Umuoda; Uwani Agu Umuoda; Otobo Umakpo Ulo; Otobo Site Umakpo; Otobo Site Umakpo Uwani; Otobo Umakpo Uwenu; Otobo Site Amelu; Otobo Uwenu Amube; Otobo Ukwuoto Amube; Otobo Agu Amegbu Amube; Otobo Umungwoke; Federal Government Girls' College; Otobo Enu Onicha
Nsukka	Mkpunano	New Obelibe Primary School; Community Primary School Nguru; Otobo Ugwu Isiakpu; Community School Isiakpu; Dotobo Isiyi Isiakpu; Amaezeani Hall; Umuakashi-Echara Joint Primary School; Otobo Umueze Umakashi; Army Barracks; Odoro Otobo Ihge; Otobo Agbani; T. T. C.; Obelibe Nguru; Otobo Obechara; Odimegwu Nguru
Nsukka	Nru	Ihe Agu Primary School; Otobo Amabo; Ndiagu Ugwuagbo; Otobo Ndiagu Edem; Otobo Amorah; Otobo Ogidi; Otobo Amadim; Otobo Amarika; Otobo Amaukpocha; Otobo Nkpurumoji I; Otobo Nkpurumoji II; Umuashi Village Square; Otobo Amaori; Ogbuagu Village Square; C. S. Nru
Nsukka	Owerre/Umuoyo	Nkwo Nsukka; Otobo Umude; Urualla Umualla; Otobo Umujiocha; Otobo Amoka; Otobo Umugorie; Otobo Umudimkwo; Otobo Umudim; Otobo Owerre Enu; Otobo Amokwe; Otobo Amozarra; Otobo Ameze; Otobo Owerre Ani I; Otobo Owerre Ani II; Township School I; Township School II; Union Primary School I; Union Primary School II; Otobo Amoli; Agbugwu Owerre Ani
Nsukka	Obimo/Ikwoka	Hill-Top School I Obimo; Hill-Top School II Obimo; Ugwuoroko Village Square; Udoka Primary School Obimo; Central School Enuagu Obimo; Community Primary School Obimo I; Community Primary School Obimo II; Owerre Village Square; Ikwoka Village Square; Ndiagu Isiugwu Village Square; Ayobachukwu Village Square; Otobo Isienu Akpotoro II; Ohe-Ugwu Ajima
Nsukka	Okpuje/Okutu/Anuka	Universal Primary Education I (U. P. E.); Universal Primary Education II (U. P. E.); Community Primary School Okpuje; Community School Okpuje; Uwenu Okpuje; Akokoro Okpuje; Community Primary School Okutu; Community School Okutu; Agbo Enugu Okutu; Community Primary School Anuka; Achara Ugwu Okpuje
Nsukka	Obukpa	Community Primary School Obukpa Ogbagu; Community Primary School Ime Okpe; Community Primary School, Amagu; Amaugwu Village Hall; Community Primary School Owerre Obukpa; Otobo Ihe Obukpa; Ihuama Village Hall; Umugwoke Village Hall; Umudiogu Village Hall; Community School Obukpa
Oji-River	Oji-River I	Central School Agbalaenyi; Community School Agbalaenyi I; Community School Agbalaenyi II
Oji-River	Oji-River II	Central School Oji River; School Of Health; Okwe Primary School
Oji-River	Oji-River III	Central School Oji River/Okwe Primary School Dodo; Savory Memorial School Oji River; Central School Oji River; Aniocha Hall, Aniocha
Oji-River	Oji-River IV	Universal Primary Education School Mile II; Ojinato Primary School
Oji-River	Ugwuoba I	Central School Ugwuoba; Joint School Ugwuoba; Oranyeaka Primary School, Ugwuoba; Agungwuogbo Village Square; Ezi Nzegwu Vill Sq; Cattle Market (Nomadic School) II
Oji-River	Ugwuoba II	Udoka Primary School, Ugwuoba; Community School Ugwuoba; Old Afor Market Square I; Old Afor Market Square II
Oji-River	Ugwuoba III	Eke Agugolo Square; Obodo Eze Square; Community School Aguobosi I; Community School Aguobosi II
Oji-River	Achiagu I	Ahani Community School; Community School Adu I; Community School Adu II; Community School Ihe; Community School Amaetiti I; Community School Amaetiti II; Federal School Ahani
Oji-River	Achiagu II	Central School Enugu Akwu I; Central School Enugu Akwu II; Ofia Na Oji Community School; Community School Akwu; Nkwo Market Square; Obodo Ukwu Square
Oji-River	Achiagu III	Obu Muelocha Village Square; Community School Umuowulu I; Community School Umuowulu II; Community School Enugu Agu; Obuekwene Public Square; Community School Umumba I; Community School Umumba II; Obu Mube Hall
Oji-River	Achiuno I	Joint School Isikwe I; Joint School Isikwe II; Central School Isikwe I; Community School Isikwe I; Community School Isikwe II; Umuakpu Hall I; Umuigwe Aja Town Hall; Central School Isikwe II; Girls' Secondary School Isikwe; Umuakpu Hall II; Alaezieke Square Hall (Umuelocha); St. Bath's Primary School Obinagu
Oji-River	Achiuno II	Upe Amankpunato; Old Local Authority School Umueze I; Isiokwe Town Hall; Community School Amankpunato I; Community School Amankpunato II; Obodoka Square; Eke Egbo Market Square; L. E. School Umueze II
Oji-River	Achiuno III	Central School Achi I; Central School Achi II; Central School Agbadala; Community Primary School Umuigwe; St. John's Primary School Agbadalla
Oji-River	Achiuno IV	Central School Egwu; Community School Egwu; Community School Ehuhe
Oji-River	Inyi I	Obibi Hall Enugu Inyi; Community School Ozegu; Community School Umu Chime; Community School Inyi I; Community School Inyi II; Community School Inyi III
Oji-River	Inyi II	Joint School Agbajiri; Premier School Alum; Central School Alum; Central School Inyi I; Central School Inyi II; Community School Nkwere I; Ngwurumani Square; Community School Nkwere II
Oji-River	Inyi III	Community School Amankwo I; Community School Amankwo II; Central School Obune; Eke Market Square Obune I; Eke Market Square Obune II
Oji-River	Inyi IV	Community School Umungu; Obu Egoro Square Umuagu; Central School Umuagu I; Central School Umuagu II; Obuude (Ndibeude) Umuobu I; Obuude (Ndibeude) Umuobu II; Obodoaki Gbaragu Square; Umuenedu Village Square Echebe
Oji-River	Awlaw	Central School Awlaw I; Central School Awlaw II; Community School Awlaw I; Community School Awlaw II; Agbadala Primary School Awlaw; Community School, Nkwuni; Nkwo Oti Okpo Umuomaka; Obunwoke Umuomaka; Obuezejinketa Square
Oji-River	Akpugoeze	Central School Akpugo Eze I; Central School Akpugo Eze II; Agbo Umudim Hall; Amagu Village Hall; Igwuebuike Primary School Akpugoeze; Ezeokwu Primary School Akpugoeze I; Ezeokwu Primary School Akpugoeze II; Community School Akpugoeze I; Community School Akpugoeze II; Community School Obinagu Akpugoeze I; Community School Obinagu Akpugoeze II; Teachers Training Collage I; Teachers Training Collage II; Ofechem Village Square I; Akpugoeze High School; Ofechem Village Square II
Udenu	Amala	Central School Amalla; Nkalagu Village Square; Agushire; Umuagali Ulo Village Square I; Igbokwubonu Village Square; Ifuruoka Primary School; Uzonkwo Village Square; Umuachi Ulo Village Square; Obuagu Umuomame; Ete Umuagale; Osondu Umuabadu Village Square; Obodo Onitsha Square; Obodo Asaba Square; Ovoko Umunachi Village Hall; Amala/Obollo Primary School; Obodo Ibagwa Village Square; Umuageli Ulo Village Square II
Udenu	Ezimo	Ozalla Uno I; Ezimo Uno Primary School; Central School Nkwor I; Central School Nkwor II; Ibagwa Ezimo Primary School I; Amaogbele Village Hall; Universal Primary School Urukpa; Ezimo Agu Primary School; Ogbuefie Village Hall; Ama-Ogbele Ezimo Village Hall; Ozalla Uno II
Udenu	Imilike	Premier Primary School Ogene; Umuakpogwu; Inland Primary School Nkpagu; Community Primary School Imilike Ani; Umuegari; Primary School Imilike Etiti; Amaogbodo Village Hall; Community Secondary School Imilike Agu I; Ugwuenwe Square Imilike Agu; Central School Imilike Agu I; Umueze Village Square; Girls' Secondary School Imilike Uno; Central School Imilike Agu II; C. S. S. Imilike Agu II
Udenu	Obollo-Afor	Amutenyi Primary School; Umuasanya Village Square; Central School Obollo Afor I; Central School Obollo Afor II; Station; Umuagere; Ohulor I; Ohulor II; Umuajimeze; Amutaenyi Primary School I Ulo; Ogbele Ohulor Village Square; Ugbebe Ogwu I; Ngbugbo/Iheakpu Village Square; Ulo/Iheakpu Village Square; Ugbabe Ulo N'Obollo; Onwukwe Iheakpu; Umuodu Village Hall; Umuezejor Village Hall; Livestock Hall, New Road; World Bank School Ogbete/Ibada; Hillside Primary School Iheakpu; Umueze Amutaenyi Village Hall; Ogwu Primary School
Udenu	Obollo-Etiti	Umuoleyi Primary School; Amagu Hall; Umuosigide Ulo Primary School; Ndiagu Umuosigide Primary School; Umuosogu Primary School; Umuitodo Primary School I; Nshiama Village Hall; Ada Peoples' School; Ohulor Etiti Village Square; Odenigbo Village Square; Uzoagu Village Hall; Amaechi Village Hall; Okpakerekere Primary School; Okpaga Village Hall; Akanugu Village Hall; Akparata Ada Village Hall; Amoda Village Square; Umuitodo Primary School II; Ezza Village Square; Agudele Village Square
Udenu	Obollo-Eke	Ugbabe Uwani I; Ugbabe Uwani II; Ogwu Uwani I; Ogwu Uwani II; Ogwu Uwani III; Odobido I; Odobido II; Nkpunato; Nkpologwu; Ngeleokpo; Umuaro; Uburu; St. Patrick College Obollo Eke; Amutaenyi Village Hall; Umuezejor Village Hall; Ohulor Village Hall; Okpaigbo Village Hall; Ezza Village Hall; Iheakpu Primary School I; Agala Village Hall; Agamede Isiewu; Isiewu; Iheakpu Primary School II; P. P. S. Odobido; Ajama Village Hall; C. S. Ogwu
Udenu	Ogbodu-Aba	Ugwuagba Village Square I; Community Secondary School Obodu-Aba I; Ikegwu Primary School; Agushire Village Square; Amagunze Village Square; Onitsha Village Hall; Ulo N'Obodu Village Hall; Community Secondary School Ogbodu-Aba II; Egu Primary School; Ugwuagba Village Square II
Udenu	Orba I	Umugwu Village Square; Owerre Ani; Umuokpara I; Umuokpara II; Nkpunato; Owere Elu; Amaukwu I; Amaukwu II; Umuagariga I; Umuagariga II; Umuoworogu; Obigbo I; Obigbo II
Udenu	Orba II	Okpu Village Square I; Amaogbu Village Square; Owerre Okpu Village Square I; Owerre Okpu Village Square II; Ohebe Primary School; Aguoba Primary School I; Amube I; Amube II; Amalla Primary School; Amube Amalla I; Amube Amalla II; Amadim Ohom; Umudiala Village Hall; Amaoba Town Hall; Aguoba Primary School II; Umunkpume; Amaikune; Buru Amaenyi; Okpu Village Square II; Agudele Primary School; Amajioka Village Hall; Amedem Primary School
Udenu	Udunedem	Amachara Village Square I; Umuemerie Village Square; Ifuma Village Square; Inland Primary School Campus I; Inland Primary School Scampus II; Umuokere; Amaolu; Amachara Village Square II; Amachara Village Square III
Udi	Udi/Agbudu	P. P. S. Udi I; P. P. S. Udi II; Ekenene Hall Udi I; Ekenene Hall Udi II; Hill Side Primary School; Community Primary School Agbudu I; Amabor Town Hall Agbudu; Community Primary School Agbudu II; Abalu Square
Udi	Nsude	Amuyi Hall; Community Primary School Nsude; Central School Nsude; Umuaka Village Hall I; Okpuno Village Hall; Ugwuto Village Square; Amagu Village Square; Okpuno Village Square; Umuaka Village Hall II
Udi	Umuaga	Umuamon Hall I; Umuamon Hall II; Community Primary School Umuaga; Central School Umuaga; Alum Hall I; Alum Hall II; Alum Hall III
Udi	Umuabi	Premier Primary School Umuabi; Community Primary School Enugu Umuabi; Central School Umuabi; Community Primary School Abaugulu Umuabi; Community Primary School Abaozo
Udi	Nachi	Obodo Nweke Square I; Obodo Nweke Square II; Central School Obinagu Nachi; Community Primary School Umubo Nachi I; Community Primary School Umubo Nachi II; Obodo Ikwe Hall I; Community Primary School Nachi III; Community Primary School Nachi IV; Obodo Ikwe Hall II
Udi	Ngwo Asa	Comm P/S Enugu Ngwo; Silas Memorial Primary School Etiti; Ekeani Hall I; Ekeani Hall II; Ekeani Hall III; Ekeani Hall IV; Community Primary School Amachalla Ngwo I; Community Primary School Amachalla Ngwo II; Afia Ogwe Okwojo I; Afia Ogwe Okwojo II; Amabor Primary School; Umuase Primary School II; Etiti Hall Ngwo; Central School Ngwo; Primary Schl. Okwojo Ngwo; Ukaka Village Hall; Ukwu Okpebe Village Square; Umuode Village Hall; Silas Memorial Nursery School Ngwo
Udi	Ngwo Uno	Oluama Primary School; Ukwuachi Village Hall; Etiti Village Hall I; Etiti Village Hall II; Okwe Village Square; Eke Odido Town Hall; Akama Village Hall I; Akama Village Hall II; Eke Ameke Square I; Eke Ameke Square II; Ibute Nursery School; 9th Mile Main Market I; 9th Mile Main Market II; Luxury Motor Park; Hausa Quarters; Eke Ameke Hall; Community Primary School Ameke; Okwe Amankwo Hall; 9th Mile Saloon/Bus Park; Okwe Village Hall; Ukwuachi Hall; Umuozoenwu Square
Udi	Ebe	Amagu Village Hall I; Nkwo Ebe Hall I; Nkwo Ebe Hall II; Eziama Village Hall; Central School Ebe I; Central School Ebe II; Omadi Village Hall I; Omadi Village Hall II; Amagu Village Hall II
Udi	Awhum/Ukana	Community Primary School Awhum; Community Secondary School Ukana; Community Primary School Uzu Ukana I; Near St. Luke's Church Awhum; Community Primary School Uzu Ukana II; Obodo Okpa Primary School Awhum; C. P. S. Uzu Ukana III
Udi	Egede/Umuoka	Egede Square I; Egede Square II; Obionueze Meyiwo I; Obionueze Meyiwo II; Community Primary School Umuovu; Umuanum Hall; Okwum Hall; Community Primary School Umuoka; Nkwo Market Square; Umuoka P/S Ikenga I; Umuoka P/S Ikenga II; Zodiac Market Square; Umuokpala Hall Egede
Udi	Akpa Kwume/Nze	Umudiekwem Hall I; Umudiekwem Hall II; Umugwu Hall I; Amutu Town Hall I; Community Primary School Nze I; Community Primary School Nze II; Amutu Town Hall II
Udi	Affa/Oghu/Ikono	Community Primary School, Amachalla; Central School Amokwu I; Obodo Agba Square; Ikedimkpa Health Centre I; Ikedimkpa Health Centre II; Universal Primary School Umukoloma; Primary School, Ezeugama; Central School Amofia/Imezi; Nkwo Amofia; Central School Amokwu II; Central School Obinagu Affa; Oghu Village Square; Ikono Village Square; P. S. Ezeugama; Amaube Quarters Amokwu; Onu-Odo Emene
Udi	Abor	Afor Ofufe Abor; Onuani Eguma; Maternity Square Abor I; Maternity Square Abor II; Afor Ofufe; Community Primary School Abor; Orie Abor Mkt. Square I; Onuani Eguma I; Onuani Eguma II; Orie Abor Mkt. Square II
Udi	Okpatu	Central School Ikeghe; Obinagu Hall Okpatu I; Ezeama Hall I; Ezeama Hall II; Umuchime Hall; Primary School Amachalla I; Obinagu Hall Okpatu II; Primary School Amachalla II; C. P. S. Mbaraugwu; Amaukwu Hall
Udi	Obioma	Umunugwo Hall I; Umunugwo Hall II; Ameke Hall I; Ameke Hall II; Umuoka Hall
Udi	Umulumgbe	Community Primary School Lett/Akpani I; Community Primary School Lett/Akpani II; Central School Uwenu/Amachalla I; Central School Uwenu/Amachalla II; Community Primary School Edem I; Amauwenu Civic Hall; Community Primary School White Campus I; Community Primary School White Campus II; C. P. S. Edem II
Udi	Amokwe	St. Mathias School Amokwe; St. Mary's School Ededu I; St. Mary's School Ededu II; St. Paul's School Ibuzor I; St. Anthony's Orji; St. Teresa's Uwani I; St. Teresa's Uwani II; National Pri. Schl. Amokwe I; National Pri. Schl. Amokwe II; Achiekpu Square; Olie Uwani; Comm. Sec. Schl. Amokwe I; Obodo Onicha; St. Paul's School Ibuzor II; Nkpuluani Hall; Obodo Umuoma Hall; Comm. Sec. Schl. Amokwe II
Uzo-Uwani	Igga/Asaba	Community Primary School Igga I; Community Primary School Igga II; Central School Asaba I; C. S. Asaba II
Uzo-Uwani	Adaba-Nkume	Community Primary School Aniocha I; Community Primary School Aniocha II; Amaogbo Orie Adaba I; Amaogbo Orie Adaba II; Old Nkwo Market Square I; Old Nkwo Market Square II; New Market Amaokwe; Community Primary School Nkume I; Community Primary School Nkume II
Uzo-Uwani	Umulokpa	Nkwelle Town Hall I; Nkwelle Town Hall II; Union Primary School Umulokpa I; Union Primary School Umulokpa II; Central School Umulokpa I; Central School Umulokpa II; Community Primary School Ogbosu; Town Hall Umuakor; Amulu Village Square; Community Primary School Awkunitor; E. P. S. Eziora I; E. P. S. Eziora II; Ogbosu Town Hall; Central School Umulokpa III; Ogbosu Town Hall II; U. P. S. Umulokpa IV
Uzo-Uwani	Ukpata	Umudingwu Village Square; Amufia Village Square I; Umueze Anukwulu Square I; Achala Oda Square I; Amufia Village Square II; Umueze Anukwulu Square II; Achala Oda Square II
Uzo-Uwani	Ojo	Umuasaba Village Square I; Ojjor Village Square; Umuasaba Village Square II; Ojjor Village Square II
Uzo-Uwani	Adani	Central School Adani I; Central School Adani II; Eziama Village Square I; Eziama Village Square II; Akutara Village Square; Ajona Village Square; P. P. S. Adani; Health Centre I; Health Centre II; O. P. S. Adani; Farm Settlement Adani; Aniocha Village Square I; Aniocha Village Square II; Orie Adani Market Square I; Orie Adani Market Square II; Otobo Amauvuru Uwenu
Uzo-Uwani	Ogurugu	Ogurugu Garrage; Community Primary School Ogurugu I; Onoja P/S Ogurugu; Ugbamaja Primary School; Community Primary School Ogurugu II; Ukpali Village Square; Okpoto Village Square
Uzo-Uwani	Abbi	Community Primary School Abbi I; Ejona Ogba Village Square; Isiyi Village Square; Nkwo-Ugwuobi Uwenuokpe; Apapam Village Square; Amanyi Village Square; Otobo-Uba Village Square; Primary School Oruku; Community Primary School Abbi II; Nkwor-Ugwuobi Uwenuokpe
Uzo-Uwani	Akpogu	Community Primary School Akpugo I; Otobo-Ufu Village Square; C. P. S. Akpugo II
Uzo-Uwani	Uvuru	Ogwu Uvuru; Uwani Mgboko I; Uvuru Ani Village Square; Uwani - Umuinama; Ugbene-Uvuru; Community Primary School Uvuru; Uwani Mgboko II
Uzo-Uwani	Nimbo I	Ukpabi Nimbo Court I; Community Primary School Opanda; Ugwuijoro Village Square; Onu Ofu Owere; Akpamanya Village Square; Ukpabi Nimbo Court II; Onu-Ofu Vill. Square II; Jide Break
Uzo-Uwani	Nimbo II	Onu Ofu Ebor Square; Community Primary School Nimbo; Enugu Nimbo Onu Ofu; Unasi/Isiyereji; Amaogbo Village Square; Ekwulu Village Square; Otobo Akaha I; Otobo Akaha II
Uzo-Uwani	Ugbene I	Isiama Village Square; Uwenu Onyisi Square; Amanyi Amaogidi; Amaisieke Ugwu Square I; C. S. Ugbene-Ajima; Amaisieke Ugwu Square II
Uzo-Uwani	Ugbene II	Ashenyi Village Square; Enugu-Ada Village Square; Umukpaka Village Square; Community Primary School Ugbene-Ajima; Ifuraomchi Village Square; O. P. S. Ugbene-Ajima I; Orba Village Square; O. P. S. Ugbene-Ajima II
Uzo-Uwani	Nrobo	Central School Nrobo I; Community Primary School Nrobo; Community Primary School Ajayigo (Olipara); Umuiya Village Square; C. S. Nrobo II
Uzo-Uwani	Nkpologu	H. T. P. S. Nkpologu I; Community Primary School Nkpologu I; Community Primary School Nkpunator; Central School Nkpologu I; Central School Nkpologu II; Adada Secondary School Nkpologu; H. T. P. S. Nkpologu II; C. P. S. Nkpologu II
