= Uvuru-Agada =

- Location in Nigeria
- Coordinates: 6°41′44″N 7°10′52″E
- Country: Nigeria
- State: Enugu State
- LGA: Uzo Uwani

Government
  - Igwe: HRH Igwe Engr Ositadinma IDu (Agada of Agada)

Area
  - Total: 1,355 km^{2} (523 sq mi)
- Elevation: 252 m (827 ft)

Population (2006 census)
  - Total: 155,340
  - Density: 114.6/km^{2} (296.9/sq mi)
- Time zone: UTC+1 (WAT)
- Zip: 411121

// Uvuru-Agada Ancient Kingdom is a community in Uzo Uwani, Enugu State, Nigeria. It is roughly 31 kilometres (19 mi) from Nsukka. The community is commonly called Uvuru-Agada Ancient Kingdom after Agada, the community's founder. The community is led by Igwe in council, Uvuru improvement union (UIU) and a committee of the olders from some chosen clans from different villages known as Ndi-Idi-Uvuru, which is responsible for administering justice and resolving disputes.

== Constituent villages ==
Uvuru-Agada consists of ten villages.Note: Uvuru people don't say that Uvuru is made up of ten villages, rather Uvuru is of nine villages.Ogvu made it ten.It is because Ọgwụ was a kingdom of its own. before its people decided to amalgate into Uvuru.The villages are -

- Amono
- Inama
- Ogwu
- Okasibi
- Ugbene
- Umudia
- Umuntu
- Utokpu
- Utomaka
- Uvuru-ayi

== History ==
Uvuru's views on the origin and migration of its people are different from that of its neighbors. One version talks about Igala influence, while another version points to Eri-Nri influence. Another claim was that Eri-Nri influences in the area were outweighed by the influence of Attah of Igala as in many other localities within the Nsukka area.

== Economy ==
Uvuru's economy depends on locally produced agricultural tools, including hoes (ogu), machetes (mma), axes, baskets and others. The most common staple crops are yam (multiple species), cassava, black beans, cocoyam (multiple species) and maize, among others. They also engage in artistic works such as craft sand, blacksmithing, carving, basket making, weaving and others. In addition, they cultivate fruit trees including oranges, plantain, banana, pawpaw and tangerine. Timber harvesting is another economic activity, owing to the rainforest trees in the farms.

== Culture ==
The traditional religion of the area is henotheistic, with Chukwu Abiama as the highest deity. Chukwu Abiama is worshipped through lesser gods in their shrines. Inhabitants attached most of their socio-cultural, political and economic activities to their traditional African religion until the arrival of Christianity in 1910.

== Education ==
The community has one government secondary school: Uvuru Secondary School and four government primary schools: Uvuru community primary school, Ogvu primary school, Uvuru-ani primary school and Okasibi-umuawa primary school.
