= Akiyi =

- Autonomous Town
- Location in Nigeria
- Coordinates: 6°30′22″N 7°06′01″E
- Country: Nigeria
- State: Enugu State
- LGA: Uzo-Uwani
- Time zone: UTC+1 (WAT)
- Postal code: 411111
- Climate: Aw

Akiyi is an autonomous community in Umulokpa, Uzo-Uwani Local Government Area (LGA), Enugu State, Nigeria. It has Seven (7) villages namely: Enugwu, Enugwu-Uwani, Imama, Nkwelle, Ukpali, Uwani and Uwenu.

== Religion ==
Christianity, Odinana and neutralist.

== Church ==
The churches in Akiyi are namely:

- Holy Cross Parish (Catholic)
- St. Stephen's Church (Anglican)
- Deeper Life Bible Church (Pentecostal)
- Watchman Catholic Charismatic Renewal Movement (Pentecostal)
- The Lord's Chosen Charismatic Movement (Pentecostal)etc.

== Culture ==
Akiyi shares cultural traits with its neighbouring communities which are consistent with general Igbo culture. Other festivals include; the New yam festival, the Amaji festival and the Ibone (Mmanwu) festival which is held between July and September of every year. The Royal Highness of Akiyi-Umulokpa is Chief Engr. Vincent I.A. Ekwedigwe; The Igwe Ijagwo.

== Age grade system ==
Akiyi practices Republican method of governance in which power is devolved to age grades. Each age grade consists of people within three years age bracket.

== Notable people ==
- Hon. Cornell Chijioke Onwubuya (Agunkwo Igbo); Politician, Administrator, former Executive Chairman, Uzo-Uwani LGA, former SSA to former Governor Sullivan Chime on Investment Promotion and, a former Commissioner under the Executive Governor of Enugu state, Rt. Hon. Ifeanyi Ugwuanyi (Gburugburu). And, SSA on Special Duties to Executive Governor, Ifeanyi Lawrence Ugwuanyi of Enugu State.
- Hon. Charles Anumudu; Educationist, Researcher, PhD Economist
- Oliver A. Odenigbo; Lecturer Dept. of Estate Management, (I.M.T) Enugu
- Udemezue Sylverster; Legal Practitioner & Lecturer at Nigerian Law School, Lagos
- Nwabueze Darlington C.; Economist/International Trade analyst and, a Chinese language instructor/translator
