= Ogui =

Autonomous Community in Enugu State Nigeria

Ogui is an autonomous community in Nike, in the Enugu North Local Government Area of Enugu State in the southeastern geopolitical zone of Nigeria. It comprises Umunevo Village, Ihewuzi Village and Onuato Village.

Ogui Nike , as it is usually called, is a major landlord to the administrative, political and economic hub of the city of Enugu, in that major public and private institutions, shopping malls, hotels, parks, banks and so on are situated on Ogui land.

== Notable people ==
Notable people in Ogui Nike include:

- Hon. Gabriel Agbo – former member House of Representatives (representing Enugu North and South constituencies)
- Hon. Barrister Emeka Nnamani – former member House of Assembly Enugu State; former transition chairman Enugu North LGA
- Hon. Philip Nnamani – former member House of Assembly Enugu State
- Hon. Chuka Ayogu – former commissioner for science & technology Enugu State
- Hon. Mrs. Patricia Alum – former commissioner for science & technology Enugu State
- Hon. Dr. Sam Ngwu – former commissioner for health Enugu State
- Hon. Barr. Emeka Geoffrey Ede – former commissioner for agriculture under the executive governor of Enugu State, Rt. Hon. Ifeanyi Ugwuanyi (Gburugburu); founder of Rhoda African Youth Global Initiative (a non-governmental organisation); member (representing Enugu East Zone) of the Governing Board of the Enugu State Agency for Universal Health Coverage (ENSA-UHC) inaugurated by His Excellency Gov. Ifeanyi Ugwuanyi; former electoral commissioner; former deputy chairman of Enugu North LGA; former elected executive chairman of Enugu North LGA; has served as a party national delegate of the PDP (Peoples Democratic Party)
- Hon. Friday Okeke Ugwu – former transition chairman Enugu North LGA
- Hon. Chief Emma Ngwu – former transition chairman Enugu North LGA; former elected executive chairman Enugu North LGA
- Hon. Ejike Ugwu – former transition chairman Enugu North LGA
- Hon. Emeka Onunze – elected executive chairman of Enugu North LGA under His Excellency Rt. Hon. Ifeanyi Ugwuanyi, the executive governor of Enugu State

== Culture ==
The culture of the Ogui people is equivalent to that of neighbouring communities. Major ceremonies and festivals include:

- New Yam Festival
- Masquerade Festival
- Igede (funeral rituals)
- Igwe Coronation Ceremony/festival
- Traditional Marriage Ceremonies
- End of the year meetings/feast

== Government ==
Ogui practices the monarchical system of government where there is an Igwe who rules over the community, followed by elders and chiefs as well as other titled individuals and groups. In Ogui, governance takes root from the family extending into lineages, the villages and the general assembly. In the general assembly, the Igwe and the elders and chiefs occupy the hierarchy in the community leadership and followed by other groups responsible for enforcement of community laws. Notable groups include Ogui Town Union, Otu Ugobueze (women's group), Otu Ogbo (age groups), etc.

== Infrastructure ==
Ogui has a functional road system, adequate sources of water and street lights. There are well-equipped and functional health centres. Notable amongst them are the Asata Health Centre and the Ogui Nike Health Centre. Located in the heart of the town is the Afia Nine Square, used as a venue for ceremonies, recreational and festival activities.

== Economy ==
The growth of the Ogui economy is facilitated by its people who have various livelihoods that cut across both formal and informal occupations. The economy is also enhanced by the presence of a number of public and private entities situated in Ogui.

== Notable places and institutions ==
- Michael Okpara Square – official venue for government functions, recreational activities as well as social and cultural activities
- Enugu State Government House – otherwise known as the Lion Building
- Enugu State House of Assembly
- Federal Government Secretariat
- UNICEF Field Office
- Enugu State High Court
- Enugu State Court of Appeal
- Federal High Court
- Nnamdi Azikiwe Stadium
- National Museum of Unity
- Zonal Headquarters of the Nigerian Television Authority
- Federal Character Commission Enugu
- Federal Ministry of Employment, Labour and Productivity
- Federal Ministry of Agriculture and Rural Development
- Federal Ministry of Health
- Federal Ministry of Environment
- Department of State Security (DSS) Enugu Headquarters
- National Archives of Nigeria
- Nigerian Export Promotion Council South East Regional Office
  - Nigeria Deposit Insurance Corporation (NDIC) Zonal Office
- Bank of Industry Enugu Regional Office
- Economic and Financial Crimes Commission (EFCC) Enugu State Zonal Office
- Enugu International Conference Centre
- West African Examinations Council( WAEC) Enugu Zonal Office
- SPAR Shopping Mall
- National Orthopaedic Hospital
- Federal Government College Enugu
- University of Nigeria Nsukka Enugu Campus Branch
- Institute of Management and Technology (IMT) Enugu Campus
- Enugu State University of Science and Technology (ESUT)

== Market places ==
Ogui is the home of the biggest market in Enugu State, New Haven Market, Old Artisan Market, New Artisan Market, Afia Nine Market are also in Ogui.

== Places of worship ==
- Christ Ascension Church Ogui
- Church of Transfiguration of our Lord Ihewuzi
- Dunamis International Gospel Centre
- Ebenezer Anglican Church
- Holy Ghost Cathedral
- St. Faith Anglican Church
- St. Luke Anglican Church Ogui
