= Umulokpa =

- Town
- Location in Nigeria
- Coordinates: 6°30′22″N 7°06′01″E
- Country: Nigeria
- State: Enugu State
- L.G.A: Uzo-Uwani

Government
  - Local Government Chairman: Chijioke Ezugwu
- Time zone: UTC+1 (WAT)
- Postal code: 411111
- Climate: Aw

Umulokpa is a town in Enugu State, Nigeria. It serves as the headquarters of Uzo-Uwani Local Government Area (L.G.A) in Enugu State, and has a population of over 150,000.

== Description and geography ==
Umulokpa is made up of four (4) quarters, and each of the quarters has villages. These quarters and villages are listed in alphabetical order. Namely:

- Akiyi: Enugwu, Enugwu-uwani, Imama, Nkwelle, Ukpali, Uwani, and Uwenu.
- Amagu: (Obinagu and Obin'uno), Umuchime, Umuaneke, Umuidi, and Umuokede.
- Eziora: Amofu, Amulu, Ukpatu, and Umuezeugwu.
- Ogbosu: Obodoukwu (formerly Odida), Umueze (formerly Mgbugbo), Umunaji, Umunaogene, Umuomasi (Umuoma), etc.

The Town is bordered by Umumbo in the north, Umerum in the west, both in (Ayamelum) LGA and Awba Ofemmili also in the west (Awka North) LGA all in Anambra State, Nigeria, Adaba and Nkume in the east (Uzo-Uwani) LGA, and Olo town in the south (Ezeagu) LGA of Enugu State, Nigeria.

Umulokpa town is predominantly rural and agrarian. The town has rich agricultural lands as a result of its location within the tropical rainforest and savannah belt; Over 85% of the population are farmers growing food crops such as rice, cassava, maize, yam, black bean, banana, plantain, etc. and a variety of fruits and vegetables. Cash crops grown include oil palm, pineapple, cashew, orange, mangoes and irvingia gabonensis (ogbono), they are also produced in large quantities. Excellent climatic conditions exist for poultry, piggery, goat, sheep and other livestock productions. The major market in Umulokpa is the "Eke Akiyi" Market. Various farm products are traded in the market on wholesale and retail basis every four days. Many of the people take their farm produce to sell in the market in exchange for other commodities they cannot produce. People from the neighbouring towns including Onitsha and Enugu urban also patronize the traders in this market especially for cassava flakes (garri), palm oil, plantain and vegetables.

== Brief history ==
Umulokpa became the headquarters of Uzo-Uwani Rural District Council (RDC) also known as "County Council" in 1951. At the end of the Nigerian Civil War in 1970, the East Central State government embarked on the re-organization of the local government system in the area. The outcome was the introduction of a local government system known as the Divisional Administration Department (DAD), which was a fusion of divisional administration and government field administration. The state was carved into 35 divisions and 640 community councils. The system sought to integrate indigenous social community organizations into the state administrative framework. In 1976, Local Government Reform which coincided with the creation of new states in which Nigeria was divided into nineteen states, Umulokpa remained the Headquarters of Uzo-Uwani LGA as Nigeria's primary objective of the reform programme was to update the existing local government structure and to bring it in line with what was obtainable elsewhere, as well as to bring about uniformity in the country’s local government administration under the then first Military Governor of old Anambra state Lieutenant Colonel John Atom Kpera and military head of state for Nigeria General Olusegun Obasanjo at the time Anambra State was created from the old East Central State of Nigeria. The town is called a food basket due to its agrarian nature. Umulokpa is closely related to Olo.

== Religion ==
Prior to the coming of Europeans, Umulokpa people practiced traditional religion with the worship of various deities like other Igbo people. However, they had since embraced Christianity over a century ago. Today, there are more than 90% Christians in the town. The major Christian faiths are the Catholic Church, also known as the Roman Catholic Church, which its current church building in Akiyi, Umulokpa is built in 1923 and the Church Mission Society (CMS), formerly known as the Church Missionary Society or called the Anglican denominations. Some other churches, especially of the Pentecostal faith, have emerged in Umulokpa in the past fifty years.
