= Abbi, Uzo-Uwani =

- LGA and town
- Interactive map of Abbi, Uzo-Uwani
- Country: Nigeria
- State: Enugu State
- Local Government Area: Uzo-Uwani

Government
- Time zone: UTC+1 (WAT)
- Postal code: 411125
- Area code: 001

Abbi is a town in Uzo-Uwani Local Government Area of Enugu State, Nigeria. It is an ancient traditional town historically comprising three main communities – Ezikolo, Ejona, and Uwani, with a total of upwards of 60 villages. The villages are spread across the communities in the valleys, upland areas and at farm settlements called "Ogbo".

Ezikolo Abbi has since been recognized by Enugu state government as an autonomous community of its own and includes the villages of Anagoro, Ibeku, Isiama, Umavuruma, Ama-ebo, Apapam, Amanyi; and Ama-eze, Umuagada and Ifuagbo, three of which territory is also called Owerre community. The other settlements of Ezikolo are found at Igbudi, Nwaedor, Oda-Ogbo, Ugwu-Ogazi, Achokonya, Amirowa, Ujobo and Abiamdu where Ezikolo shares borders with Anuka, Okpuje and Edem-Egu.

Ejona Abbi is the largest of the three communities and contains Enugu-Abbi, Umunye, Umunocha, Bebe, Nnuzu, Ala-echara, Ugwuogbada, Ikwoka, Uwenu-okpe, Ama-ngwu, Eziugwuobi, Owereeze, Ama-ugwu and other farm settlements. These are subdivided into Ejona Oda – villages in the valley plain, Ejona Ugwu for those on hill top and Ejona Ogbo for the many villages across farm settlements. Uwani Abbi has three wards – Alaozara:- Isiyi, Enwerike, U'ba villages. Edem-Eke & Ekaibite:- Ama-eke, Ama-oba, Umuoka, Umushere and other farm settlements like Orukwu etc.

== History & Origin ==
Abbi is said to be Abbi Ugweke Ugwunye. Another appellation of the beautiful ancient kingdom is Abbi Ite-ata Oshimiri. All of this pointed to its greatness - Abbi is a populous land, accommodating Ugweke and Ugwunye. Origin states that the ancient kingdom allowed a free inflow of nomadic hunters some of which settled into villages while others continued to move until there was a halt order in the mid 1600 AD. From that point Abbi was known as “Abbi nari-okooro” – meaning that Abbi people do not migrate and this policy impacted so much on the culture, such that Abbi referred to peoples of other cultures as nde Igbo as if Abbi is not Igbo and early culture viewed intermarriage with such people disdainfully. Despite the number that left the land earlier, its population remained enormous - ite-ata oshimiri. Yes, no sea gets dried up by mere fetching of water from it with pots. Certainly, Abbi regarded its people as prime stock of the human race, similar to Aryans, however, origin is not sure when human activity began in Abbi but has good information on the number of Villages of Abbi and some insightful proofs of its primordial existence and effort is work in progress on the link between Abbi Ite-ata Oshimiri and other Abbis in Delta and Cross River States of Nigeria.

Abbi, an ancient settlement town of Uzo-Uwani, was originally made up of three communities: Ezikolo, Ejona, and Uwani. Administrative structures were used to manage the communities and relations with neighboring towns. Abbi is located in a valley with springs, hills, and vegetation. Prior to the civil war, 14 villages were located on the northern hills, which have flat tops, springs, and access to farmlands bordering Kogi state and the Obinagu villages of Okpuje and Edem. Anuka, currently an autonomous community outside Uzo-Uwani LGA, was previously part of Abbi. At that time, 19 villages were located on the valley plain, totaling 33 villages in Abbi. Subsequently, Ugwuono ceased to exist, Umavuruma merged with Ama-ebo, Enwerike became a single village, and Anuka became an autonomous community.

== Invasion ==
There was an attack on Ejuona-Ogbo Village, a part of the Abbi community, in early February 2016. Two residents (Mr Fidelis Okeja and her immediate sister, Mrs Mercy Okeja) were killed and 19 persons were declared missing, with seven houses and motorcycles being razed by Fulani herdsmen.
