= Nomeh Unateze =

Nomeh Unateze (Nomeh Unateze is a town in Nkanu-East local government area of Enugu state.

This ancient town (Nomeh Unateze) has a population of about ten thousand Indigenes and is bordered on the North by Ugbawka, on the east by Mburubu, Oduma on the south and Nenwe on the west with their main language being the Igbo language.

== History of Nomeh Unateze ( OFFICIAL) ==
According to local legend, the origin of Nomeh Unateze traces back to a hunter named Unateze, who hailed from Ogugu-Eze in what is now Awgu Local Government Area, Enugu State, Nigeria.

Unateze had two sons: Nomeh and Nara

These sons went on to establish their own communities, which were named after them, Nomeh Unateze and Nara Unateze, respectively. Due to their shared lineage, the towns of Nomeh and Nara share a common ancestry and exhibit many striking cultural similarities, such as language, traditional festivals, and social systems.

== Villages of Nomeh Unateze ==
Nomeh Unateze is made up of four major villages which are

1) Uhuafor Echichi Mkpumafor

2) Amigbo Alumangu

3: Imama Mkpumonuha Eze Ugama Anebu

3) Amukabi NgeneamaOdudu

Each of these villages plays a vital role in the cultural and administrative life of the town. Collectively, they reflect the unity, heritage, and traditions passed down from their common ancestor,

== Market days ==
Nomeh Unataeze practices the four market day cycle Eke, Orie, Afor and Nkwo with Eke being the town market day.

The Eke market day is significant in Nomeh Unataeze because it is a day that both buyers and sellers of different wares from within and from neighbouring towns go to the market place to carry out various commercial activities.

Also on the Eke market day, people from far away Aba, Ph, and other regions come to purchase high quality palm oil, rice, Garri, vegetables and other agricultural products in large quantities for resale in their respective locations.

== Geography ==
Nvuna River snakes through all the villages of Nomeh, providing drinking water as well as an aquatic environment that supports an all year round farming though irrigation.

Apart from drinking water and agricultural advantage of the Nvuna River, there is also a large deposit of sharp sand and plaster sand in the riverfor building projects which has served as a means of livelihood for the people and has also created employment for those in neighbouring town.

== Religion ==
Nomeh Unataeze is predominantly Christian and has produced quite a number of clergy (Rev fathers, Rev sisters and pastors).

== See also ==
- Populated places in Enugu State
