= Agu Amede =

Village in Nigeria

- Interactive map of Agu Amede
- Coordinates: 6°42′58.889″N 7°45′10.055″E
- Country: Nigeria

Agu Amede is a village located in Nigeria. It is inhabited by members of the Eha Amufu community, Isi-uzo local government area of Enugu State.
