= Oruku =

Nigerian Community

Coordinates: 6°26′N 7°39′E

Oruku is a community in Enugu State, Nigeria.

== Government ==
The local government is Nkanu East LGA of Enugu State.

== Demographics ==
=== Language ===
The de facto language is the language of the Ibo tribe.

=== Population ===
Oruku's population, according to the 2006 census, is 12,569
