= Uzo Uwani =

Local Government Area in Enugu State, Nigeria

- LGA
- Interactive map of Uzo Uwani
- Location in Nigeria
- Coordinates: 6°45′N 7°12′E
- Country: Nigeria
- State: Enugu State
- Headquarter: Umulokpa

Government
  - Local Government Chairman: Celestine Chukwudi Nnadozie (PDP)

Area
  - Total: 855 km^{2} (330 sq mi)

Population (2006 census)
  - Total: 124,480
  - Density: 146/km^{2} (377/sq mi)
- Time zone: UTC+1 (WAT)
- 3-digit postal code prefix: 411
- ISO 3166 code: NG.EN.UU

Uzo-Uwani is a Local Government Area of Enugu State, Nigeria bordering Kogi State and Anambra State. Its headquarters is in the town of Umulokpa. It has an area of 855 km^{2} and a population of 124,480 at the 2006 census. The postal code of the area is 411.

== Invasion ==
Uzo-Uwani experienced bloody terrorist attack on April 25, 2016, in the Nimbo area. Seven Nimbo villages- Ekwuru, Ngwoko, Ugwuijoro, Ebor, Enugu-Nimbo, Umuome and Ugwuachara were invaded, and scores massacred by over 500 heavily armed Fulani herdsmen, rated the fourth deadliest terror group in the world, in the early hours of April 25, 2016. During the raid, the community's Roman Catholic church was also burnt.

According to Enugu State governor, Ifeanyi Ugwuanyi, the terrorism in Nimbo may have happened due to the inability of security agencies to successfully act on the counter intelligence report about herdsmen grouping in neighbouring Odolu in Kogi State in preparation for attack. The attack on Nimbo followed a similar attack on Abbi, another Uzo-Uwani community, where a brother and sister, Fidelis and Mercy Okeja, were reportedly killed instantly, and 19 persons declared missing whilst seven houses and motorcycles were razed down, earlier in February 2016.

== Economy and Geography ==
The trading sector in Uzo-Uwani Local Government Area's is thriving, and the area is home to several marketplaces that draw hundreds of buyers and sellers, like the Adani and Eke Akiyi rice markets. Uzo-Uwani Local Government Area's economy also heavily depends on farming, with the region producing vegetables,[maize, cocoyam, cassava, and yams. The residents of Uzo-uwani Local Government Area's also engage in hunting, animal rearing, and palm wine tapping among their other jobs.

With an average temperature of 28 degrees Celsius (82 degrees Fahrenheit), Uzo-uwani Local Government Area's is 855 square kilometres (330 square miles) in size. The Local Government Area's is home to numerous hills and rivers as well as streams. In Uzo-uwani Local Government Area, the average wind speed is estimated to be 10 km/h (6.2 mph).
