= Mmamu River =

River of Nigeria

Location
- Country: Nigeria

Physical characteristics
- Source
  - location: Mmaku

Mmamu River is a river which has its source in Mmaku community, in Awgu LGA with a large expanse at Inyi, Oji River LGA, Enugu State.
