= Anayo Onwuegbu =

Nigerian politician

Federal Representative
- Preceded by: Toby Okechukwu
- Constituency: Aninri/Awgu/Oji River

Personal details
- Occupation: Politician

Anayo Onwuegbu is a Nigerian politician. He is a member of the house of representative currently representing the Aninri/Awgu/Oji River Federal Constituency of Enugu State in the 10th National Assembly. He succeeded Toby Okechukwu.
