= Ugbo (disambiguation) =

Ugbo is a town in Ugbo. Ugbo may also refer to:

== People ==
- Emmanuel Ugbo (born 2003), Nigerian-Dutch basketball player
- Iké Ugbo (born 1998), Nigerian soccer player

== Other uses ==
- Ugbo Kingdom, kingdom in Nigeria
- Oyibo ugbo, village in Nigeria
- Onicha-Ugbo, village in Nigeria
