= Achi, Enugu State =

Town in Enugu, Nigeria

Coordinates: 6.1221°N 7.3609°E

Achi is a town in Oji River Local Government Area in Enugu State, in southeastern Nigeria.

== Geography ==
Achi is the largest town in Oji River, a Local Government Area of Enugu State. Achi town is made up of 12 villages - "isii na ulo, isii na agu" as the natives say. That phrase literally means that there are 6 villages in the northern section of the town and 6 villages in the southern section (if you imaginarily divide the town into two sections).

Achi town is surrounded by some other towns: Isuochi (in Abia State), Inyi (also part of Oji River LGA of Enugu State, Ugbo, and Mmaku (Awgu LGA of Enugu State) and some parts of Udi LGA of area of Enugu State.

The most popular village at Achi is Isikwe. Isikwe comprises Umuakpu, Obinagu, Abor and other minor villages. Umuakpu is termed 'Small London' because of its numerous modern buildings owned by its men and women mainly residing at Europe and United States of America. Isikwe has its own water pipe line, electrification and telephone system. Isikwe is noted for its production of doctors, nurses, pharmacists, economists, modern businessmen and other professionals. And also popular is Agbadala Achi with prominent sons and daughters

Large part of Achi is made up of sandy and loamy soil. Towns and communities are known for the cultivation of different crops including cashew trees, pineapples and mellon. These grow fairly well in Achi.

Villages of Achi: 1. Elugwu la Nkpokoro 2. Amankpunatọ 3. Isikwe 4. Agbadala 5. Egwu 6. Ehuhe 7. Adụ 8. Umumba(ogu) 9. Ihe 10. Amaetiti 11. Elugwu Akwu 12. Ahani

Achi is not only a name of a tree, people answer the name Achi, like Achi Herbert Chijindu is a lecturer, registered Quantity Surveyor and CEO/MD Chiherb International Limited.

== Buildings ==
There are several primary schools in Achi with all 12 villages having at least one primary school. The oldest Secondary educational institutions in Achi include Corpus Christi College (founded in 1960) and Girls Secondary School (founded in 1962). Also found in Achi is Savory Memorial Seminary, an Anglican Seminary owned by Diocese of Oji-River, Anglican Communion.

Another popular institution is the Achi Joint Hospital, which is a fairly old hospital. For several years it was and perhaps is still the best hospital in what used to be known as Awgu division in the then East Central State.

There is a fairly old institution known as Achi Farm School (founded around 1960). The institution has for several years been training agricultural extension officers who are currently scattered all over eastern Nigeria.

== See also ==
- Populated places in Enugu State
