= Toby Okechukwu =

Attorney and politician

Toby Okey Okechukwu
- Succeeded by: Anayo Onwuegbu
- Constituency: Aninri/Agwu/Oji-uzo

Personal details
- Born: 3 August 1962 (age 64)
- Education: University of Calabar; Anambra State University of Technology; University of Lagos
- Occupation: Lawyer, politician
- Profession: legal professional

Toby Okechukwu is an attorney who represented the Aninri, Awgu, and Oji River Federal Constituency in Enugu State in the House of Representatives of Nigeria in the 9th National Assembly. He was succeeded by Anayo Onwuegbu.

== Early life and education ==
Hon Okechukwu was born on August 3, 1962, in Ugbo, Agwu Local Government Area of Enugu State. In 1976, completed his primary education at Community Primary School Ngene before proceeding to St. Vincent's Secondary School Agbogugu where he obtained a GCE in 1981.

Hon Okechukwu earned a Bachelor of Engineering in 1986 from the University of Calabar, a Master of Business Administration in 1991 from the Anambra State University of Technology, and a Bachelor of Laws (LLB) in 2000 from the University of Lagos. He continued to the Nigerian Law School at Victoria Island, Lagos, and received his bar admission in 2001.

== Politics ==
In 2011, Hon. Toby was elected to the Federal House of Representatives on the People's Democratic Party (PDP) platform to represent Aninri/Agwu/Oji-uzo. He was re-elected in 2015 and again in 2019.

During the 9th National Assembly, Okechukwu served as the Deputy Minority Leader of the House of Representatives. He represented the Aninri/Awgu/Oji River Federal Constituency from 2019 to 2023. In 2023 general election, he was succeeded by Anayo Onwuegbu as the member representing the constituency.
