= Ugbo =

Town in Enugu, Nigeria

Ugbo is one of the few aborigines east of the River Niger, Nigeria, and has existed in its current location dating back to the Ancient History (3000 BC – AD 500). The town is known for its natural habitat, including serene hills, caves, large rocks and stones, rivers, forests, wild animals, and fertile lands. Ugbo is the ancestral home to many towns in Igboland. Ogulugu (which later split into Ugbo and the neighboring Obeagu community) is the oldest son of Ewa (Ewee), the original progenitor of nearby communities, including Amoli, Agbudu, Isu-Awaa (Ewa), Ituku, Ogbaku, Obe, Ozalla and Mgbowo. The Ewa (Awaa) kindred, together with Ntuegbe, make up what is known as Mbanabor clan in Awgu LGA of Enugu State. Based on 2006 census, the population of Ugbo is projected to be about 32,000. Ugbo comprises three autonomous communities, namely, Ugbo Okpala, Ugbonabor, and Ngene Ugbo. Ugbo-Okpala is made up of three major villages, namely, Umuebem, Uhugwu, Umuonaga (including Oyibo Ugbo).

== Location ==
Ugbo is located in a hill-top, northwest part of Awgu Local Government Area, Enugu State. The town occupies a vast area of land bounded by other communities, such as Obeagu to the southwest, Achi to the west, Amoli to the northwest, Owelli to the north, Ogugu to the east, and Mmaku to the south.

== Traditional government ==
Ugbo features traditional rulers and chiefs.

== Religion ==
There are two main types of religion in Ugbo, namely, Native Religion and Christianity. Native Religion: Many deities and oracles exist in the town but most notable is the Anu Ogulugu. The Anu Ogulugu is the supreme deity and sits at a hilltop, Umu-Ewa, the ancestral home of the different Ewa communities, from where he is worshiped and oversees the welfare of Ugbo and the entire Ewa people. Christianity: After a stern resistance and a fierce battle that lasted for years, the White Christian Missionaries finally gained entrance to Ugbo in the year 1917. Since then, Christianity has grown in the town with many denominations but most common have been the Anglicans and the Catholics. Notable churches are the Emmanuel Anglican Church, Ugbo-Okpala (1918); St. Anthony's Catholic Church Ugbonabor|St. Anthony's Catholic Church Ugbonabor (1933); St. Bridget's Catholic Church, Ngene Ugbo (1935; and the Christ Apostolic Church, Ugbo-Okpala.

== Festivals ==
Ugbo celebrates Native as well as Christian festivals. Prominent native feasts include Iriji ohu (new yam festival) which is observed yearly; the famous Aju (Iwa ekwa-age grade celebration) which comes every three years in the month of August; and Olili Anu Ogulugu, which is also commemorated at three-year intervals. It is worthy of note that the Olili Anu Ogulugu has lost steam in recent years due to the growing popularity of Christian religion in the town. The common Christian celebrations are the Christmas and Easter, marked every year for the birth of Jesus Christ and his ascension to heaven, respectively.

== Education ==
The town has two secondary schools: Community Secondary School Ugbo-Okpala, and Community Secondary School, Ugbo, a campus of the Federal College of Fisheries and Marine Technology;in addition to Police Secondary School, Ugbo currently under construction by the Federal Government of Nigeria. The town has a Computer centre, three primary schools in the three autonomous communities, and other private schools. Also coming to Ugbo is the proposed African Leadership Library & Museum, a library to be grounded in place and landscape to allow scholars to explore leadership through the lens of the unique emotional and historical African traditional leadership models, practices, and themes.

== Healthcare ==
The entire Ugbo community is served by the Community Health Centers at Ugbo-Okpala, Ugbonabor and Ngene Ugbo. The Health Centre at Ugbonabor is affiliated to the University of Nigeria Teaching Hospital. The town also features private clinics, including Chimdike Hospital and Maternity, Ugbo, that serves the town and neighbouring towns, such as Amoli, Owelli, Ogugu. Obeagu, Achi, and Inyi.

== Water ==
Primary source of water is the famous Oji-River, which originates at Ishi Oji in Agu Ewa in Ugbo. The river traverses through the entire town before flowing to the neighboring communities. Ugbo also enjoys modern developments in water resources through the construction of Ugbo Dam and borehole water projects.

== Road ==
Ugbo boasts of two major roads: the 5 km Ugbo-Achi and 4 km Ugbo-Mmaku roads. The town also boasts of a network of inter and intra-village asphalt roads.

== Economics ==
Ugbo has a diversified economic base in the fields of agriculture, education, politics, trade and industry. Ugbo is also endowed with abundant but untapped natural resources, including stones, clay, iron, fertile land, and traces of coal and gas deposits. The agricultural mainstay of the town includes yam, cocoyam, and cassava cultivation. The Ugbo cocoyam (Ede ndi Ugbo) is the choice of buyers who travel from all parts of Southern Nigeria to the central market, Nkwo Ugbo, where sellers from the three autonomous communities converge after every four market days. Ugbo is blessed with abundant natural resources, such as fertile lands, sand and gravel, clay, stones, coal, crude oil, diamond, kaolin, and forestry resources. The town is the headquarters of the Umueben Evergreen Multi-Purpose Cooperative Society LTD, which helps to enhance the town's economic activities.

== Culture ==
Ugbo has diverse native cultures which have eroded in recent times due to the influence of Christianity in the community. See Religion. Yet, the town still boasts of cultural masquerade and dance groups, most notably, Ogba Agu Cultural Dance, Ugbo-Okpala; Okobolo, Ugbonabor; and women dance groups, among others, which typically feature during traditional ceremonies.

== Localities ==
- Oyibo ugbo

== See also ==
- Populated places in Enugu State
