= Amankwo, Inyi =

Village in Nigeria

Amankwo
- Village
- Interactive map of Amankwo
- Coordinates (Eke Square): 6.1414°N 7.2714°E
- Country: Nigeria
- State: Enugu
- Local Government Area: Oji River
- Town: Inyi, Enugu
- Founder: Amankwo (or Nkwo)
- Seat: Okaoome Hall

Government
  - Type: Village Council
  - Body: Okaoome
  - Chairman: Jude Onyebueke
- Elevation: 136.31 m (447.2 ft)
- Time zone: UTC+1 (West Africa Time (WAT))
- Postal code: 401148
- ISO 3166 code: NG.EN.OR.IN.AM

Amankwo is a village in Inyi Ward 3, Agbada-Inyi Autonomous community, Inyi town, Oji River Local Government Area, Enugu State. It is known for its coal deposits. A part of it also has clay deposits, valuated for its potentials in ceramics applications. Amankwo comprises ten hamlets which are:

- Abodu
- Umuelebu
- Okwuishi
- Okpuno/Umuorum
- Alaocha
- Umuike
- Umuekwomba
- Umuechiri
- Umuekwo, and
- Umuowara.

Amankwo is further grouped into three quarters namely:

1. Obuna-Ugwu Amankwo comprising, Abodu, Umuelebu and Okpuno/Umuorum;
2. Obuna-Etiti Amankwo made up of Alaocha, Umuechiri And Umuekwo, and
3. Obuna-Agbo Amankwo which are Okwuishi, Umuekwomba, Umuowara and Umuike.

== Geography ==
Amankwo is located in the east of Mamu River Valley and southwest of Enugu metropolis. Amankwo is geographically positioned approximately between latitudes 6°07'39.7" to 6°07'41.2" north of the equator and longitudes 7°17'33.3" to 7°17'35.6" east of Greenwich. It is accessible through the Oji-Achi-Inyi-Ufuma road. Its postal code is 401148.

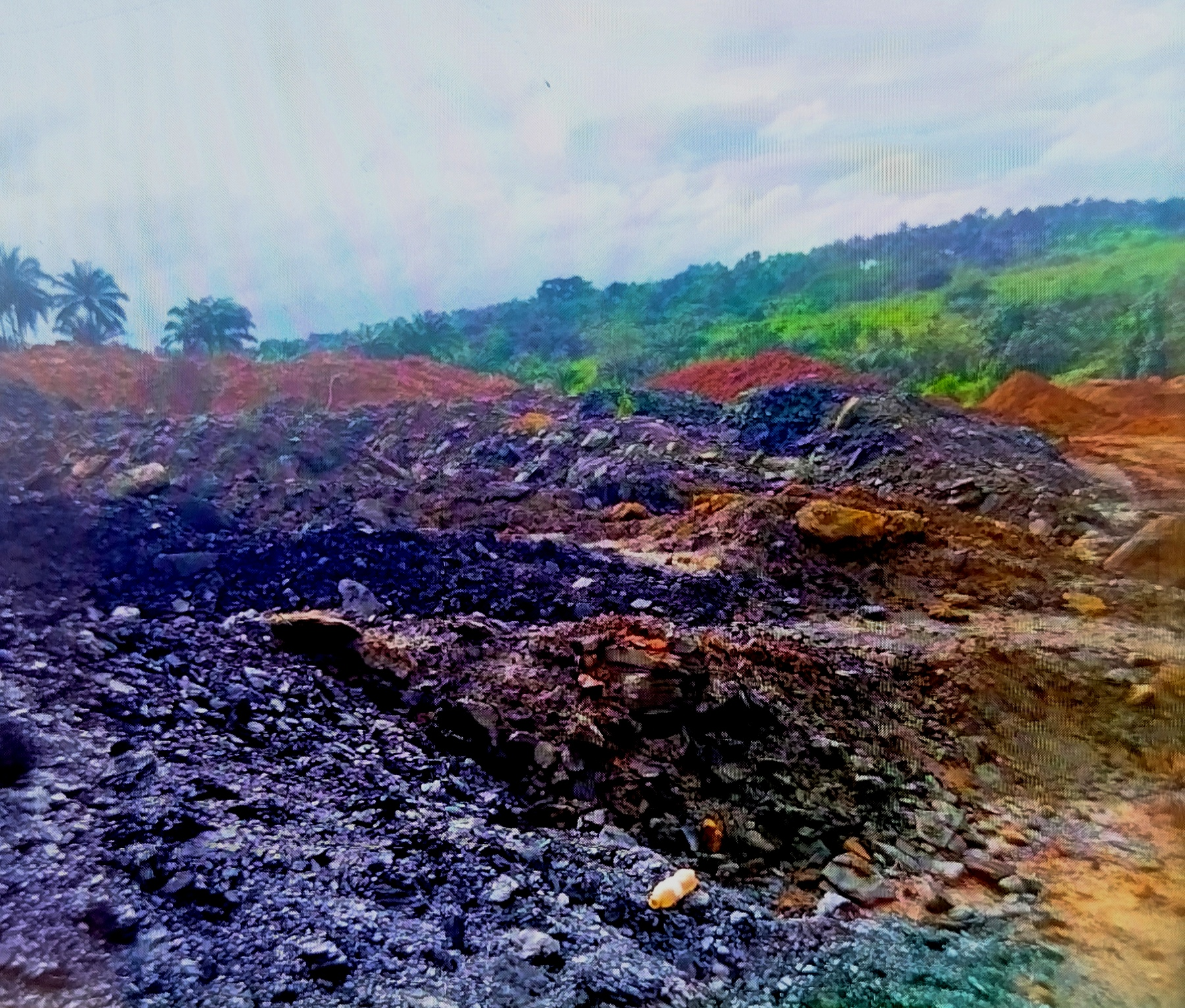
Coal mining site in Amankwo village, Inyi town, Oji River Local Government Area, Enugu State, Nigeria.

== History ==
Amankwo was most likely born when Inyi, his father, was in his middle age. He was the fourth son of Inyi. Inyi “settled at a spot now in Umuome village, called “OBU INYI”. Thus, Amankwo was born in Obu Inyi. His paternal older brothers (possibly not strictly uterine) were Ome, Enugwu, and Obule. His paternal younger brother was Iji (who later begot Agbara). Amankwo’s mother was one of Inyi’s wives, possibly Ukagbantu.

Amankwo may have been named “Nkwo” but his name evolved to “Amankwo” to indicate his settlement, that is “Nkwo’s settlement” (Ama Nkwo). It may also be a pointer that his offspring contributed most to the site of Nkwo market. There is the possibility, that over the years, in the struggle to differentiate his commune from the site of the Nkwo market, much of which was still part of the land of his offspring, their name which could have been “Umunkwo” had to be “Amankwo”. The meaning of Amankwo is also simply “the site of Nkwo”.

Amankwo and his brothers were very close. It was from their togetherness that the expression Inyi ji ofu iko anu mmanya began. This proverbial expression means that Inyi people are comfortable with drinking together from one cup of palm wine, indicating that ordinarily anyone from Inyi desires unity and peace. Deriving from this example, the offspring of these brothers practiced the “Inyi nw’ochucho” philosophy, meaning the sweet ambiance of Inyi/ pax inyi. The expression became popular at the time when the people of ancient Inyi lived together in great peace. Amankwo, with his four brothers, were known as “Inyi N’ese Omire” (The five sons of Inyi of great prowess). It became a proverbial expression with time. This saying preserves for history the accurate number of the direct sons of Inyi. It came about from their prowess. For as the five sons of Inyi grew into manhood, they exhibited the character of great strength, wrestling and farming skills inherited from their father. They became renowned and acquired recognition as “umuinyi nese omire.” Thus, in admiration and praise of the town, its indigenes usually say, “Inyi n’ese omire”.

Again, the five sons referred to are Ome, Enugwu, Obune, Nkwo, and Iji (his own son was Agbara). They became the progenitors of the following villages of Inyi: Umuome, Enugwu-Inyi, Obune, Amankwo, and Agbariji. Amankwo found a baby in the bush and named him Agu. He became his foster father. Agu is the progenitor of Umuagu village in Inyi. Amankwo and his wives gave birth to Abodu, Elebu, Okwuishi, Okpuno/Orum, Alaocha, Ike and Enikpe. Enikpe would later beget Ekwomba, Echiri, Ekwo and Owara.

=== Coal crisis ===
On October 1, 2025, some unknown gun men killed a young male citizen of Amankwo, Mr. Chinonso Amaka, amidst dissatisfaction in the villagers about the way the Enugu State Government began to mine coal in the village, without adequate orientation about due compensation, while causing the pollution of the Odu rivulet, destruction of houses and a main road.

== Education ==
Amankwo has many schools, including Community School; and Girls High School (built in 1976). The Enugu State Government began to build a Smart Green School in the village in 2024.

== Notable personalities ==
- Christopher Anagu, First indigene to obtain a Grade Two teachers certificate.
- Pius Madu, First indigene to attend a university.
- John Unaegbu
- Nestor Onyegbuna
- Sir Victor Udah, President- General, Agbada Inyi Autonomous Community, Oji River.
- Jude Onyebueke, Chairman of Okaoome (Amankwo Village ruling council)

== Entertainment ==
Amankwo is notable for its hospitality and sense of entertainment. There is a song about Inyi town, which includes the village.
