= Ugwueme =

Town descriptions and geography

Coordinates: 6°1′2.5″N 7°26′21″E

Ugwueme is a town in Awgu local government in Enugu State, southeastern Nigeria. About 10 kilometres (6.2 mi) southwest of the town of Awgu (the local government headquarters), Ugwueme is bordered to the north by Nnenwenta, on the east by Awgu town, and on the south by Lokpanta. It shares its western border with Isuochi. Ugwueme has six villages namely according to order of seniority. Okpensi Amagu Ihite Ụmụokpara Obulo Ugwuanya.

The six villages has sub villages under them.Ugwueme Community: Major Villages in Order of Seniority.

According to the traditional order of birth and seniority, the six major villages that make up Ugwueme Community are:

Okpensi – First child (the eldest)

Amagu – Second child

Ihite – Third child

Obulo – Fourth child

Umuokpara – Fifth child

Ugwuanya – Sixth child (the youngest)

This is the traditional order of seniority in Ugwueme Community, reflecting the sequence of ancestral lineage.

While each village is equal in dignity and importance, this order remains a significant part of the history, culture, and heritage of the Ugwueme people.

Order of Seniority: Okpensi → Amagu → Ihite → Obulo → Umuokpara → Ugwuanya.

According to the National Population Commission (2006), Ugwueme has an estimated population of 13,000 people. The town is accessible through a network of un-sealed roads, laterite graded roads, and several footpaths through Awgu market, Nkwe, and Isuochi.the Notable landmarks in Ugwueme include leading to Ugwueme, Okpukpomkpume( daily market square, Nwaho ikoro market, community secondary school Ugwueme, DAOKEM Hotels and suites. Old mission, St Theresa's Catholic Church, Community school Ugwueme, Mount Horeb pilgrimage center okpuagu, Health center, Okpudii,Ezibou secondary school Ugwueme and Ogbuduu.

== Geography ==
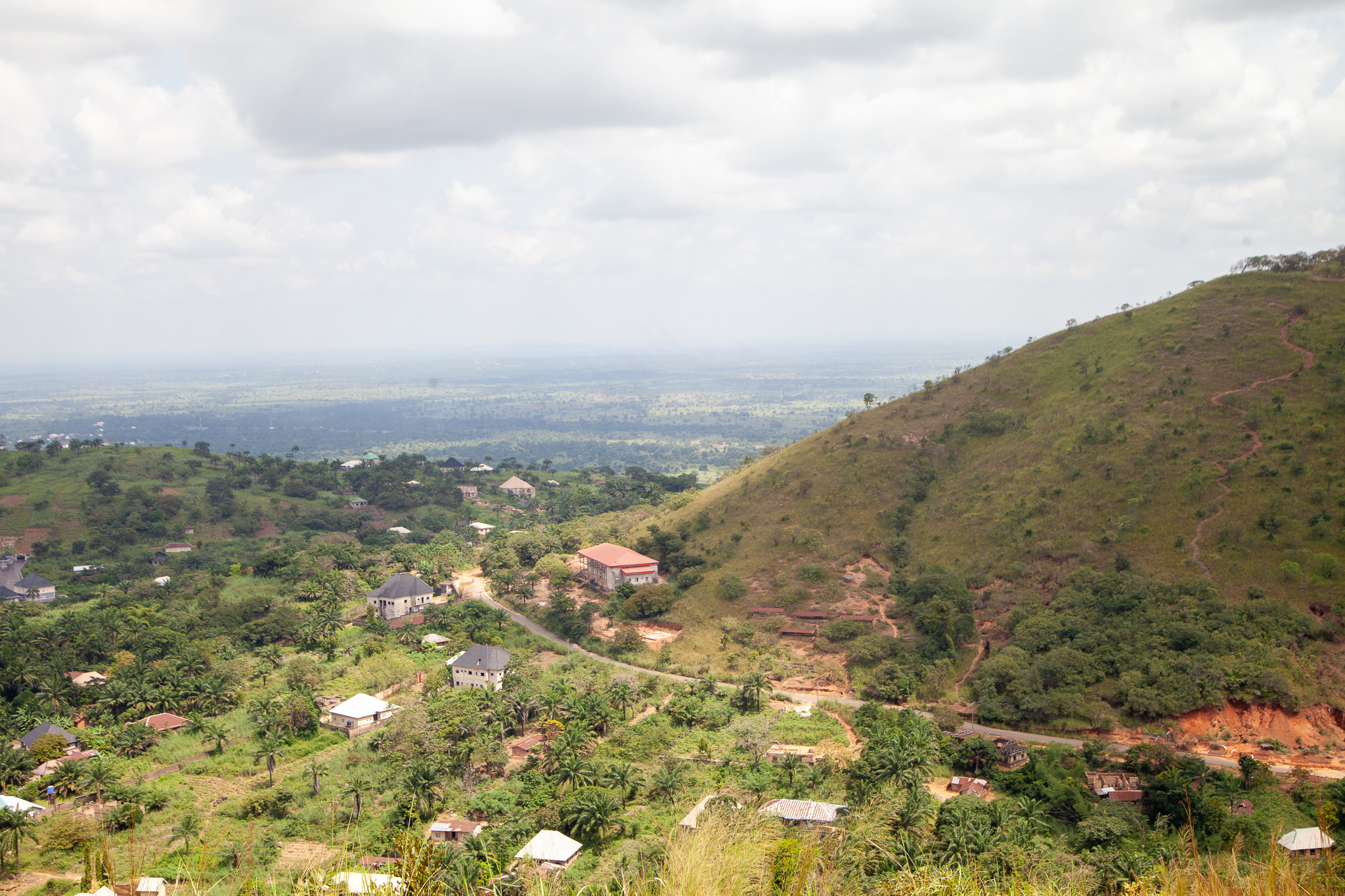
View of Ugwueme from Ihite mountain

Ugwueme is surrounded by hilly valleys with green vegetation and a temperate climate. The region experiences heavy rainfall, especially during June, July, and September. The natural landscape consists of elevated topography, reaching an altitude of about 400–850 m (1,300-2,790 feet), above the sea level. The highland has various layers of coal and hydrocarbon deposits. An evaluation of Ugwueme Tar sand deposits indicated degraded levels of crude oil with "frequent reports of oil associated seepages at the gentle slope in Ugwueme area during and immediately after each rainy season period every year".

== History ==
Ugwueme history is intertwined with the history of the Igbo people, who have inhabited the region for generations. According to oral history, the town was founded by a group of early settlers from the neighboring Isuochi town who fled to the mountain for safety, hence the name Ugwu-eme - lit. 'The Hill has done well'. The hilly landscape provided a natural defense mechanism, safeguarding the early settlers from potential threats from warring neighbors and ensuring their security.

== Culture ==
The town is renowned for its vibrant cultural festivities and traditions. The annual New yam festival (Egbeajala), is a major event in the town. Residents express their gratitude for a bountiful harvest by offering yams to their various deities. The festival is marked by traditional dances, masquerades, colorful attire, and communal feasts, attracting visitors from neighboring towns and villages.

Ugwueme culture also includes traditional marriage (igbankwu Nwanyi) and afvuru agu (reconnecting one's root through one's maternal home).

== Economy ==
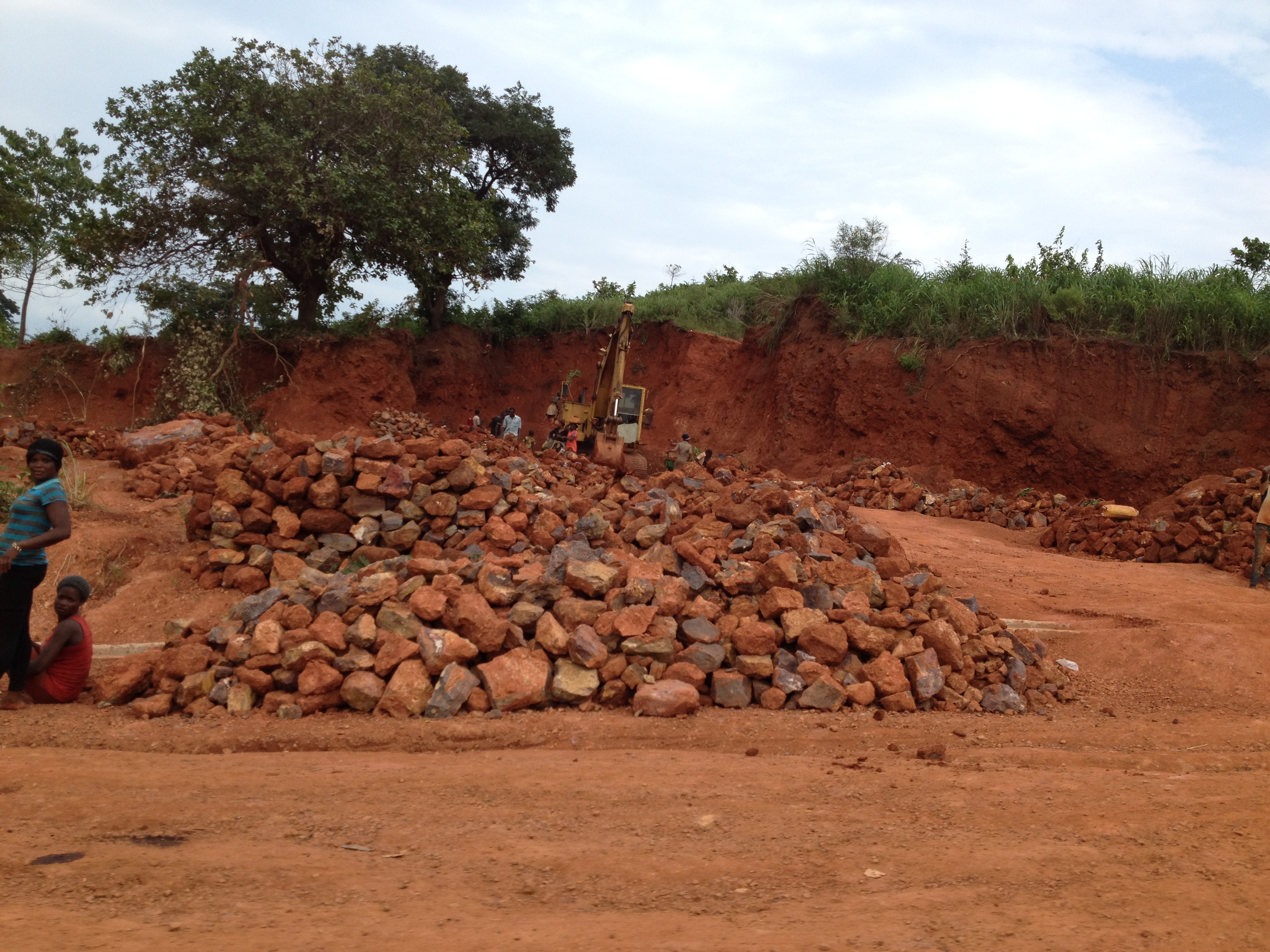
View of Stone Quarry activity in Ugwueme

Ugwueme is predominantly rural and agrarian. A substantial proportion of its working population engages in subsistence farming and relies on cash crops like cassava, yam, cocoyam, vegetables, corn, Palm oil, African breadfruit. Bush fallowing, mixed cropping and shifting cultivation are prominent farming practices in Ugwueme. Local farmers live in communal areas, travel by foot to their farm land early in the morning, and return just before sunset. Livestock rearing, palm wine extraction, and stone quarrying are also common economic activities.

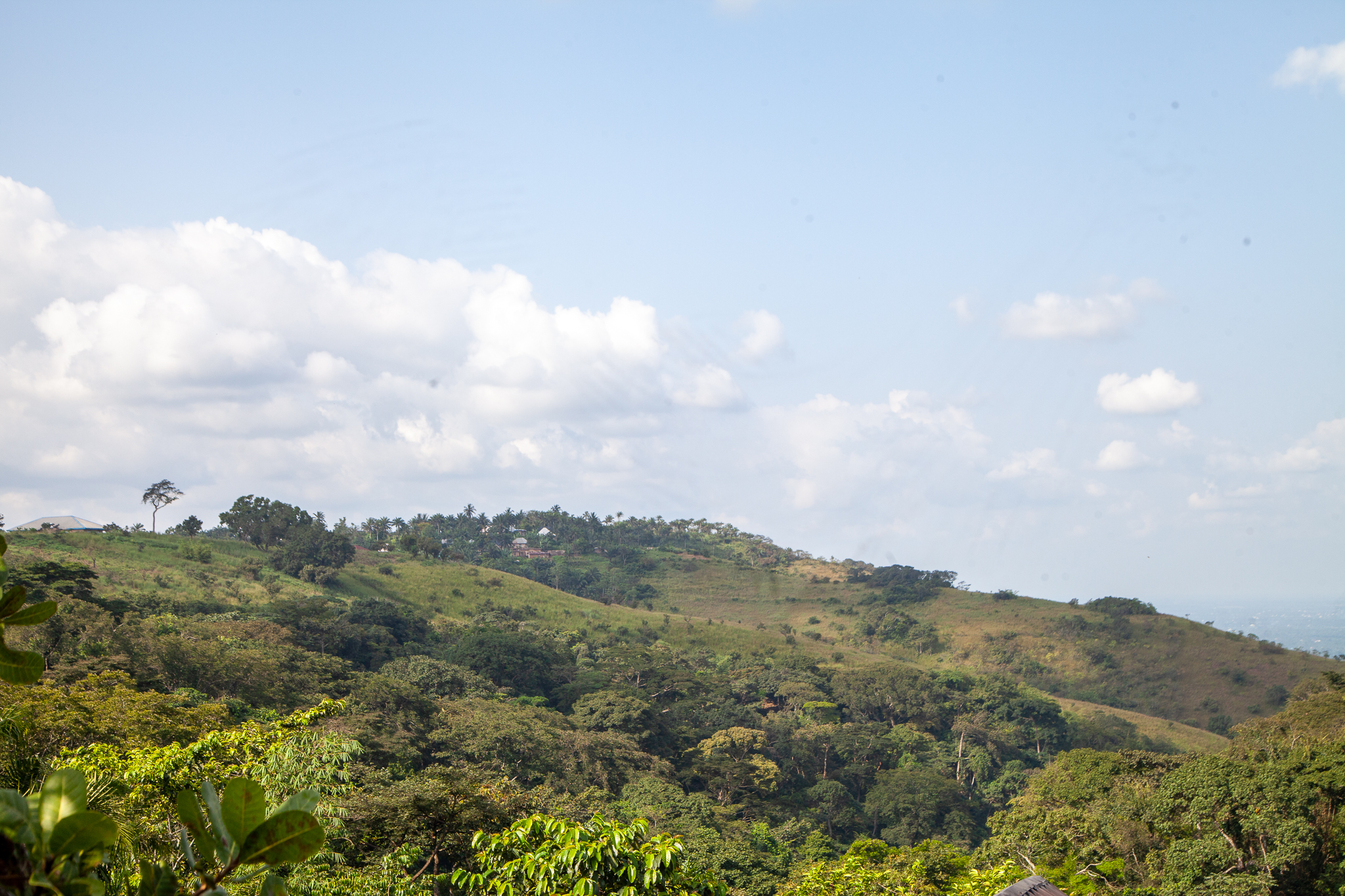
View of Ugwueme landscape

Trading is also a dominant occupation. Two major trading markets located in Ugwueme. Ekeagu market in Agulese community takes place on Eke day. Nwahoikoro market at Eziobu community takes place during Afor day. Various farm products are traded in these markets on wholesale and retail basis every four days. A central market operates daily at the town center, Okpukponkpume.

== Politics ==
The three major political parties in Ugwueme are people's Democratic party (PDP) All Progressive Alliance Congress and Labour Party (LP).

Ugwueme has two autonomous communities, namely Agulese and Eziobu Autonomous Community. Each autonomous community is governed by an elected town union President General (P.G) and traditional council headed by Igwe (King).

- Agulese Ugwueme General Assembly (President General: Dr. Sunday Okafor ) - made up of Amagu, Ihite and Ugwuanya Villages
- Eziobu Town Union (President General: Hon Nwafor Chinedu) Eziobu Ugwueme is made up of Okpesi, Obulo, and Umuokpara Villages

Prior to the establishment of the two autonomous communities by Enugu state government, Ugwueme was under one Traditional Council, headed by the Traditional Ruler (Igwe). HRH Igwe Solomon Okereke Oluah was the first traditional ruler who governed until his death in late 1990s. Since the creation of the autonomous communities, Agulese Ugwueme installed His Royal Highness (HRH) Igwe Godwin Oluneziobi Okereke as its first traditional ruler. Following the passing of HRH Igwe Godwin Oluneziobi Okereke in 2020, no new traditional ruler has been elected and installed either in Agulese or Eziobu autonomous community. In the absence, President General of the town unions oversee the affairs of the town.

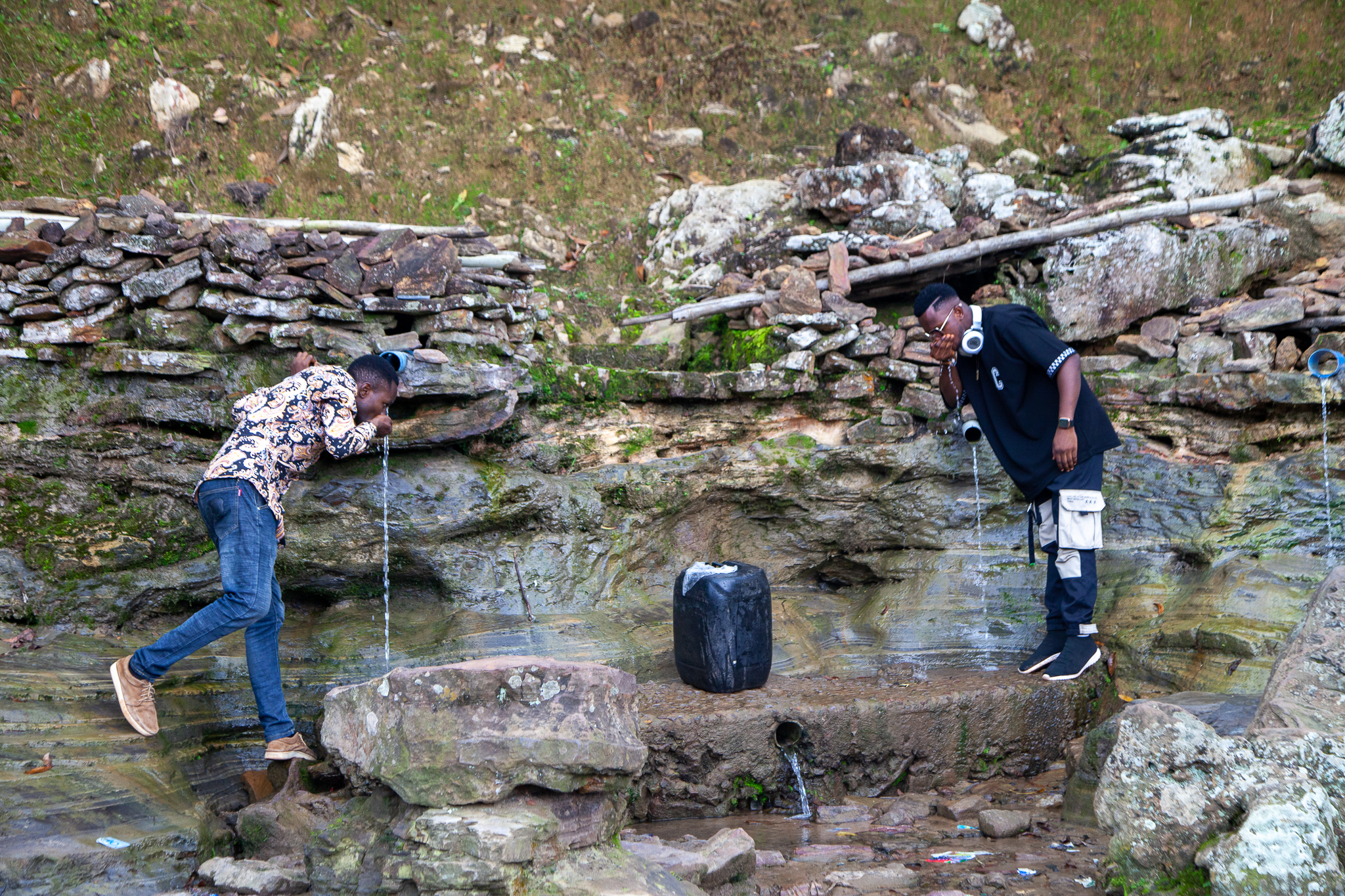
Natural spring water in Ugwueme

== Notable landmarks ==
- Mount Horeb, a prayer ground
- St. Matthew Methodist Church
- St. Theresa Catholic Parish
- Okpukume - The village center
- Natural springs - drinking water sources
- Diokem hotels and suites
- Community school Ugwueme
- Central school Ugwueme
- Eziobu secondary school
- Community secondary school (obuboeh)

And the current ongoing Smart school
