= Chris Baywood Ibe =

Nigerian businessman

Emperor Chris Baywood Ibe
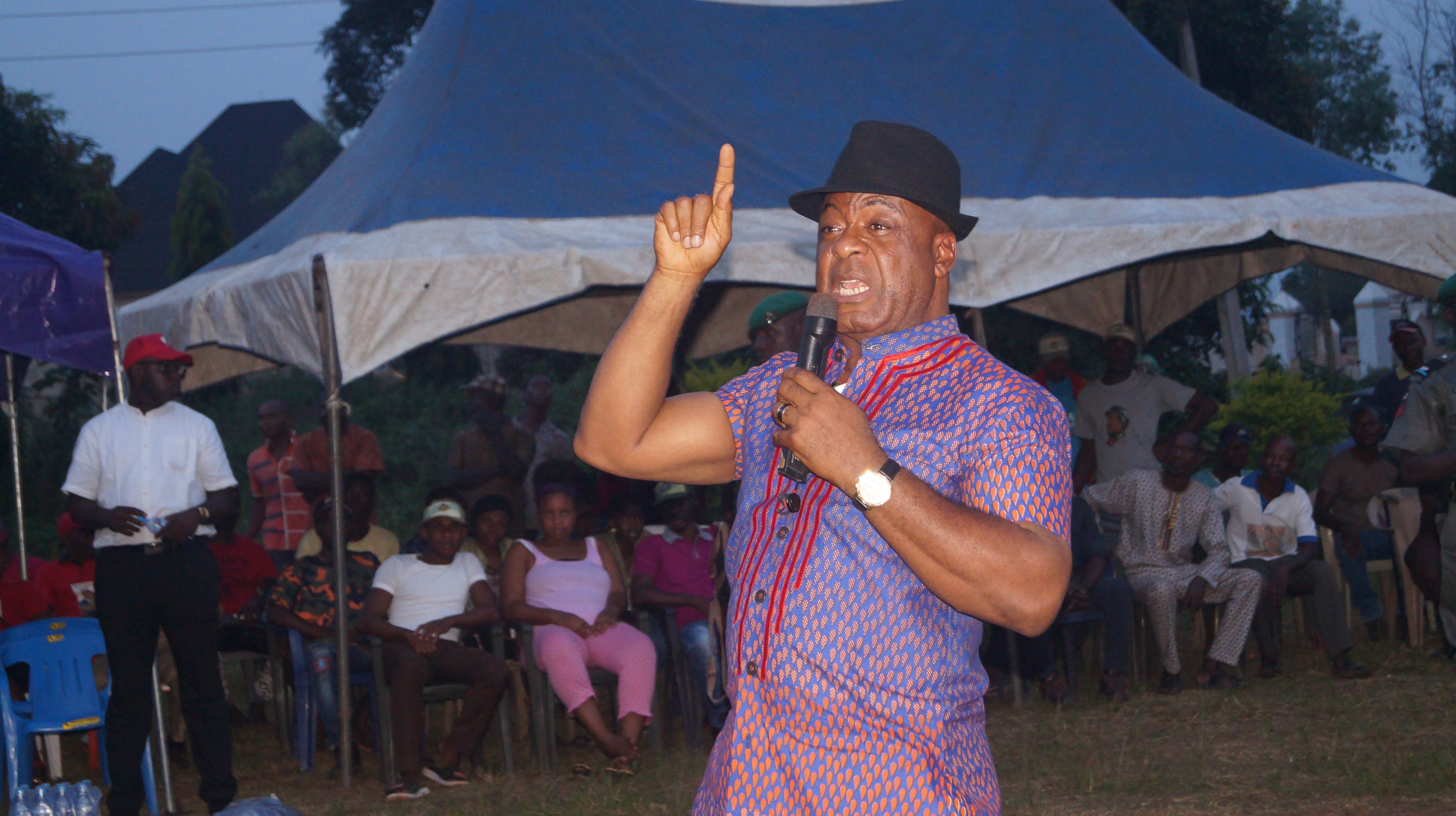
- Emperor Baywood in Enugu
- Born: Chris Baywood Ibe; Enugu State, Nigeria
- Occupation: Entrepreneur
- Years active: 1989 - present
- Family: H.R.H Igwe U. Maduka (uncle)

Chris Baywood Ibe, also known as Emperor Chris Baywood Ibe, is a Nigerian entrepreneur, philanthropist and social activist. He hails from Isu-Awaa in Awgu Local Government Area, Enugu state. He is the president and CEO of Baywood Group, a Nigerian conglomerate involved in oil & gas, engineering, construction, procurement, and aviation.

== Early life and education ==
Ibe was born in Enugu in the then East Central State of Nigeria. He received his early education at Central Primary School, Isu-Awaa and thereafter at Colliery Comprehensive Secondary School, Ngwo, Enugu, before moving on to pursue and obtain his higher education in Quantity Surveying in Belgrade in then okereke science in 1987.

== Career ==
On completion of his studies, Ibe returned to Nigeria and established Baywood Continental Limited, initially as a procurement company in 1989 before venturing into other sectors; birthing sister companies which he also heads, including Baywood Exploration, ZB Joint Ventures Limited, Tropical Arctic Logistics Ltd (TAL), an Aviation Group.

In November 2025, Ibe launched CBI News, a digital news platform in Lagos.

=== Baywood Continental Limited ===
Following its establishment in 1989, Baywood Continental Limited began business as a procurement company before extending its reach to other sectors like engineering, energy, Operations & Maintenance and construction.

The company has grown to a notable position in the Nigerian Oil and Gas sector, with a clientele list which includes the Nigerian National Petroleum Corporation, Chevron, Total, Shell, ExxonMobil, Addax, and NPDC among others.

=== Politics ===
Ibe is a chieftain of Nigeria's ruling political party, the All Progressives Congress in Enugu State, southeast Nigeria.

=== Save Awgu Forum Enugu (SAFE) ===
In 2014, Ibe founded a platform known as Save Awgu Forum Enugu (SAFE) to facilitate the development and growth of Awgu community; for the emancipation, education and enlightenment of the people of his constituency in Enugu State where he spent most of his childhood.
