= Mgbidi =

Mgbidi may refer to:

- Mgbidi, Imo, Nigeria
- Mgbidi, Enugu, Nigeria
