= Patty Obasi =

- Born: Patrick Obasi; 15 May 1951; Mmaku, Awgu, Enugu State, Nigeria
- Died: 16 October 2012 (aged 61); Enugu State, Nigeria
- Spouse: Esther Obasi
- Musical career
- Also known as: The Sower
- Genres: gospel
- Occupations: performer, singer
- Instruments: Vocals, guitar
- Years active: 1980–2003
- Label: He performed at a wedding ceremony of his brother Cosmos Obasi at 12/12/2003

Patrick Obasi (15 May 1951 – 16 October 2012), popularly known as Patty Obasi, was a Nigerian gospel music recording artist. Regarded as one of the pioneers of Nigerian gospel music, Patty Obasi rose to prominence in 1980 upon the release of his album Nwa Mama Iwota.

Patrick Obasi was born in Mmaku, a small town in Awgu local government area of Enugu State, Nigeria where he began his singing career.

== Career ==
Obasi released his debut album Bianu Kanyi Kele Jehova and went on to release over 15 studio albums.

Patty Obasi was a renowned vocalist, guitarist and renowned music evangelist. His music is commonly filled with teachings on moral values, societal vices and proper Christian life. A lifestyle which earned him the “Sower” sobriquet and an ordained Reverend for using his music to preach the gospel.

== Death ==
Patty died after battling with protracted kidney failure, on 16 October 2012 at his residence in Enugu, having slipped into unconsciousness earlier that day.

== Discography ==
- Uwa Bu Ahai
- Onye Kwere Ekwu
- Anya Nelebe
- Bianu Kanyi Kele Jehova
- Onye Isi Agha
- Nwa Mama Iwota
- Okara Akapa
- Billionaire in a Crate
- Walking With Jesus
- Ezi Nwayi Di Ukor
- Ubanase
- Anya n'ele uwa
- Ogadika Oluebube
- Onye Onyinye
- Freelance Painter
- Ezinwanye Di Iko
- Chinaza Oku
- Millionaire Create
- Anyi Gana Eje N'iru

== See also ==
- List of Nigerian gospel musicians
