= Oyibo ugbo =

Village in Nigeria

Oyibo Ugbo is one of the villages in Ugbo town in the Awgu local government area of Enugu State, Nigeria.

Oyibo Ugbo is bounded by their Ngene Ugbo and Ugbo Okpala kins, Obeagu, Ogwugwu, and Mmaku. Although still not categorized as a village by other villages that make up the town, because the [oyibo ugbo] are not direct descendants of ogulugu the progenitor of Ugbo people. Oyibo is socially, culturally, politically, and religiously under ngene ugbo autonomous community, but still maintain their ancestral tie with their Ugbo Okpala kins which is seen during the Aju Festival [Iwa Akwa], when the Ugbo Okpala people had to join their Oyibo kin to perform Iwa Akwa, their ancient festival.

== History ==
Oyibo Ugbo migrated to their present location from Ugbo Okpala centuries ago during a land dispute between the ugbo okpala people and mmaku people. according to stories, mmaku people were encroaching in their land, to prevent them from taking over, the community agreed that the oldest kindred should relocate to the disputed land to prevent Mmaku people from coming any further. Although the decision for them to leave their ancestral home and relocate to a land where they will be secluded from the rest of the people weren't accepted by them, but knowing what is at stake, they had to embark on the journey to protect their territory. Some of the affected kindred relocated while some stayed behind, the ones that stayed behind are Umu Onaga people of Ugbo Okpala, while the ones that relocated crossed Oji and journeyed through the hills and valleys of the town and made their way to the land. When they reached their destination they settled in different part of the land. Some settled at a place called Obodo Umuaho, while some settled at nwaogboezi/ebeadu in ogba-agbo, and the rest settled at obodo egbo. from this places the Oyibo Ugbo settled when they first came to the land which is now called Ndiuno, they spreed to other parts of the land. today Oyibo Ugbo is a village with four kindred namely umu nakwa, ama ugwu, umu ogene, and umu aba.

== Notable Indigens Of The Community ==
- Chief Simeon chukwunta
- Chief James Okafor
- Chief John Chukwu
- Josephat Ani
- Barr Tobias Ani
- Mr Thomas Chime
- Engr Pius Chukwunta
