= Mmaku =

LGA in Enugu State, Nigeria

Coordinates: 6.1169°N 7.4544°E

Mmaku Maku
- Town
- Nicknames: Beauty of Wealth, Embracer
- Location in Nigeria
- Country: Nigeria
- State: Enugu State
- LGA: Awgu

Population (2006 census)
  - Total: N/A
- Time zone: UTC+1 (WAT)
- 6-digit postal code: 402128

Mmaku is a town in the Awgu local government area of Enugu State, Nigeria. The name Mmaku means "Welcomer" or "Embracer". Another derivation comes from the English language, and it means "beauty of wealth."

Mmaku communities include Enugwu Agu, Affam, Ifite, Amagu, Otokwu, okwoluofia, and Ezioha. The Oji-Awgu road is the main thoroughfare in Mmaku. Surrounding communities are Ugbo, Obeagu, Mgbidi, Awgu, and Mgbowo.

== History ==
Several myths circulate the history of Mmaku.

=== Ezianu ===
One legend is about Anekemmadu, a hunter, who came to a land that was favorable to him and produced a good yield. He decided to live there with his wife, Dumeogwee. His wife gave birth to his second son, Ezianu. While the couple's other sons left, Ezianu decided to stay in the community.

According to this legend, Ezianu had a generous heart that prompted him to embrace a spirit in human form. He, therefore, received the name Mmaku. From then on, the name was given to him in addition to his birth name. Mmaku-Ezianu, as he was now called, got married and had two sons, MMaku-Ukwu and Mmaku-Nta. Mmaku-Nta in his turn had five sons: Enugu-Afam, Eziama, Mkpurumkpu, Awo, and Agboneri. Mmaku-Ukwu had seven sons: Amanato, Ezioha, Amegu, Enugu-Agu, Okwuluofia, Otokwu, and Ifite.

Eri had two wives, Nneamaku and Oboli. Nneamaku had five children: Nri-ifikwuanịm-Menri, his first son; Agụlụ, Ogbodudu, Onogu, and Iguedo, her only daughter. Nri-Ifikwuanịm begot Agụkwu Nri, Enugwu-Ukwu, Enugwu-Agidi, Nọfịa, and Amọbia. Nri-Ifikwuanim was a priest like his father Eri. Eri had continued the Jewish traditional worship even as he settled at Ezunaoamambala (now Anambra).

Nri-Ifikwuanim, being the first son of Eri, continued to establish and strengthen his father's kingdom. He was the custodian of the family tradition and the Royal Priest. Having five children from his first wife, he continued to have more children from his other wives and concubines. His kingdom was quick to expand.

By the time he passed on to his ancestors, his family was so large that some of the sons left with their families and migrated to the east and south, but none migrated north or west. Those that left continued with their father's traditions, the 'Igu-Aro' (observing the yearly calendar), child circumcision, and other rites.

Ezianu, a grandchild of Eri-Ifikwuanim, the son of Nneamaku, begot Mmaku, a twist of the suffix in his great grand mother's name, Nneamaku (Mother of the place of wealth). Ezianu (good land) arrived at the green belt after Awka (Oji/Awgu location) and he became so rich that he blessed the god of his ancestors for bringing him to the place and named it 'Ezi-anu.' He founded a dynasty after his name, named his first son Mma-Aku (beauty of wealth) and believed strongly that the name of his great-grandmother, Nneamaku, had influenced him to become wealthy. Ezianu settled and beget other children including Mmaku as the first son, Achi, Mgbowo, Nkwe, Ezere, Mgbidi, Awgu, and Awgu-nta. It has been confirmed that Ezianu migrated from the present day Amoli. The possibility of a blood link with Amoli is still being investigated.

When Ezianu passed on, Mmaku remained ancestral and spiritual custodian of the Ezi-anu Clan. Achi, who migrated northward of Mmaku's home, became friendly with other migrated descendants of Eri located at the west of Oji River hence the high influence of the cultures of the neighbors on its original cultures as can be observed today.

Mmaku, the first son of Ezi-anu, begot twelve children from two wives. The first wife begot Afam (Enugu Afam, the traditional and spiritual custodian of Ezi-anu deity), Eziama, Ibite, Mkpulukpu, Awo while the second wife begot Amanato (ancestral custodian on his mother's side of the family), Ezioha, Otokwu, Okwulofia, Amegu, Ezi Ajanu (Enugwu-Mmaku) and Ifite-Ohanta. Some of the descendants of Mmaku migrated to Arochukwu, today called Mmaku-Aro. Some of the descendants of Ezioha and Amanato migrated to Mgbowo to become part of today called Amanato and Ezioha Mgbowo while some descendants of Okwulofia migrated to Ogwugwu now known as Okwulofia Ogwugwu (Ebo-Ogwuwgu).

The chief ancestral shrine of Mmaku is the family house of Ezi-anu, the Ezi-anu Shrine located at Enugwu Affam. Kings are crowned at this location, considered the sacred spot of Mmaku. Until today, the dialect of Mmaku has never changed throughout the land of his grand-cousins and brothers in Nofia, Amobia, Enugwu-Agidi, Enugu-Ukwu and Agukwu-Nri, because according to Eri, first sons must keep to the original traditions, including their language.

== Governance ==
Mmaku is a town with three autonomous Communities namely Agunese Mmaku, Mmaku Ugwu, and Mmaku Agbo Autonomous Communities. Each autonomous community has a King (Igwe) who is the head and the main decision-maker of the community and is being assisted by other Chiefs (the kingmakers) headed by the Onowu.

== Spirituality ==
From oblivion, the people of Mmaku have a deity known as "Mmamu goddess." Mmamu River torched all the shackles of Mmaku (Onu n' asaa)." Umu Mmamu still maintain the Ikolo/Okwa of Mmamu till date. Due to the upholding of the ancestral Eri traditions, Mmaku has continued to be a place of spiritual revival. It has produced several Christian preachers and ministers, such as songwriter and singer Rev Patty Obasi, and South African based radio evangelists, Rev Ayobanna Ikeanumba and Rev Fr. James Ani (once alleged to have incited his followers to beat policemen).

== Culture ==
Known to be hospitable, they are most notable for how they entertain their guests after the initial offering of Kola nut (Oji) at any gathering or event. Mmaku people traditionally entertain their visitors by preparing Asaja (a species of Kidney bean).

== Economy ==
Agriculture remains the main economic strength of Mmaku, as is surrounded by streams enabling the perennial production of vegetables and tubers. There is a weekly Afor market located at Affam community. Economically, coal is found in the Mamu Formation deposited in Mmaku though no coal mine was seen in the study area during several geological field mapping carried out in Mmaku. Ironstone (Siderite) boulders outcrops majorly in Mmaku and its environs, The boulders are massive and are quarried at different locations in the site. They are ferruginized, highly indurated and compacted. The concentration of Iron in these ironstone units is low, hence, cannot be extracted as ore. Some of the uses of ironstones include slope stabilization and embankment filling. As a coarse aggregate for mixing with mortar and water in order to form strong concrete mixtures, it is also used for erosion control, especially in inclined terrain. Artisanal mining and quarrying of laterites and Ironstone form one of the major local economies of Mmaku. Abandoned quarry sites dot the landscape of Mmaku and its environs.

== Landmarks ==
Omoo Stream, Afam Mmaku

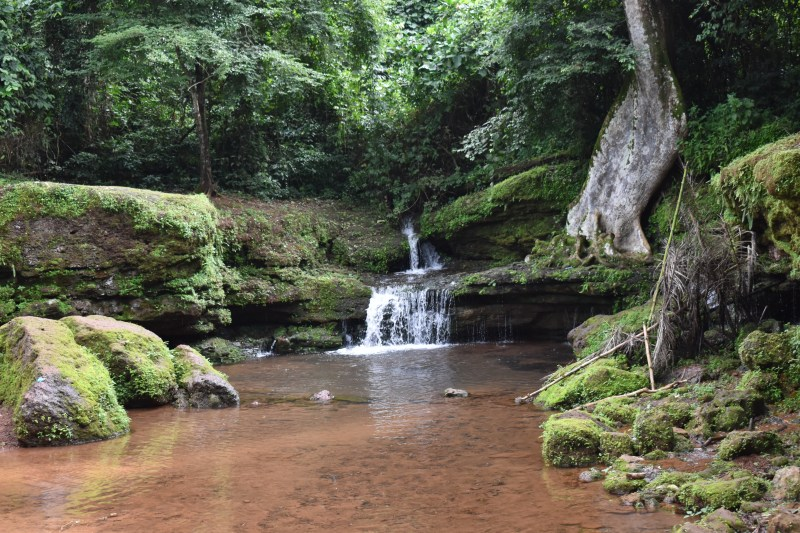
Omoo Stream mmaku

Mmaku is also a tourist site with various attractions such as:

- Ishi Mmam (Where Mmamu River has its source).
- Omoo Stream in Afam-Mmaku
- Ugwu nwa orji enugu Affam
- Mmiri Anaegu (Boundary Between Ifite and Mgbowo).
- Ogba n' aza oku (Echoing Cave)
- Afor mmaku market square
- Ngweleaka Obuohu
- Ishiota Obuohu Stream.
- St Philips Anglican Church (Archdeaconry), Enugu-Mmaku
- St Theresa Catholic Church, Ezioha-Mmaku
- St. John's Parish, Otokwu-Mmaku

Mmaku was the location of the fifth season of the reality television show Gulder Ultimate Search

== Hotels ==
Prominent Hotels in Mmaku include:

- Pat Benson's Green Valley Suites
- Maco Plaza Hotel
- Village Gate
- Nice & Cool Hotel

== Education ==
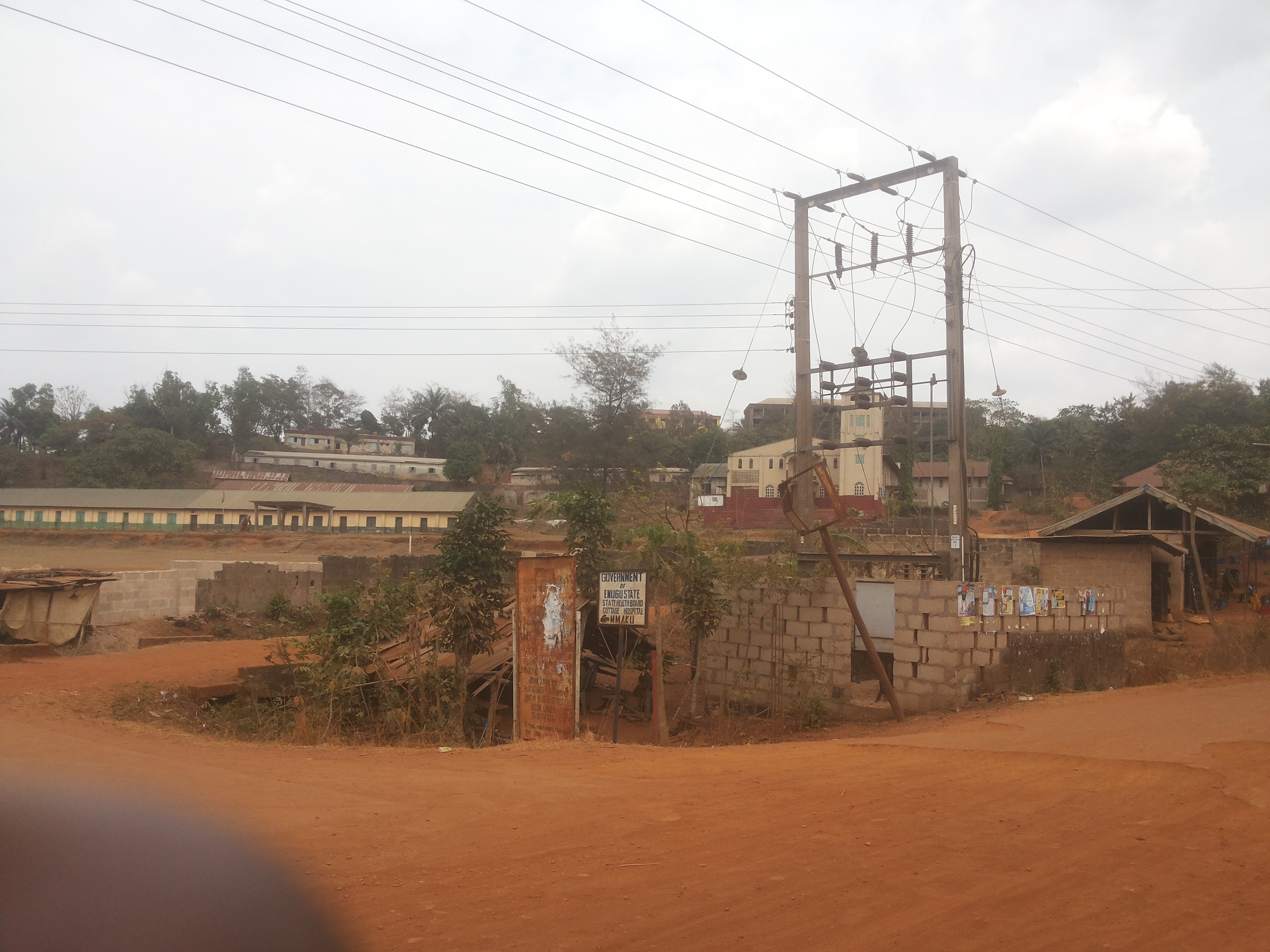
View of Mmaku Catholic Centre, showing Central School Mmaku, St. Theresa Catholic Church and St. Theresa Nursery, Primary and Secondary School (Founded and built by Rev. Fr. DDr. Innocent Udeafor)

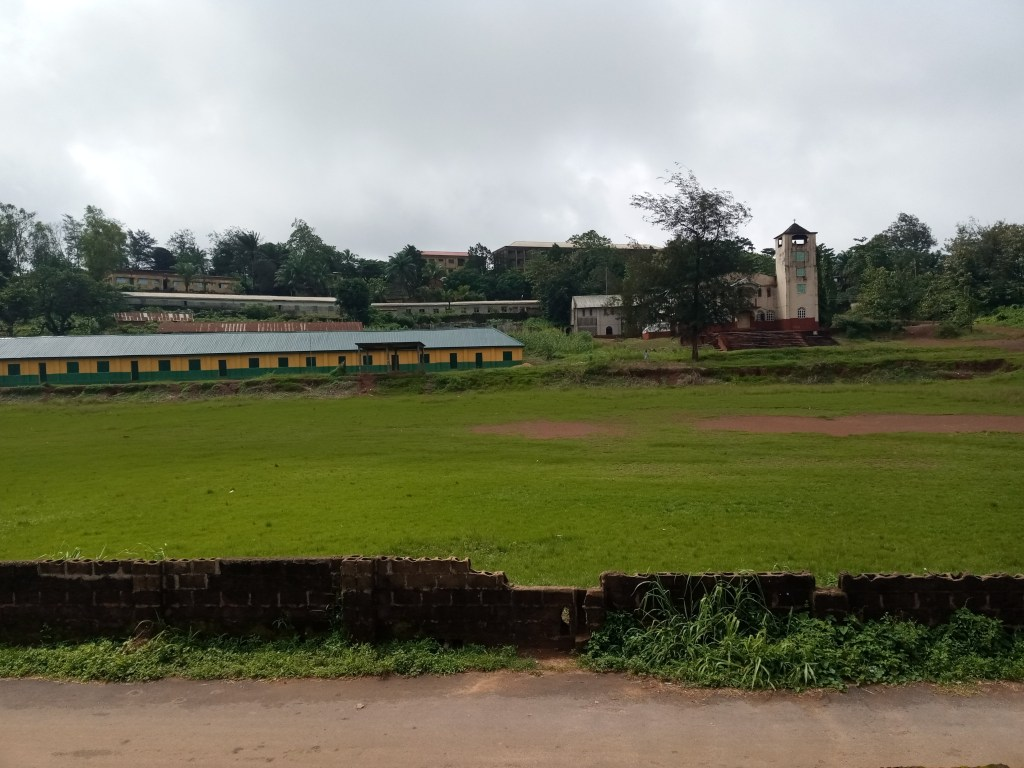
Central School Mmaku and St. Theresa Catholic Church, Ajaba in Ezioha Mmaku

=== Secondary school ===
- Mmaku High School, formally Boys' High School, Mmaku
- Girls' Secondary School Mmaku (formally Girls High School, Mmaku)
- Community Secondary School, Mmaku
- St. Theresa Secondary School (Mmaku Catholic Centre)
- Mmaku Girls Secondary School ( Now known as Community Secondary School, Afam Mmaku)

=== Primary school ===
- Central School, Mmaku
- Community (primary) School, Enugu-Mmaku,
- Udechukwu Memorial School, Ifite,
- Primary School, Otokwu
- St. Theresa Nursery and Primary School (Mmaku Catholic Centre)
- Community Primary School Affam Mmaku.
- Community Primary School, Ifite Ndiagu

== People from Mmaku ==
- Anthony Andeh
- Rev. Patty Obasi
- Hon. Uchenna I. Ekwe
- John Chukwu
- Davidson Andeh
