= Isuochi =

Town in Abia State, Nigeria

Isuochi is a community in Umunneochi local government area of Abia State. It borders Okigwe between Awgu hill and Achi in Enugu State, Owerre Ezukala in Anambra State. The population of Isuochi number around 45,000 people and cover approximately 3,962 square kilometres (1,530 mi^{2}) according to the 1990 Abia State Census Board. Isuochi has a lot of immigrant traders, farmers and workers.

Isuochi has two climate seasons in a year divided between the rainy and dry season with the highest temperature of 30 Celsius (86 Fahrenheit) usually around December and March and the lowest temperature recorded around June to July.

The topography of Isuochi is a mixture of predominantly savannah and a mixture of forests. Isuochi falls within the deciduous forest region the vegetation is predominantly grassland, not essentially savannah with forest in some places; this caused due to the porosity of the soil in the area.
