= Obinna Onodugo =

Nigerian professor, consultant and nephrologist

- Citizenship: Nigeria
- Occupation: Doctor

Obinna Onodugo is a Nigerian professor and consultant nephrologist who serves as the Chief Medical Director of the University of Nigeria Teaching Hospital (UNTH), Ituku-Ozalla, Enugu State.

== Education and career ==
Onodugo bagged a Bachelor of Medicine and Surgery (MBBS) degree. He is a member and fellow of the West African College of Physicians. He holds a Fellowship in Public Administration and a Master of Business Administration (MBA). Until his appointment as CMD, he was the chairman, Medical Advisory Council (CMAC). He served as a lecturer and consultant nephrologist at the College of Medicine, University of Nigeria (UNN), and the UNTH, Ituku-Ozalla. He was the initiator and co-founder of the Consortium for Advocacy and Research, (CADRE).

== Personal life ==
Onodugo is married to Dr. Nkiruka Onodugo and they have children.
