= Inyi, Enugu State =

Inyi
- Town
- Interactive map of Inyi
- Coordinates (Nkwo Inyi): 6.1275°N 7.2934°E
- Country: Nigeria
- State: Enugu
- Local Government Area: Oji River
- Town: Inyi
- Founder: Inyi

Population
  - Estimate: 41,221
- Time zone: UTC+1 (WAT)
- Postal code: 401149
- ISO 3166 code: NG.EN.OR.IN.

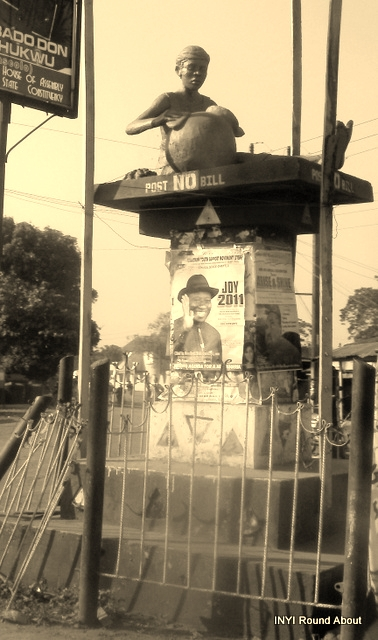
Bronze metal statue of a woman moulding a pot, erected in 1960 independence of Nigeria

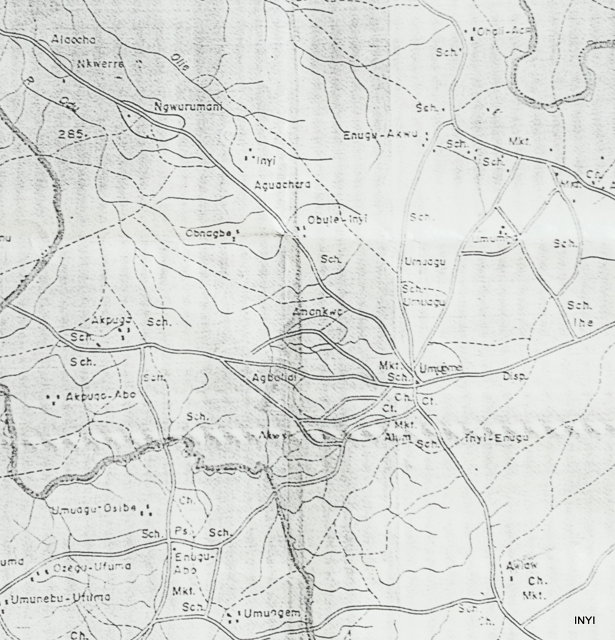
Arial map showing the various village and main roads within Inyi town

Inyi is a town in Oji River Local Government Area of Enugu State, Nigeria, approximately 60 kilometres (37 mi) from Enugu City and 35 kilometres (22 mi) from Nnewi.

The name "Inyi" refers to a metaphor, which is an essential component in the creation of proverbs. It is the Igbo name for the red water tree. Due to historical events connecting the tree and the town's founder, he was given the name, which subsequently became the town's name.

Inyi has several tourist attractions, including the Nwachighi stream, Ajala Inyi shrine, Ngene Ebenebe shrine, Okpu-ogho spring, Oji Alum Rapids, Mmam River, Ngwara River, Ngene spring water, and the Sacred Heart Church. The town is also known for its pottery and traditional crafts. Visitors can also enjoy the hospitality of the Inyi people, who are known for their love of traditional music and dance. They also have a rich tradition of pottery and traditional crafts.

The people of Inyi are primarily farmers, wine tappers, and petty traders. Women are skilled in pottery and the making of abacha varieties. Inyi people believe in God, the other gods (especially the earth deity), ancestors, and reincarnation. A popular festival in Inyi is the Ajala Inyi festival, which is held every year in October. Christmas and Easter are also celebrated in Inyi.

== Geography ==
Inyi is a town located in the Oji River Local Government Area within Enugu State in the southeastern area of Nigeria. It's about 60 kilometres (37 mi) to Enugu City, the capital of Enugu State, 45 kilometres (28 mi) to Awka, the capital of Anambra State, and 35 kilometres (22 mi) to Nnewi via Ufuma Town. Inyi lies on the eastern valley of the Mamu River. It is largely populated by members of the Igbo ethnic group, an area also known as the Waawa people. Inyi is geographically positioned approximately between latitudes 6°04′53′′ to 6°12′52′′ north of the equator and longitudes 7°11′56′′ to 7°20′08′′ east of Greenwich.

The name INYI is derived from a tree called Inyi, under which the father of inyi descendants was found and adopted. The English name for this tree is "Ordeal tree" or "red water tree". Its botanical name is Erythrophleum suaveolens.

Inyi comprises nine villages, namely:Umuome, Enugwu-Inyi, Obune, Amankwo, Agbariji, Alum, Umuagu, Nkwere, and Akwu. Recently the government of Enugu created five autonomous communities out of Inyi. These autonomous communities are Agbada-Inyi (Umuome, Obune, Amankwo and Nkwere), Ugwu-Inyi (Agbariji and Akwu), Enugwu Inyi, Alum, and Umuagu.

It is bordered by Achi, Awlaw, Akpugoeze, Ugwuoba (all in the Oji River Local Government Area) and Ufuma.

== Tourist attractions ==
Inyi has many tourist sites, including the Nwachighi stream; Ajala Inyi, Okpu-ogho, Oji Alum Rapids; Iyi oku; the Sacred Heart Church; Nkwo market, the biggest market in the town; Ngwara stream for swimmers, Ogba Anike and others. Inyi is situated centrally, with fertile arable land, clay deposit and very good people. inyi is more like a place for pottery in the earlier period though. this is also shown in the status of the woman with a pot.

== Education ==
Between 1976 and 1977, two secondary schools were built in Inyi by community effort and with approval from the State Ministry of Education, formerly Anambra. These schools are the Boys High School Inyi (now known as Model Comprehensive Boys Secondary School) and Girls Secondary School Inyi.

Today, there are many more secondary and tertiary institutions in Inyi and prominent among them is the School of Health Technology Inyi, which is a school of paramedical studies located in Enugu-Inyi.

== Culture ==
=== Food ===
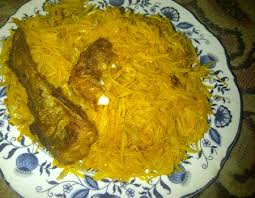
Abacha ncha made from Cassava and Palm oil etc.

Inyi people are known to be very hospitable and cheerful. They are notable for the manner in which they entertain their guests after the initial offering of kola nut (Oji) in any simple or complex gathering or event. Traditionally, Inyi people entertain their visitors by preparing their staple food, Ncha which is a delicacy, served with fish and fresh Palm wine (White Palm Sap water) gotten from local Palm wine tapping. This palm wine is noted to be beneficial to the sight with its yeast content, especially when drank in moderation, as it is also intoxicating. Inyi people enjoy the company of each other so much so that they are said to drink from the same cup without any fears or reservations. Like other parts of Enugu State, the people of Inyi are also well known for their delectable Okpa.

=== Early proverbial expressions ===
Inyi is full of early proverbial terms. "Ukagbantu mmu Inyi" (Ukagbantu that procreated Inyi) is one of them. This proverb alludes to the Inyi people's ancestry, demonstrating that Ukagbantu, who was Inyi's wife, gave birth to the Inyi people. The Inyi people made a deliberate effort to preserve that piece of history by turning it into a proverb. There is also another common proverb that refers to Inyi history. "Inyi nese omire" refers to the five very talented sons of Inyi. This proverb maintains the precise count of Inyi's direct sons for future generations. The sons' skill was the root of this. Because the five sons of Inyi displayed the traits their father had instilled in them as they matured into men. They gained notoriety and reputation as "umuinyi nese omire." An additional proverb aims to conserve a different aspect of Inyi history. It is "Agbariji na Arum wu nwanne". This means that Arum and Agbariji are brothers. According to an anthropological narrative, Agbariji, a direct son of Inyi, had an unmarried daughter who gave birth to Arum. The Inyi people live in peace and harmony, which gave rise to the adages "Inyi ji ofu iko anu mmanya" (Inyi people are content drinking together from one cup of wine) and "Inyi nw’ochucho" (the lovely ambiance of Inyi/ pax inyi). Inyi is likewise replete with wellerisms. One revolved around the awarding of the Emume Inyi abia title, also known as "Igba abia" in Igbo, to eligible Inyi men. On Nkwo market days, the investiture is typically completed. It is the highest traditional title in Inyi, approved by Ajala Inyi, the town's deity. "Obuako nwa Ezechineke shi na ihe nya jiri mara ma Inyi na agba Abia wu na nya turu okuahu, ashi na obiaha na ahia maka nowu Nkwo Abia" is the wellerism that demonstrated how the people felt about the abia title. Several well-known sayings and quotations, including the one above, are attributed to the historical figure Obuako, a sage from the vicinity of Ndikelionwu.

=== Occupation ===
The people of Inyi are primarily farmers, wine tappers and petty traders. The women are proficient in pottery and the making of abacha varieties - food items deriving from cooked cassava tubers shredded to sizes and types. It is this abacha that forms the main component of the delicacy called ncha. Inyi can be said to be the headquarters of ncha in Nigeria. A visitor is offered this delicious dish just after the presentation of kola nuts.

=== Religious beliefs ===
In pre-contact times and, for some adherents today, Inyi people believed in God (Chukwu), the other gods (especially the earth deity, Ajala) and ancestors. They also believe in reincarnation. It is the conviction that a deceased person's soul is reincarnating in a different body. It is implied that Inyi people perform burial and funeral rites for their departed kinsmen who led honorable, virtuous, and desirable lives in order to facilitate their rebirth. Inyi people believe that in order for someone to reincarnate, they had to go through the process of dying and being granted supernatural powers. Therefore, it becomes essential to perform the right burial rites in order to help the deceased reach this spiritual state.

The Inyi people prayed to aforementioned spiritual entities. For instance, Aja ala, or the earth force, had sway over the Inyi clan. An old man had shrines dedicated to ahiajoku (Yam force) and Ndu ichie (Spirits of Ancestors). An old woman kept a shrine dedicated to Chukwu Okuke, who grants children to mothers.

About 1917, Christianity came into Inyi town in the form of Church Missionary Society of the Anglican Communion and the Roman Catholic Mission.

=== Festivals ===
A popular festival among the Inyi people is called Ajala Inyi. It is held mostly in October each year. Ajala is a powerful deity in the Inyi culture. Commencing from Eke, Orie, Afor, and Nkwo, the festival spans four Market days and is as old as the Inyi people. Every year, the Ajala Inyi festival is accompanied by a masquerade display to keep the public entertained. Christianity has also introduced Christmas and Easter seasons in Inyi. Christmas is held every December 25 to celebrate the birth of Jesus Christ. Easter comes up between March and April every year. It is celebrated in remembrance of the death and resurrection of Jesus Christ. Masquerades are seen during these celebrations, signifying some sort of inter-religious influence.

=== Taboos ===
Similar to certain other cultures that prohibit certain things, the Inyi people have their own set of forbidden things. They don't eat tortoises or monkeys (though it appears the monkey taboo is observed by people from Agbaraiji village of the town). Anyone who accidentally kill the animals (and is aware of the act) will have to bury the animals.

== Weather conditions in Inyi ==
Weather conditions in Inyi consists of two major seasons, the Dry season and the Wet season (Raining season).

The dry season begins in November and extends till April, but between December and January, the days are at its driest and windy, nights and early morning are colder. This is generally referred to as the Harmattan season. The northeastern winds come often in spells that last from a few days to more than a week. Nights become chilly and temperatures may even drop below the 18 °C, coming back to an average 32 °C during the day with occasional peaks above the 36 °C during the day. The hot harmattan winds evaporate body moisture quickly and give a sensation of coolness to the skin. It is these Sahara winds that carry large amounts of dust to the state, leaving a thick fog in the morning and a hazy sky for the rest of the day behind.

However, the rain season falls between May and October with the heaviest rains in June and July during this season, the rain is mostly preceded by strong winds and skies filled with lightning and Thunder. In the absence of rain, weather is clear and cool, around 26 °C; during the day and 20 °C in the night, however humidity prevails. The annual rainfall in Enugu State is between 1.5 and 2 metres (1.6 and 2.2 yards).

== Notable personalities from Inyi ==
Some prominent Inyi people include:

- Allison Madueke, Rear admiral, former Military Governor of Anambra and Imo States of Nigeria. He later became the Head and Chief of the Naval Staff of the Nigerian Navy. His wife was a one time Minister for Petroleum Resources
- Cyril Agodi Onwumechili (First to be appointed professor from Inyi, 1962)
- Nick Ezeh First President of the Sun-Rise Club of Inyi Town

== Select bibliography on Inyi ==
A number of books and articles have been written about Inyi town. They include:

- Chukwunakpunze. C.B (2011) Rural Development; A Discourse on Inyi Town development genealogy, founders and its Health Center, paper abstract, University of Nigeria.
- Onwumechili, C.A. (2006). Inyi Home Affairs. Lagos: Omot-T Professional Printers.
- Onwumechili, C.A. (2010). Coming a Long Way: A Biographical Memoir. Massachusetts: King Printing Company.
- Animalu, AOE, Okeke, FN. & Unaegbu, J. (2011). Biography of the Eminent Pioneer Geophysicist, CYRIL AGODI ONWUMECHILI, Professor of Physics. Abuja: Ucheakonam Foundation (Nig.) Ltd.
- Unaegbu, J. (2020). "Igbo Post-Contact Proverbs of the Inyi Community", Proverbium, Vol. 37, pp. 311–340.
- Madu, P.O.B. (2010). Facts about Inyi. Lagos: Omot-T Professional Printers.
- Mberedeogu, M.O.A. (2009). Broken: The Story of Inyi: Told and Untold. np:

Sagg & Scorpio Communications.

- Mberedeogu, M. (2003): Save Inyi Town. Saga and Scorpio Communications.
- Madueke, Levi Uche. (2013). "Positioning INYI strategically to embrace the challenges of development" Being a Memorial Lecture delivered on December 29, 2013, during the formal Inauguration of Nkenke Enyi Foundation for Bright Students Scholarship at the Chief Nkem Oramalugo villa, Agbariji, Inyi, Enugu State, Nigeria.
- Udeh, M.O. (2001): History of Inyi 1900-2000. Chuka Links Pub. Enugu.
- Udeh, M.O. (2004). Inyi History: 1900-2000 (2nd Ed). Enugu: Fidgina Global Books.
- Ude, M.O. (2013): 100 Years of Church Missionary Activities in Inyi and Awlaw Regions, 1912-2012; 206+xi Pp.
- Ude, M.O. (2004): The Life and Times of Warrant Chief Udeagbara Uzoma (1899-1994), Enugu: Fidgina Global Books.
- Ejikeme, Joy Nneka U. (2021). "Traditional Burial And Funeral Practices In Inyi, Oji River Local Government Area Of Enugu State, Nigeria", IKENGA International Journal of Institute of African Studies UNN, Volume 21, No.3 83 -101.
- Ejikeme, J. N. U. (2020). Traditional Food (Ncha) and Their Potentials to Tourism Promotion among the Igbo of South-eastern, Nigeria. Nigerian Journal of Archaeology, 3(2), 17–42.
- Ejikeme, J. N. U., & Okonkwo, U. U. (2022). Sacred groves and natural sites conservation for tourism in local communities in Nigeria. African Journal of Hospitality, Tourism and Leisure, 11(6), 1878–1898. http://www.ajhtl.com
- Ezeh, C. C., Oti, U. A., Usman, A. O., & Okonkwo, A. C. (2021). Dimensional resistivity imaging of Inyi coal-field, Anambra Basin, Nigeria. Journal LA MultiApp, 02(06), 40–54. https://doi.org/10.37899/journallamultiapp.v2i6.5542
- Iyi, E.C., Ezike, E.C. & Eneh, N.D. (2022). "Sedimentary Characteristics Of Inyi Sand Deposit And Environs In Oji River, Enugu State, Southeastern Nigeria", Irish Journal of Environment and Earth Sciences, Vol. 6; Issue 4, July–August.
- Ugbor, C.C., Madu, O.C. and Eze, M.O (2023). "Integrated Geological and Geophysical Investigation for Coal Resource Estimation at Inyi and the Environs, Oji River, Enugu State, Nigeria", Journal of Mining and Geology Vol. 59 (2) 2023. pp. 217 – 232.
