= Mgbidi, Enugu State =

Town in Nigeria

Awgu
- Nickname: (Uwee-Okpoo)
- Location of Mgbidi in Nigeria
- Coordinates: 6°4′32″N 7°27′13″E
- Country: Nigeria
- State: Enugu

Mgbidi (previously known as Mgbidi and Uwee). It is one of the major Town in Awgu Local Government Area. Mgbidi host virtually all the government institutions in the area including the Council Headquarters, NYSC Orientation Camp, Awgu Divisional Police Headquarters, etc. all in Enugu State, Southeastern Nigeria. According to the 2006 Nigerian Census, the population of Mgbidi was recorded at approximately 30,253. As of 2024, estimates project the population to exceed 54,000.

== Modern history ==
Mgbidi originally was composed of 13 villages, where amalgamated when colonial government created autonomous villages.

The Anike Customary Court was formerly located at Agu-Ugwu, present day Anike LGDC Headquarters, Ezinese Mgbidi. Mgbidi as a community used to have three representatives at the court, rotating in turns matching zoning.

Mgbidi comprises two autonomous communities: Ezinese Mgbidi and Ezineri Mgbidi. These communities encompass 14 villages (Agbonato-Ogba, Amorji, Enuguife, Eziama, Ezioha, Ifite, Isiuga, Isiyi, Ofelite, Ogwugwu, Ogwumgbidi, Ududa, Ugwunato Ogba, & Uwakpu), as well as two newer sites: Awa (Ifite Ndi-Agu) and Adani (Hilltop Camp).

== Community ==
Mgbidi indigenes are predominantly Christians with major of Mgbidi people one way or the other connected to the Catholic Churches under the Awgu Catholic diocese. Mgbidi is also home to other Christian religious sects and Pentecostal Churches.

Mgbidi as a town has three Secondary Schools and numerous Primary Schools both government owned and private.

== Geography ==
Mgbidi has numerous springs, streams, and rivers. The river that runs through town runs dry between December and March every year.
