= Ugwuoba =

- Town
- Nickname: Ugwuoba
- Location of Ugwuoba in Nigeria
- Coordinates: 6°16′7″N 7°9′15″E
- Country: Nigeria
- State: Enugu State
- Local Government Area: Oji River
- 3-digit postal code prefix: 401
- ISO 3166 code: NG.EN.OR.UG.

Ugwuoba is the gateway town into Enugu State from southern Nigeria. It is a border town on the bank of Oji River in Oji River Local Government Area of Enugu State, Nigeria. Ugwuoba is known for its arable land for agricultural utilities. The town is known for its gas reserves within the gas-rich Anambra Basin, Southeastern Nigeria. There is also the popular Ugwuoba clay deposits that could serve as effective Zinc ion adsorbent. Ugwuoba is rich in cultural and social life activities. Ugwuoba is made up of seventeen (17) villages which includes: Upata, Okwe, Agungwu, Aguabosi, Mkpagu, Eziachi, Okpuno, Ude, Egbeagu, Agolo, Obinagu, Efulu, Ogbudu, Umualu, Agungwu-ogboo, Umuonwu and Aniocha. The Ojinator and Dodo community is an extension of Okwe. Ugwuoba is divided into four autonomous communities namely

1. Agulu autonomous community. Agolo village, Efulu village and Aguabosi village
2. Okpuno-Agude autonomous community. Okpuno village, Obinagu village, Eziachi village, Mkpagu village, Egbeagu, Ude village, Umuonwu village and Agungwu-ogboo village
3. Umuobuagu autonomous community. Obudu village, Umualu village and Agungwu village
4. Ugwuoba Urban autonomous community. Okwe village, Aniocha village, Upata village, Egbeagu village and settlements of Dodo and Ojinator communities ( Extension of Okwe ).

Prince Alexander Nwokeabia (Ejiamatu), is the present President General of Ugwuoba Development Union, the executive leadership of the town. Each Autonomous community is headed by a Traditional ruler and together they form the Traditional ruler council of Ugwuoba Development Union the Executive Leadership of the Town.

== Religion ==
Ugwuoba indigenes are predominantly Christians with Catholic Churches under Awka Catholic Diocese and Anglican Churches under Awka Diocese (Anglican Communion) being the dominant ones. We equally have other Christian religious sects and Pentecostals Churches in the town with very few practicing Traditional Religion.

== Education ==
Ugwuoba as a town has three Secondary Schools and numerous Primary Schools both government owned and private.

Secondary Schools in Ugwuoba;

1. Community Secondary School, Ugwuoba ( formerly Ugwuoba boys).
2. Girls High School, Ugwuoba.
3. St Theresa Secondary School Ugwuoba.

== Boundaries ==
Ugwuoba is bounded by Amansea and Ebenebe in Awka North LGA, Anambra State to West, Oji River urban on the East, Ozzu Ndiukwuenu in Orumba North LGA, Anambra State and Inyi also in Oji RiverLGA to the South and Obinofia Ndiagu in Ezeagu LGA, Enugu State to the North. The town is very close to Awka, the capital city of Anambra State. Two major federal roads passes through the middle of the Town.

== Economy ==
The people of Ugwuoba are notable farmers. Mamu Forest Reserve is an annex of the Ugwuoba land. There is a federal agricultural research settlement in Agungwu and Aguabosi villages. One of the popular markets of the town is the Ugwuoba Garki cattle market. The market is strategically located around the border of Enugu and Anambra States along the Enugu-Onitsha expressway. Afor Market Ugwuoba attracts traders from Awka, Oji-River urban, Enugu and its environs.

The town is home to Akukwa field in the OPL 907 area, first drilled by Shell in 1938–1939. Thereafter, the gas field recorded further successful drills by Shell-BP in 1955 and 1956.
