= University of Nigeria Teaching Hospital =

University Teaching Hospital in Nigeria

Geography
- Location: Ituku-Ozalla, Enugu State, Nigeria

Organisation
- Type: Teaching

Services
- Emergency department: Yes
- Beds: 500

History
- Founded: 1970

Links
- Website: unth.edu.ng
- Lists: Hospitals in Nigeria

University of Nigeria Teaching Hospital is a federal government of Nigeria teaching hospital located in Ituku-Ozalla, Enugu State, Nigeria. The current chief medical director is Obinna Onodugo.

== History ==
University of Nigeria Teaching Hospital was built in the early 20th century by the colonial administrators. After Nigeria gained independence in 1960, it changed into a general hospital. It was converted into a specialized hospital on July 1, 1970, by the east central state government. The Federal military government of Nigeria took over the hospital by decree number 23 of 1974, while leaving the management in the hands of the council of University of Nigeria. In July 1976 after the appointment of an autonomous management board, the hospital became independent. On 8 January 2007, the hospital moved to a permanent site at Ituku-Ozalla.

== Departments ==
The hospital consists of 41 main departments with three outposts namely.

- University of Nigeria Teaching Hospital, Comprehensive Health Center, Obukpa
- University of Nigeria Teaching Hospital, Comprehensive Health Center, Abagana
- University of Nigeria Teaching Hospital, Comprehensive Health Center, Isuochi

== Schools ==
The hospital consists of 9 schools.

- Post Ophthalmic Nursing
- Medical Records
- School of Nursing
- Medical Laboratory Science
- Peri-Operative Nursing
- Nurse Anaesthetists
- Cardiothoracic Nursing
- Midwifery
- Community Health

== Heads of Departments ==
S/N	POSITION	NAMES OF CURRENT OFFICERS
1	Chief Medical Director	Prof. Onodugo, Obinna
2	Chairman Medical Advisory Committee	Prof. (Mrs) Joy Eze
3	Director of Administration	Mrs. Uche Obi
4	Accident & Emergency	Prof. Tagbo Ogoun
5	Accounts and Finance	Mr. Emmanuel Ugochukwu Okoro
6	Anaesthesia	Dr. Onyekulu
7	Audit	Mrs. Oraguzie Charity Oluchi
8	CSSD	Apiakason J. I.
10	CS&T	Mazi Eze Onyimba
11	Community Medicine	Prof. Nwobi Emmanuel
12	Preventive Dentistry	Prof. Abigail Ezi Akaji
