= Mgbowo =

Mgbowo is a town in Awgu Local Government Area of Enugu State, Nigeria.

It borders Onoli Eze, Nnewe and Agboleri Mmaku. There are five villages in Mgbowo namely Alaechara, Ameta, Inyi, Ezioha and Imeama.
