= Oji River =

LGA and town in Enugu State, Nigeria

Enugu West chioma aneke Oji Urban
- LGA and towns
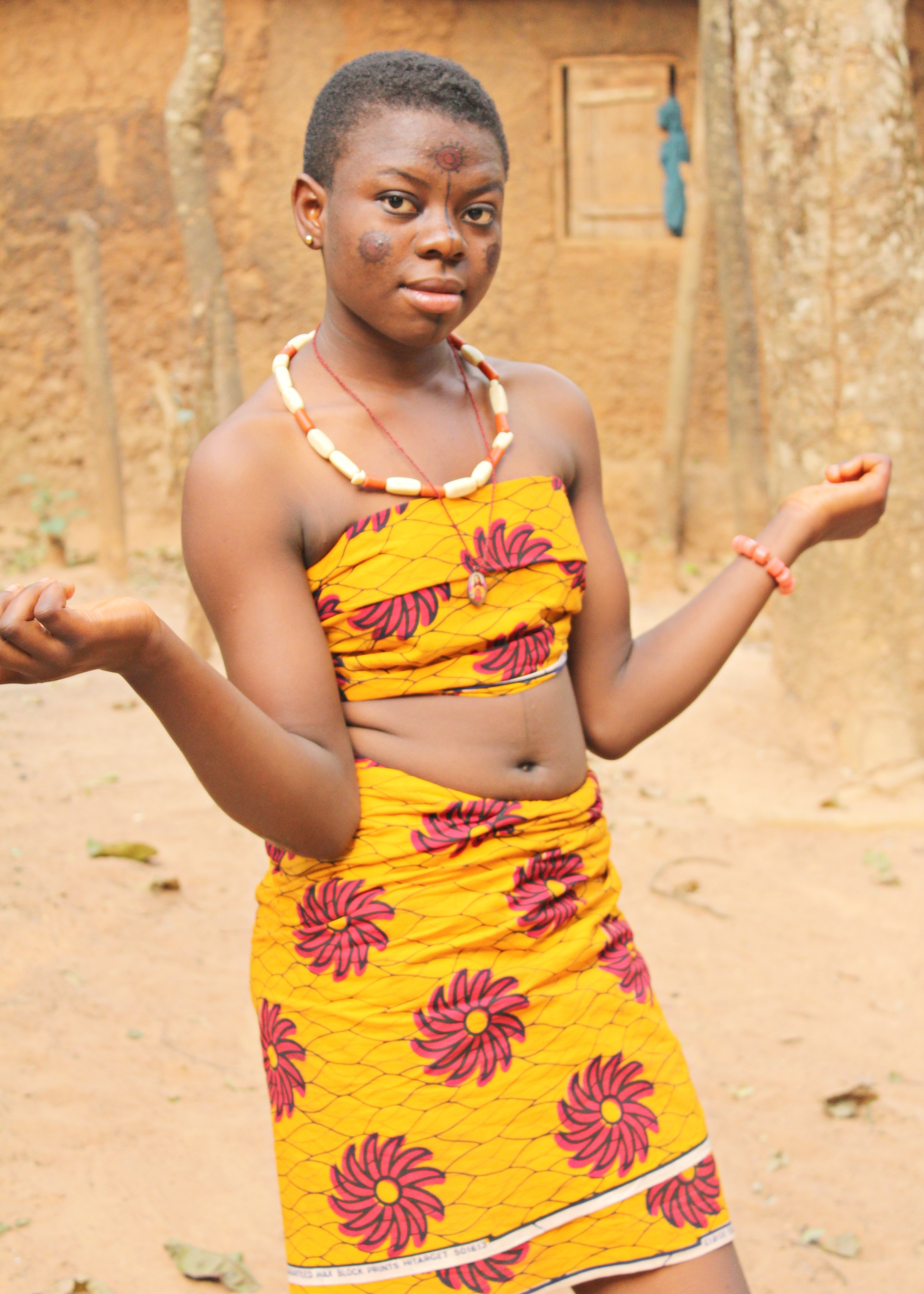
- Motto: Unity and Progress
- Interactive map of Enugu West
- Location in Nigeria
- Coordinates: 6°16′N 7°16′E
- Country: Nigeria
- State: Enugu State
- Headquarter: Iji River Urban Area

Government
  - Local Government Chairman: Hon. Greg Chijioke Anyaegbudike(PDP)

Area
  - Total: 403 km^{2} (156 sq mi)

Population (2006 census)
  - Total: 126,587
  - Density: 314/km^{2} (814/sq mi)
- Time zone: UTC+1 (WAT)
- 3-digit postal code prefix: 401
- ISO 3166 code: NG.EN.OR
- National language: Igbo

Oji River is a Local Government Area of Enugu State, Nigeria. It borders Awka North LGA in Anambra State, Umunneochi LGA in Abia State Awgu, Udi and Ezeagu LGAs in Enugu State. Its headquarters is in Oji River Urban Settlement. The towns within Oji River L.G.A include Inyi, Achi, Awlaw, Akpugoeze, and Ugwuoba.

Note that Oji River Urban is a Settlement comprising 4 wards.

Oji River LGA has an area of 403 km^{2} and a population of 126,587 at the 2006 census.

The postal code of the area is 401.

The Oji River Thermal Power Station, located in Oji River, Enugu State, Nigeria, is one of the smaller satellite power stations built in the Southeast of Nigeria before Independence in 1960, and prior to the commissioning of the large National Hydroelectricity Power Station in Kainji Dam and Jebba Dam.

It was initially built to produce a capacity of 10 MW of electricity, utilizing the river at the site and coal transported via overhead cable buckets from the Enugu Coal located 50 km away. After the Nigeria - Biafra civil war, the thermal power station was upgraded to 30MW, supplying electricity to the immediate area, as well as parts of Udi and Achi areas.

28 January 1956: Queen Elizabeth II, on a three-week visit to Nigeria, during which she visited the leper settlement and newly built power station, at Oji river in East Nigeria. The plant reportedly last generated power in 2004. The Nigerian government has debated plans for recommissioning the plant, considering that its water level has drastically gone down such that it cannot power its turbines to generate electricity, as well as the closed coal mines at Enugu city.

Oji River town has one of the largest and oldest running leprosy rehabilitation settlements in the south-east, bordering Anambra state. It had been originally set up by English missionary churches in the 1930s in Nigeria. In 1944, the then Governor of Nigeria Sir Arthur Richards visited the Uzuakoli Leper Settlement officially. Following this visit, the Nigerian government took active interest in missionary activities to eradicate leprosy in Nigeria by assisting in the Oji River Leprosy Settlement which is established and owned by the Church Missionary Society (CMS an arm of Anglican communion). It also built a Leprosy Control Centre at Oji River.

Most people from Oji River are Christians with majority either practising Catholics or Anglicans while the rest practise local beliefs.

Oji River town hosts one of only four sites nationally, for the Recruitment and training at police cadets in a Police College in Oji River, which also offered training to other security personnel, such as armed immigration officers. The Nigeria Police Force (NPF) is designated by Section 194 of the 1979 constitution as the national police of Nigeria with exclusive jurisdiction throughout the country.

== Gallery ==
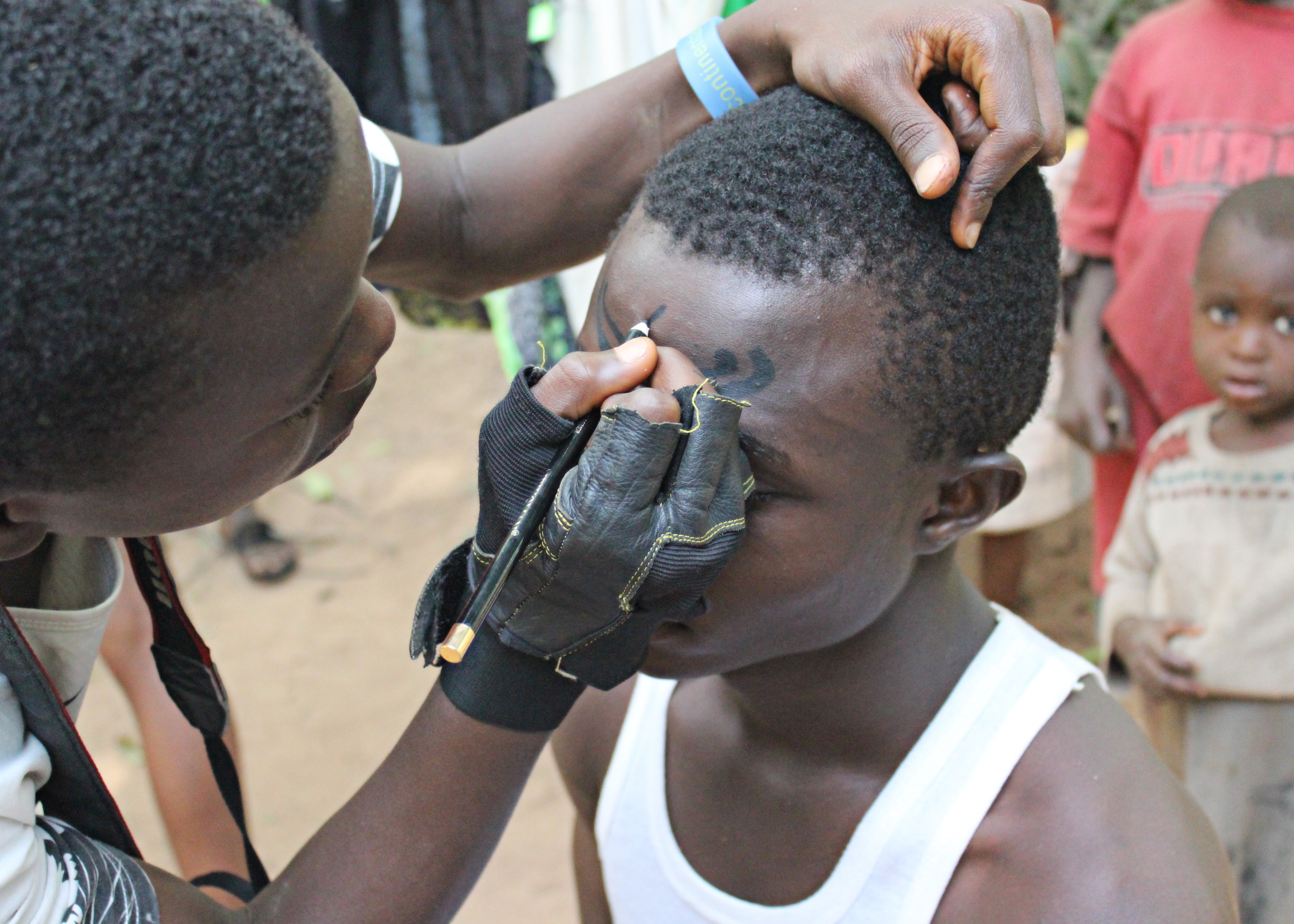
Makeup artist preparing an Atilogu dancer - Igbo Tribe - Oji River - Enugu State - Nigeria
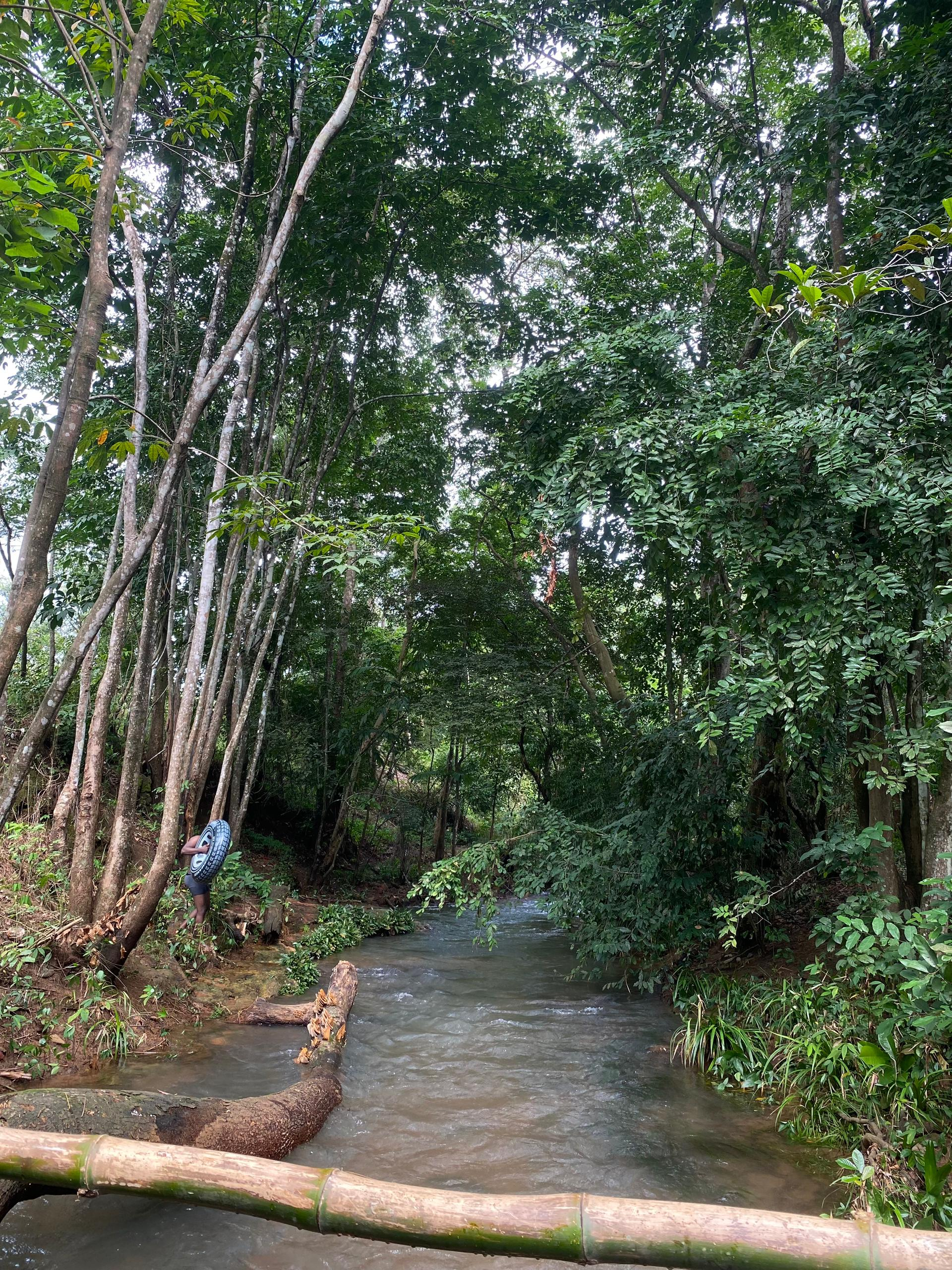
Rivulet of the Oji river flowing through the Inyi community, Identified as a class one rapid with tree covering.

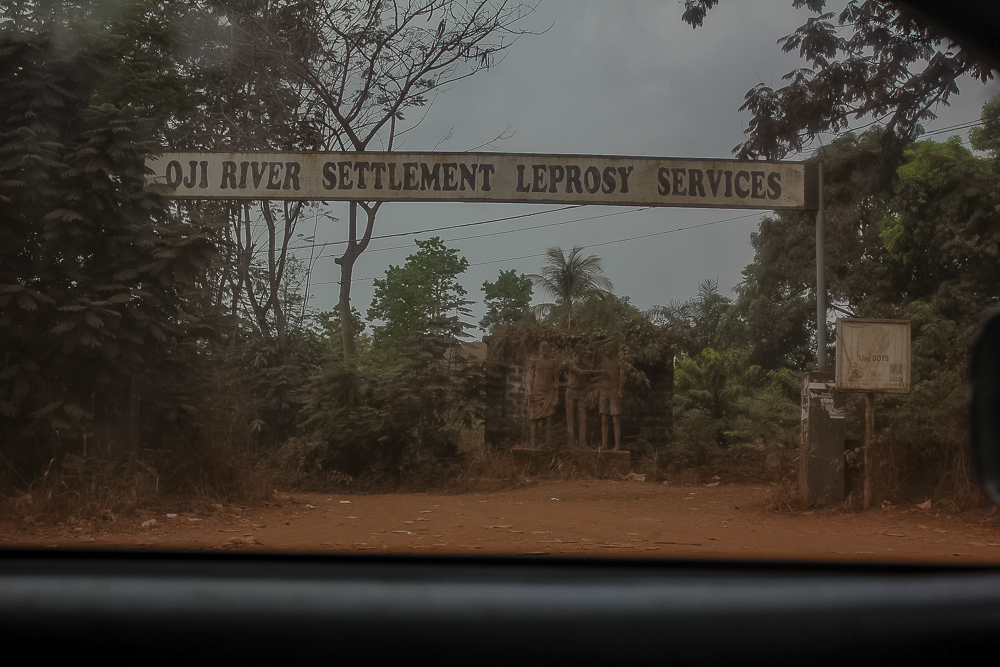
Oji river settlement leprosy service center

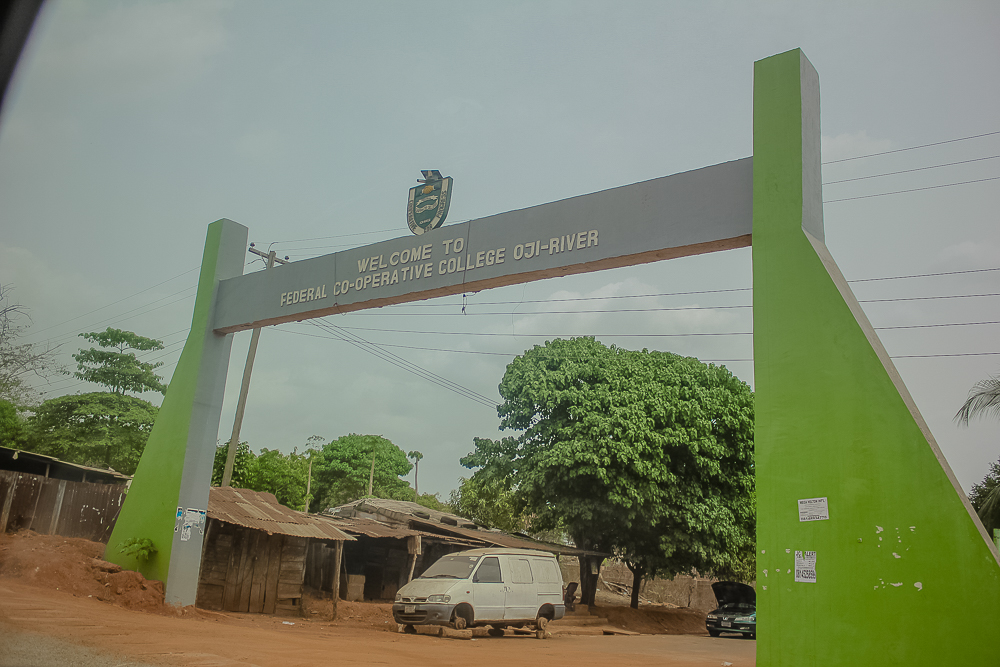
Federal cooperative college, Oji River Enugu

== Notable people ==
- Chidozie Awaziem-super eagles and former FC Porto player.
- Engineer Osita Charles Ezedozie-former director at ferma and Nigerian ministry of works.
- Kgb Oguakwa-Nigerian politician, former house of representative member.
- Kamtochukwu Igweobi-Nigerian pharmacist, founder orange drugs.
- Allison Madueke- former military governor of Lagos and IMO states.
- Late Silas Ilo-Former state minister for health.
- Populated places in Enugu State
