= Awgu =

Local Government Area and town in Enugu State, Nigeria

Coordinates: 6.1169°N 7.4760°E

Awgu Ogwu
- LGA and town
- Interactive map of Awgu
- Location in Nigeria
- Country: Nigeria
- State: Enugu State

Government
  - Type: Local Government Council
  - Chairman: Hon Uchenna Okolo(PDP)
  - Deputy Chairman (D-Mayor): Hon Dr Stanley Ezediuto (PDP)
- Highest elevation: 400 m (1,300 ft)
- Lowest elevation: 234 m (768 ft)

Population (2006)
  - Total: 390,681
- Time zone: UTC+1 (WAT)
- Postal code: 402120
- ISO 3166 code: NG.EN.AW
- National language: Igbo
- Website: www.awgu.org.ng

Awgu// is a town and Local Government Area (LGA) in Enugu State, Nigeria. It was created in 1976 from the colonial District of Awgu. St Michael's Catholic Cathedral is located in Awgu Catholic Diocese. The Catholic Cathedral is said to resemble a spaceship when viewed with Google Earth. The biggest market in the local council area is the Orie Awgu Market, notable for its rich source of agricultural and food items. The market also serves communities of the neighbouring states. The town is also the Orientation Training Centre for National Youth Service corps members posted to Enugu State hosted on the Crown land of Awgu Town (the hilltop land).

== Health centres ==
The University of Nigeria Teaching Hospital which is a foremost tertiary hospital in Africa and is located in Awgu LGA. The hospital was established in the 1970s and notable for its resounding feats in the field of cardio thoracic surgeries and for this reason, the Federal Ministry of Health Nigeria designated it a cardio-thoracic centre in the country. Colocated with the hospital is the University of Nigeria College of Medicine which is a centre of excellence for training medical doctors, dentists and healthcare professionals. The local government area also boasts of a School of Nursing and Midwifery located in Awgu Town.

Other healthcare facilities in Awgu are District Hospital Awgu, Beacon Hospital, Jideofor Hospital, St Anns Hospital, Chimaroke Nnamani Cottage Hospital Onoli Awgu and Primary Health Center Onoli Awgu.

== History ==
The present Awgu LGA was created out of the greater Awgu Local government area which included Aninri and Oji River local government areas. It has a population of 390,681, according to the 2006 census. Out of this, 95,421 are males while 102,713 are females. The distribution of population is uneven; a few areas are densely populated while many other areas are virtually uninhabitable. Majority of the population settle at the foot of the hills because of the difficulty posed by the rugged terrain and because the lowland have richer soil which support better crop yield. A study by Mozie, Arinze T. at the Department of Geography, University of Nigeria found that the settlement pattern on the hills is clustered with a nearest neighbour index of 0.82 while settlement pattern on the lowland area is dispersed with a nearest neighbour index of 1.72.

== Geography ==
Awgu is marked by extensive hills, especially on the western flank, and lowland in the eastern side. These hills have steep slopes and could attain an altitude of about 350–400 metres (1,150–1,310 feet) above sea level with mean slope angle of 15^{o} and a modal class of 11^{o}. The area is marked by shales, sandstones, and escarpment. Awgu formation is composed of bluish and gray, well-bedded shales which are occasionally intercalated with calcareous sandstones and shelly limestone. Also, fine to coarse grained, massive sandstone, locally cross-bedded with some pebble beds and subordinate bands of siltstone and carbonaceous shale are present. The Awgu formation is the youngest of the folded sequence in the Igbo land (Southeastern Nigeria).

Awgu is drained mainly by seasonal finger-like springs and streams. They dry up during the dry season (November- March) and yield more water in the wet season (April to October). Most of the streams obtain their source from the top of the hills and flow downhill. In the rainy season runoffs are collected by the streams thereby increasing their volume and velocity. Due to the muddy nature of the streams channels, the water is usually colored after heavy downpour. The streams carry a lot of debris as they flow from their source (hill top) to the settlement areas down hill (lower course). The stream load (debris) makes the water dirty, and therefore not suitable for domestic use. Many people that reside at the very lower course of the streams are affected and they have to trek up to the middle course (foot of the hills) to collect water. The area lies within the guinea Savannah vegetation zone. Vegetation in the study area varies with topography. Natural vegetation is denser in the valley and sparse at the top of the hills. Graminoids cover the area while trees are dominant on the plain. The top and slope faces of the hills are more covered by grasses such as Andropogon gayanus, Ctenium spp, Hyparrhenia barteri, etc. The common tree species found are Isoberlina doka, Anona senegalensis, etc. This pattern of vegetation has been ascribed to relative dryness during the dry season, favourable soil conditions, and human interference in bush burning. On the hills, shattered sites have trees dominating in colonies, and that, these colonies in shattered sites are characterized by favorable soils and soil water holding capacity.

Geographically, Awgu LGA is located approximately between latitudes 06 00’ and 06 19’ North of the Equator and longitudes 07 23’ and 07 35’ East of the Greenwich Meridian. Awgu LGA is bounded in the north by Udi and Nkanu West LGAs, in the west by Oji River LGA, Aninri LGA and Ivo LGA of Ebonyi State in the East, and shares borders with Umunneochi LGA of Abia State in the South. Communities in Awgu south constituency are Awgu, Mmakụ, Mgbowo, among others. Awgu north constituency has Agbogugu, Ogugu, among others.

== Economy ==
The major economic activity for majority of the population is subsistence farming and crops such as cassava, yam, cocoyam, vegetables, maize, oil bean, breadfruit etc. are grown. Bush fallowing, mixed cropping and shifting cultivation are some of their farming practices. Livestock rearing is also common among some of the people. Palm wine extraction and stone quarrying are other economic activities also undertaken in Awgu. The major market in Awgu LGA is the Oye market. Various farm products are traded in the market on wholesale and retail basis every four days. Many of the people take their farm produce to sell in the market in exchange for other commodities they cannot produce. People from Nkanu and Enugu urban also patronize the traders in this market especially for cassava and vegetables.

== Climate ==
With temperatures ranging from 65 °F to 88 °F and infrequently dropping below 58 °F or rising over 91 °F, the environment has a warm, oppressive rainy season and a hot, muggy, partly cloudy dry season.
