= 2023 Nigerian gubernatorial elections =

- 18 March and 11 November 2023

31 governorships
	Majority party	Minority party	Third party
Party	APC	PDP	APGA
Seats before	21	14	1
Seats up	19	12	0
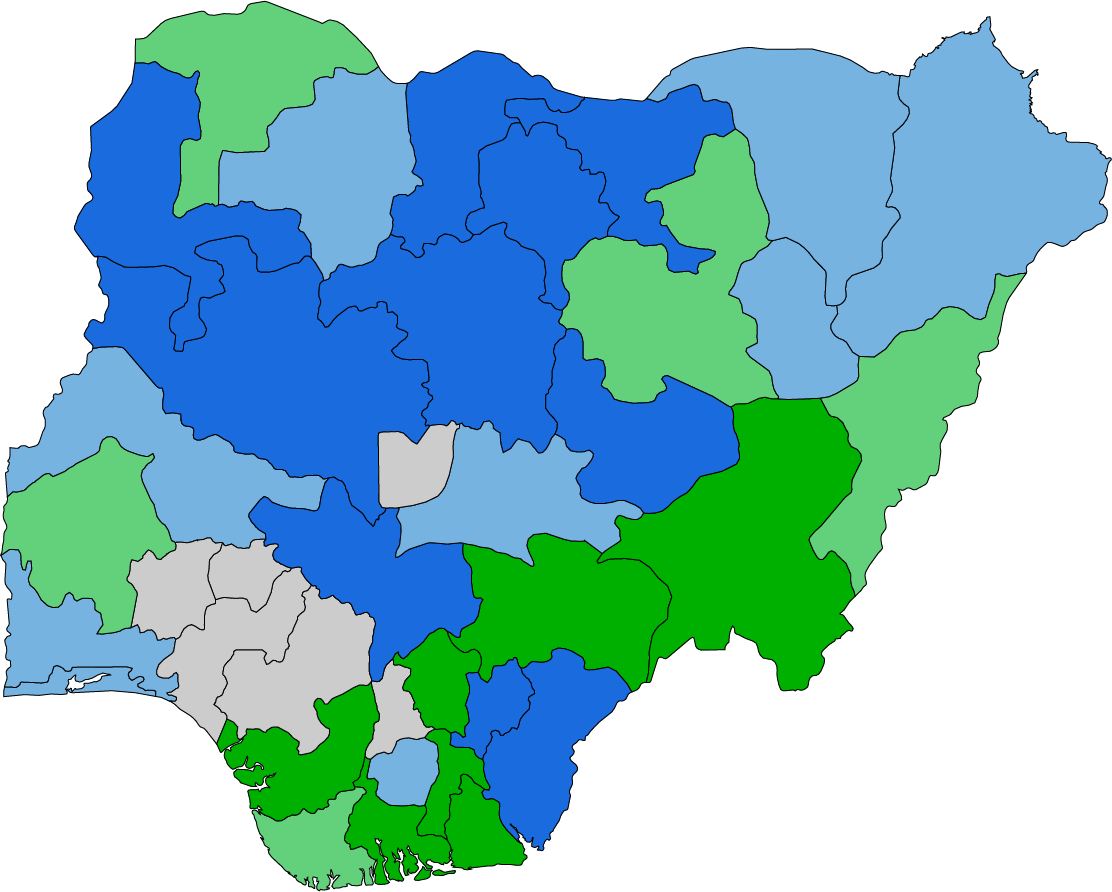
- APC incumbent term-limited APC incumbent running or eligible for re-election PDP incumbent term-limited PDP incumbent running or eligible for re-election No election in 2023

The 2023 Nigerian gubernatorial elections were held for state governors in 31 out of 36 Nigerian states. All but three elections were held on 18 March—concurrent with elections to every state house of assembly, three weeks after the presidential election and National Assembly elections—while the Imo State, Kogi State, and Bayelsa State elections will be held on 11 November. The last regular gubernatorial elections for all states were in 2019. All states have a two term limit for Governors which makes 18 incumbent governors ineligible for re-election.

Several incumbent governors were ineligible for re-election due to term limits. Nine APC governors were term-limited while nine incumbent APC governors were eligible for re-election. Among PDP governors, eight were term-limited while four could seek re-election. Elections will be held in 18 of the 20 states with APC governors and 12 of the 14 states with PDP governors.

The APC and PDP picked up two governorships each in the March elections, with the APC winning Benue and Sokoto while the PDP gained Plateau and Zamfara. Additionally, both the LP and NNPP gained one governorship with the LP gaining Abia and the NNPP flipping Kano. Two gubernatorial races—Adamawa and Kebbi—were declared inconclusive due to close margins and results cancellations.

Overall, the March election results were noted for few changes as state's governing parties generally retained control of governorships. Like in the federal elections, Independent National Electoral Commission performance dominated post-election discussion as dozens of candidates claimed irregularities had impacted their elections. Additionally, the March gubernatorial elections had significantly more reports of violence and vote-buying than during the federal elections, especially in the states of Lagos and Kano.

== Prior partisan composition ==
Before the elections, there were 21 APC governors, 14 PDP governors, and one APGA governor. Of the governor's offices up for election in 2023, 19 are held by an APC member while 12 are held by a PDP member.

== Results summary ==
State	Incumbent			Results	
State	Incumbent	Party	First elected	Status	Candidates
Abia	Okezie Ikpeazu	PDP	2015	Incumbent term-limited New governor elected LP gain	▌ ✓ Alex Otti (LP); ▌Ikechi Emenike (APC); ▌Gregory Ibe (APGA); ▌Uche Ikonne (PDP)
Adamawa	Ahmadu Umaru Fintiri	PDP	2019	Incumbent re-elected	▌ ✓ Ahmadu Umaru Fintiri (PDP) 50.46%; ▌Aishatu Dahiru Ahmed (APC) 46.71%
Akwa Ibom	Udom Gabriel Emmanuel	PDP	2015	Incumbent term-limited New governor elected PDP hold	▌ ✓ Umo Eno (PDP) 53.98%; ▌Bassey Albert Akpan (YPP) 20.76%; ▌Akan Udofia (APC) 19.74%
Bauchi	Bala Mohammed	PDP	2019	Incumbent re-elected	▌ ✓ Bala Mohammed (PDP) 50.78%; ▌Sadique Abubakar (APC) 41.79%; ▌Halliru Dauda Jika (NNPP) 5.85%
Bayelsa	Douye Diri	PDP	2019	Eligible	TBD
Benue	Samuel Ortom	PDP	2015	Incumbent term-limited New governor elected APC gain	▌ ✓ Hyacinth Alia (APC) 62.61%; ▌Titus Uba (PDP) 29.58%; ▌Herman Hembe (LP) 5.53%
Borno	Babagana Umara Zulum	APC	2019	Incumbent re-elected	▌ ✓ Babagana Umara Zulum (APC) 86.10%; ▌Mohammed Ali Jajari (PDP) 12.96%
Cross River	Benedict Ayade	APC (Note: Ayade was elected and reelected as a member of the PDP but switched to the APC in 2021.)	2015	Incumbent term-limited New governor elected APC hold	▌ ✓ Bassey Otu 57.23% (APC); ▌Sandy Ojang Onor (PDP) 39.75%
Delta	Ifeanyi Okowa	PDP	2015	Incumbent term-limited New governor elected PDP hold	▌ ✓ Sheriff Oborevwori (PDP) 52.43%; ▌Ovie Omo-Agege (APC) 34.96%; ▌Ken Pela (LP) 6.99%
Ebonyi	Dave Umahi	APC (Note: Umahi was elected and reelected as a member of the PDP but switched to the APC in 2020.)	2015	Incumbent term-limited New governor elected APC hold	▌ ✓ Francis Nwifuru (APC) 58.13%; ▌Ifeanyichukwu Odii (PDP) 23.41%; ▌Bernard Odoh (APGA) 15.24%
Enugu	Ifeanyi Ugwuanyi	PDP	2015	Incumbent term-limited New governor elected PDP hold	▌ ✓ Peter Mbah (PDP) 44.88%; ▌Chijioke Edeoga (LP) 43.95%; ▌Frank Nweke (APGA) 5.02%; ▌Uche Nnaji (APC) 4.07%
Gombe	Muhammad Inuwa Yahaya	APC	2019	Incumbent re-elected	▌ ✓ Muhammad Inuwa Yahaya (APC) 56.63%; ▌Mohammed Jibrin (PDP) 38.51%
Imo	Hope Uzodinma	APC	2020 (Note: Emeka Ihedioha of the PDP was originally elected Governor; however, a January 2020 Supreme Court judgement awarded the win to the APC's Hope Uzodinma after Ihedioha had governed for over seven months.)	Eligible	TBD
Jigawa	Mohammed Badaru Abubakar	APC	2015	Incumbent term-limited New governor elected APC hold	▌ ✓ Umar Namadi (APC) 59.89%; ▌Mustapha Sule Lamido (PDP) 35.71%; ▌Aminu Ibrahim Ringim (NNPP) 3.60%
Kaduna	Nasir Ahmad el-Rufai	APC	2015	Incumbent term-limited New governor elected APC hold	▌ ✓ Uba Sani (APC) 47.20%; ▌Isah Ashiru (PDP) 46.49%; ▌Jonathan Asake (LP) 3.77%
Kano	Abdullahi Umar Ganduje	APC	2015	Incumbent term-limited New governor elected NNPP gain	▌ ✓ Abba Kabir Yusuf (NNPP) 51.55%; ▌Nasir Yusuf Gawuna (APC) 45.03%
Katsina	Aminu Bello Masari	APC	2015	Incumbent term-limited New governor elected APC hold	▌ ✓ Dikko Umaru Radda (APC) 62.96%; ▌Garba Yakubu Lado (PDP) 35.63%
Kebbi	Abubakar Atiku Bagudu	APC	2015	Incumbent term-limited New governor elected APC hold	▌ ✓ Nasir Idris (APC) 52.37%; ▌Aminu Bande (PDP) 46.19%
Kogi	Yahaya Bello	APC	2015 (Note: In 2015, APC's candidate Abubakar Audu won the Kogi gubernatorial election but died shortly afterwards. As runner-up in the APC primary, Yahaya Bello was declared Governor-elect.)	Incumbent term-limited	TBD
Kwara	AbdulRahman AbdulRazaq	APC	2019	Incumbent re-elected	▌ ✓ AbdulRahman AbdulRazaq (APC) 59.38%; ▌Shuaib Abdullahi Yaman (PDP) 33.77%; ▌Hakeem Lawal (SDP) 3.02%
Lagos	Babajide Sanwo-Olu	APC	2019	Incumbent re-elected	▌ ✓ Babajide Sanwo-Olu (APC) 65.95%; ▌Gbadebo Rhodes-Vivour (LP) 27.03%; ▌Abdul-Azeez Olajide Adediran (PDP) 5.40%
Nasarawa	Abdullahi Sule	APC	2019	Incumbent re-elected	▌ ✓ Abdullahi Sule (APC) 53.10%; ▌David Ombugadu (PDP) 43.28%
Niger	Abubakar Sani Bello	APC	2015	Incumbent term-limited New governor elected APC hold	▌ ✓ Mohammed Umar Bago (APC) 53.82%; ▌Isah Liman Kantigi (PDP) 44.38%
Ogun	Dapo Abiodun	APC	2019	Incumbent re-elected	▌ ✓ Dapo Abiodun (APC) 42.83%; ▌Oladipupo Olatunde Adebutu (PDP) 40.67%; ▌Olubiyi Otegbeye (ADC) 14.69%
Oyo	Seyi Makinde	PDP	2019	Incumbent re-elected	▌ ✓ Seyi Makinde (PDP) 63.37%; ▌Teslim Folarin (APC) 28.86%; ▌Adebayo Adelabu (A) 4.31%
Plateau	Simon Lalong	APC	2015	Incumbent term-limited New governor elected PDP gain	▌ ✓ Caleb Mutfwang (PDP) 48.62%; ▌Nentanwe Yilwatda (APC) 44.55%; ▌Patrick Dakum (LP) 5.58%
Rivers	Ezenwo Nyesom Wike	PDP	2015	Incumbent term-limited New governor elected PDP hold	▌ ✓ Siminalayi Fubara (PDP) 62.53%; ▌Tonye Cole (APC) 19.69%; ▌Magnus Abe (SDP) 9.71%; ▌Beatrice Itubo (LP) 4.59%
Sokoto	Aminu Tambuwal	PDP	2015	Incumbent term-limited New governor elected APC gain	▌ ✓ Ahmad Aliyu (APC) 52.48%; ▌Saidu Umar (PDP) 46.81%
Taraba	Darius Ishaku	PDP	2015	Incumbent term-limited New governor elected PDP hold	▌ ✓ Emmanuel Bwacha (APC); ▌Agbu Kefas (PDP)
Yobe	Mai Mala Buni	APC	2019	Incumbent re-elected	▌ ✓ Mai Mala Buni (APC) 71.33%; ▌Sharif Abdullahi (PDP) 27.95%
Zamfara	Bello Matawalle	APC (Note: Matawalle was elected as a member of the PDP but switched to the APC in 2021.)	2019	Incumbent lost re-election New governor elected PDP gain	▌ ✓ Dauda Lawal (PDP); ▌Bello Matawalle (APC)

== Abia State ==
2023 Abia State gubernatorial election
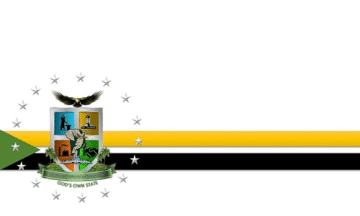
- 18 March 2023
- Opinion polls
- Registered: 2,120,808
Nominee	Alex Otti	Okey Ahiwe	Enyinnaya Nwafor
Party	LP	PDP	YPP
Running mate	Ikechukwu Emetu	Jasper Uche	Chima Anyaso
Popular vote	175,467	88,529	28,972
Nominee	Ikechi Emenike	Gregory Ibe
Party	APC	APGA
Running mate	Gloria Akara	Obinna Ichita
Popular vote	24,091	18,119
Governor before election
Okezie Ikpeazu
PDP
Elected Governor
Alex Otti
LP

Incumbent PDP Governor Okezie Ikpeazu was re-elected to a second term in 2019 with 60.26% of the vote. He was term-limited in 2023 and could not seek re-election for a third term.

=== Primaries ===
For the APC, two parallel primaries were held with one faction holding an indirect primary at the Chidiebere Arena while the other faction held a direct primary (citing a national APC directive for a direct primary in Abia) that carried on into the next day. After both primaries were peacefully held, the Chidiebere Arena primary ended in economist Ikechi Emenike winning by a wide margin while the direct primary resulted in a victory for former minister Uche Ogah. INEC recognised Emenike as the legitimate nominee in July 2022 after a court ruled in his favour.

In the APGA primary, Gregory Ibe (an academic administrator) defeated his three opponents with around 54% of the delegates' votes. While the party accepted his nomination, second runner-up Ijioma Nwokoro Ijioma rejected the results.

In the PDP primary, Uche Ikonne (an optometrist and academic administrator) emerged victorious after almost all of his opponents withdrew on the day of the primary. Reasons for withdrawal were split between those claimed that Ikpeazu's tacit support for Ikonne along with doctored delegate lists removed any fairness from the primary and those that dropped out to support Ikonne. Ikonne defeated the two remaining candidates with over 80% of the vote in an indirect primary on 25 May.

== Adamawa State ==
2023 Adamawa State gubernatorial election
- 18 March 2023
- Registered: 2,196,566
- Turnout: 39.90% (Note: This figure is based on 876,387 (the number of accredited voters); 869,106 voters (39.57%) cast votes (validly or invalidly) while 853,819 voters (38.87%) cast valid votes. Another turnout metric used by INEC is based on Permanent Voter Card-holding voters: either the percent of Permanent Voter Card-holding voters that were accredited to vote (44.47%) or the percent of Permanent Voter Card-holding voters that cast a vote—either validly or invalidly (44.10%); also used is the percent of Permanent Voter Card-holding voters that cast valid votes (43.33%).)
Nominee	Ahmadu Umaru Fintiri	Aishatu Dahiru Ahmed
Party	PDP	APC
Running mate	Kaletapwa Farauta	Titsi Ganama
Popular vote	430,861	398,788
Percentage	50.46%	46.71%
- LGA results Fintiri: 40–50% 50–60% 60–70% 70–80% Ahmed: 50–60% 60–70%
Governor before election
Ahmadu Umaru Fintiri
PDP
Elected Governor
Ahmadu Umaru Fintiri
PDP

Incumbent PDP Governor Ahmadu Umaru Fintiri was elected to a first term in 2019 with 43.22% of the vote. He is eligible to run for re-election and has been renominated by his party.

=== Primaries ===
For the APC, Aishatu Dahiru Ahmed—Senator for Adamawa Central—won the primary with 42% of delegates' votes. Despite some controversies during the primary, Ahmed was accepted as the nominee and made history as the first women to nominated by a major party for the Adamawa governorship and only the second women ever nominated by a major party for any state governorship.

In the PDP primary, Fintiri was the sole candidate due to the disqualification of his only primary opponent—Jameel Abubakar Waziri. As he was unopposed, Fintiri won unanimously at the primary in Yola.

== Akwa Ibom State ==
2023 Akwa Ibom State gubernatorial election
- 18 March 2023
- Registered: 2,357,418
Nominee	Umo Eno	Bassey Albert Akpan	Akanimo Udofia
Party	PDP	YPP	APC
Running mate	Akon Eyakenyi	Asuquo Amba	Victor Antai
Popular vote	354,348	136,262	129,602
Percentage	55.02%	21.16%	20.12%
Governor before election
Udom Gabriel Emmanuel
PDP
Elected Governor
Umo Eno
PDP

Incumbent PDP Governor Udom Gabriel Emmanuel was re-elected to a second term in 2019 with 74.64% of the vote. He will be term-limited in 2023 and cannot seek re-election for a third term.

=== Primaries ===
For the APC, months of a party crisis between a national party-recognized faction backed by Godswill Akpabio and an INEC-recognized faction backed by John James Akpan Udo-Edehe culminated in street fights over control of official voting materials. Eventually, the Akpabio faction gained control of the materials and held its primary on 27 May with businessman Akanimo Udofia winning. However, INEC did not recognize Udofia's win, leaving the APC without a gubernatorial nominee. As the APC failed to legitimately nominate a candidate, minor parties' nominees have become major candidates as Udo-Edehe decamped to the NNPP to become its nominee with rumors that losing PDP candidates are also looking at minor parties' tickets.

In the PDP primary, Umo Eno (a former commissioner) emerged victorious after two of his major opponents—Senator Bassey Albert Akpan and MHR Onofiok Luke—withdrew on the day of the primary as both claimed that a court order prevented the primary from taking place. Eno defeated the remaining candidates with over 97% of the vote in an indirect primary on 25 May.

== Bauchi State ==
2023 Bauchi State gubernatorial election
- 18 March 2023
- Registered: 2,749,268
- Turnout: 38.50% (Note: This figure is based on the number of accredited voters (1,058,381); 1,049,600 voters (38.18%) cast votes (validly or invalidly) while 1,034,379 voters (37.62%) cast valid votes. Another turnout metric used by INEC is based on Permanent Voter Card-holding voters: either the percent of Permanent Voter Card-holding voters that were accredited to vote (38.89%) or the percent of Permanent Voter Card-holding voters that cast a vote—either validly or invalidly (38.56%); also used is the percent of Permanent Voter Card-holding voters that cast valid votes (38.00%).)
Nominee	Bala Mohammed	Sadique Abubakar	Halliru Dauda Jika
Party	PDP	APC	NNPP
Running mate	Muhammad Auwal Jatau	Shehu Aliyu Musa	Dahuwa Mohammed Gadauji
Popular vote	525,280	432,272	60,496
Percentage	50.78%	41.79%	5.85%
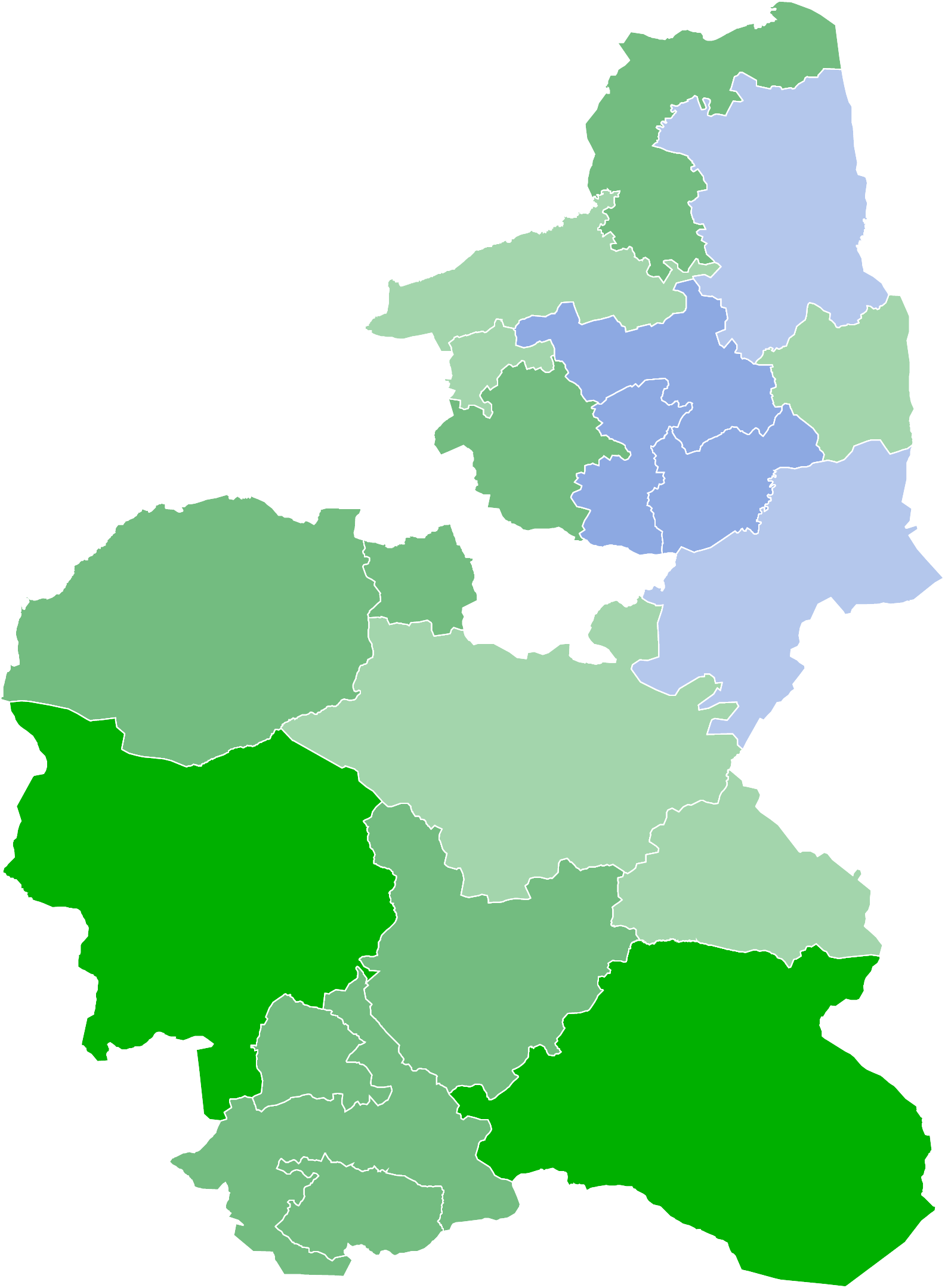
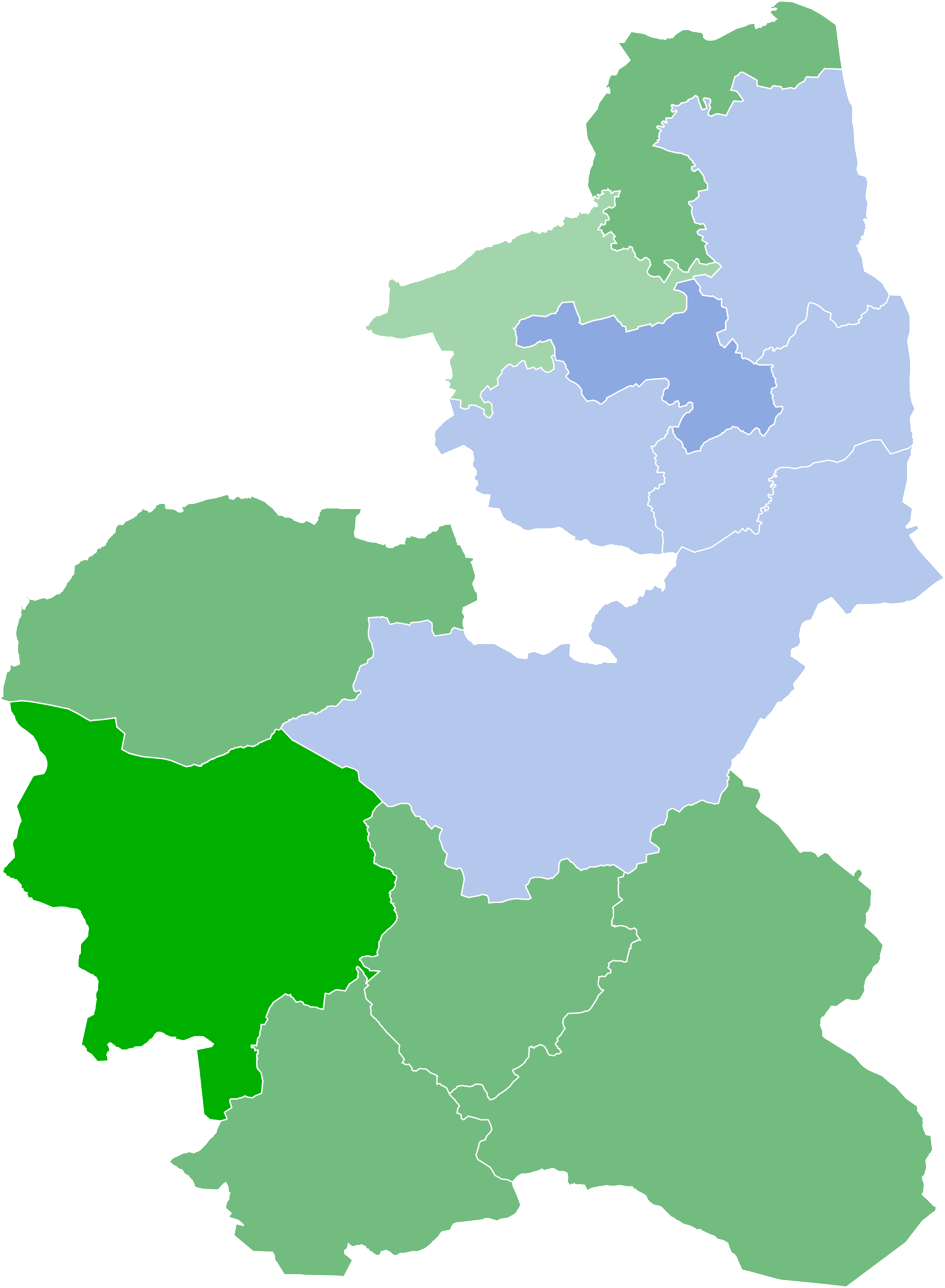
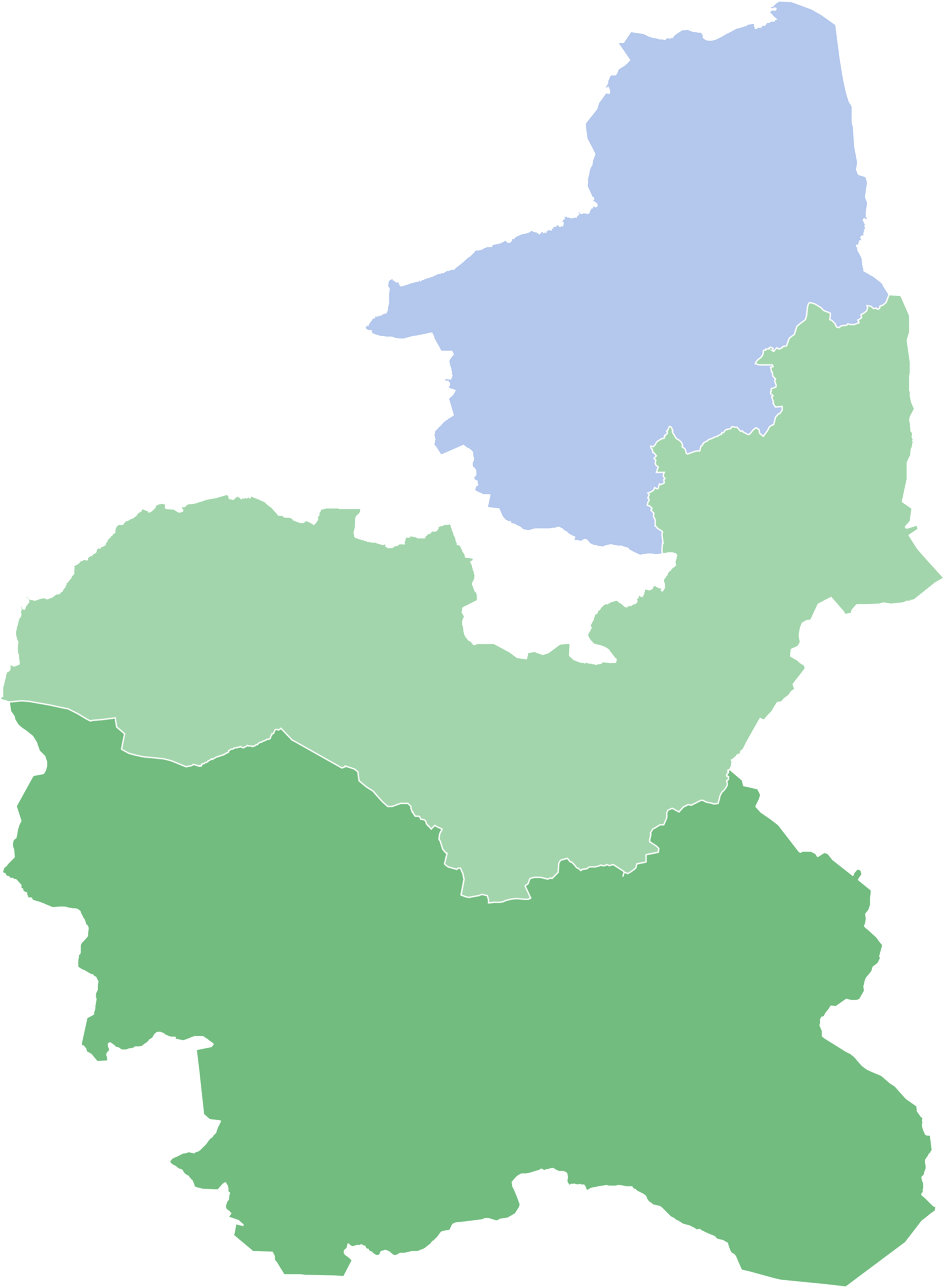
- LGA results Abubakar: 40–50% 50–60% Mohammed: 40–50% 50–60% 60–70%
Governor before election
Bala Mohammed
PDP
Elected Governor
Bala Mohammed
PDP

Incumbent PDP Governor Bala Mohammed was elected to a first term in 2019 with 46.35% of the vote. He initially declined to run for re-election, instead running for president. However, after losing the PDP presidential primary in May 2022, Mohammed was renominated for governor in a rerun primary.

=== Primaries ===
In the APC primary, Sadique Abubakar (former Chief of the Air Staff) defeated Senator Halliru Dauda Jika with 36% of the vote in an indirect primary on 26 May. Jika left for the NNPP a few weeks after the primary.

In the PDP, former Secretary to the State Government Ibrahim Kashim won the primary unopposed on 25 May. However, prior to the primary, reporting revealed that Kashim was to act as a placeholder and would withdraw if Mohammed's presidential campaign failed. After it did, Kashim withdrew and Mohammed won the rerun primary on 4 June unopposed.

== Bayelsa State ==
2023 Bayelsa State gubernatorial election
- 11 November 2023
Nominee	Douye Diri	Timipre Sylva
Party	PDP	APC
Running mate	Lawrence Ewhrudjakpo	Joshua Maciver
Popular vote	175,196	110,108
Percentage	60.93%	38.29%
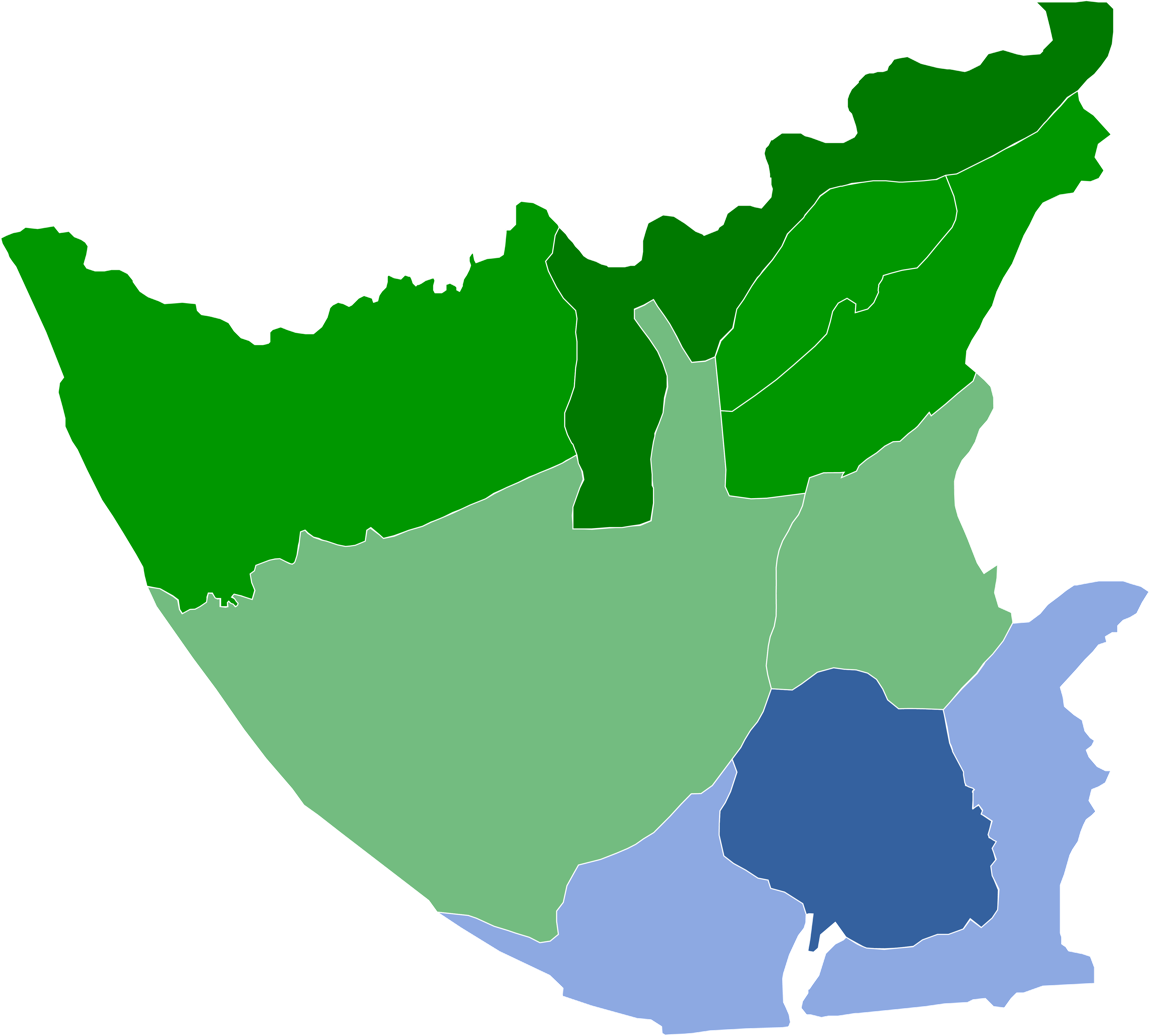
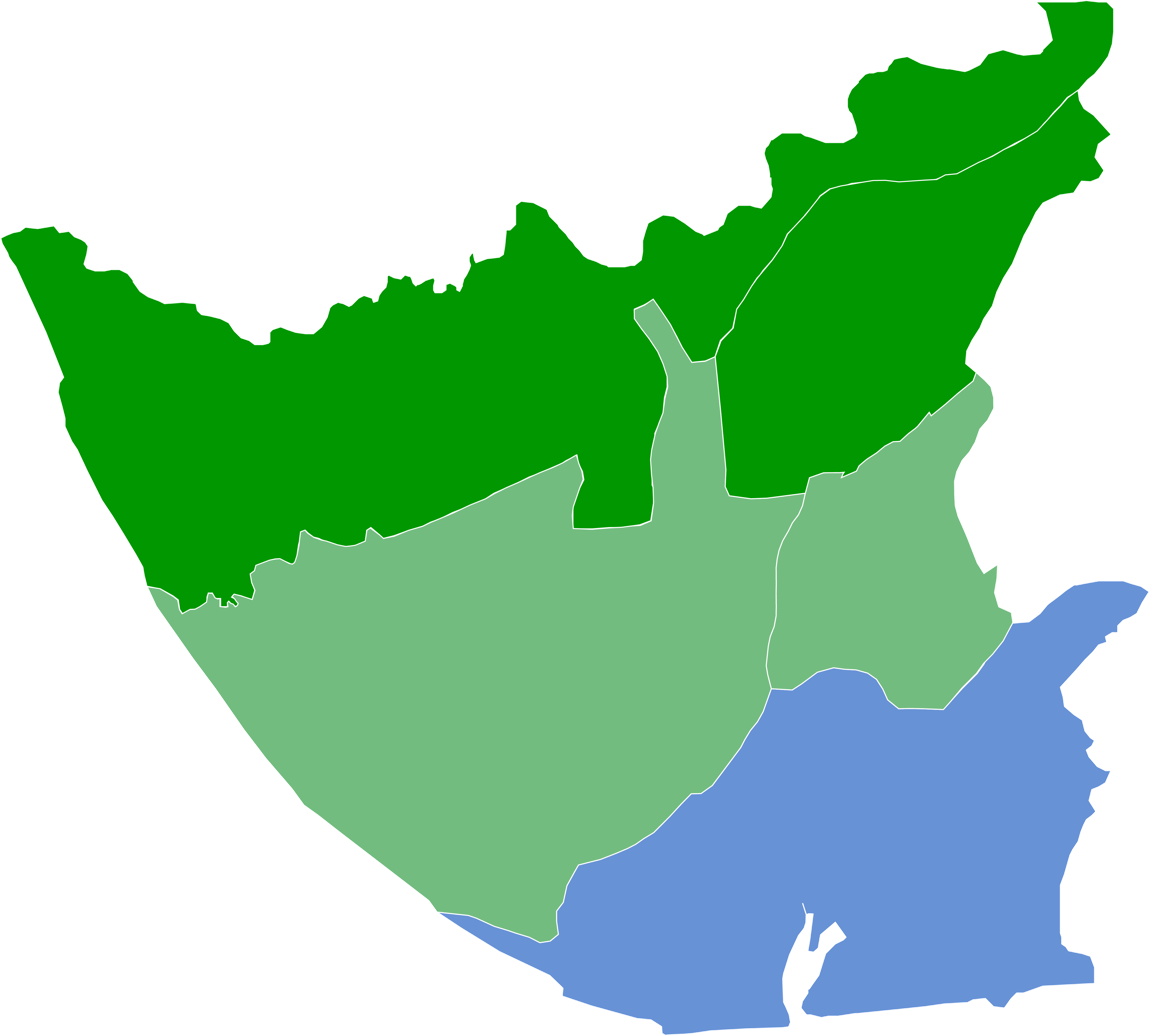
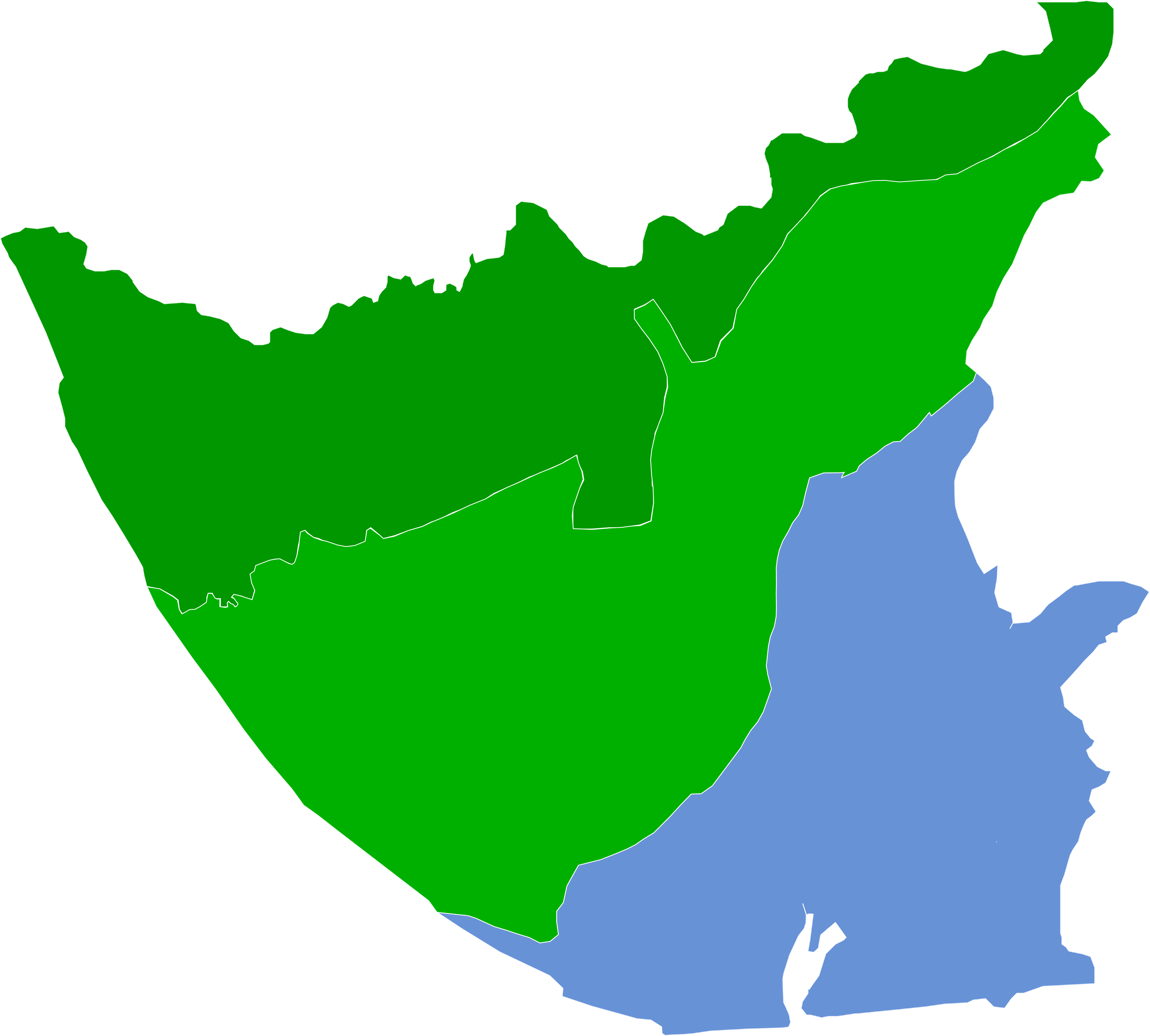
- Sylva: 50–60% 60–70% 70–80% 80–90% Diri: 50–60% 60–70% 70–80% 80–90%
Governor before election
Douye Diri
PDP
Elected Governor
Douye Diri
PDP

Incumbent PDP Governor Douye Diri was elected to a first term in 2019 after a court decision. He is eligible to run for re-election, but has not yet stated whether he will do so. A rumored PDP primary challenger for Diri is former NDDC Managing Director/CEO and 2019 PDP gubernatorial candidate Timi Alaibe.

Rumored APC candidates include Timipre Sylva (former Governor and Minister of State for Petroleum Resources), Peremobowei Ebebi (former Deputy Governor and 2020 Bayelsa West senatorial by-election nominee), David Lyon (2019 APC gubernatorial nominee), and Heineken Lokpobiri (former Minister of State for Agriculture and Rural Development and former Senator for Bayelsa West).

== Benue State ==
2023 Benue State gubernatorial election
- 18 March 2023
- Registered: 2,777,727
Nominee	Hyacinth Alia	Titus Uba	Herman Hembe
Party	APC	PDP	LP
Running mate	Samuel Ode	John Ngbede	Christopher Onyiloyi Idu
Popular vote	473,933	223,913	41,881
Percentage	62.61%	29.58%	5.53%
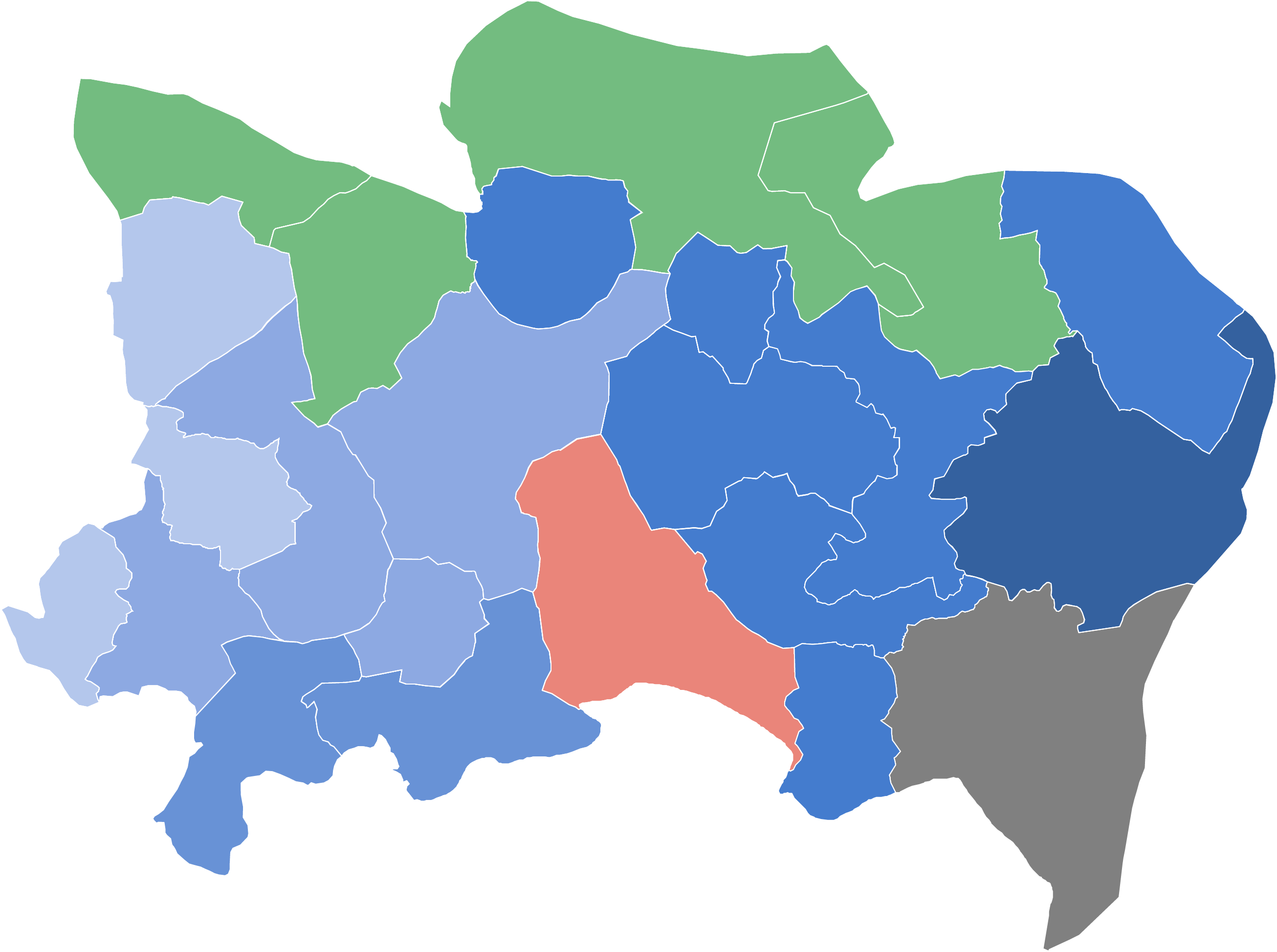
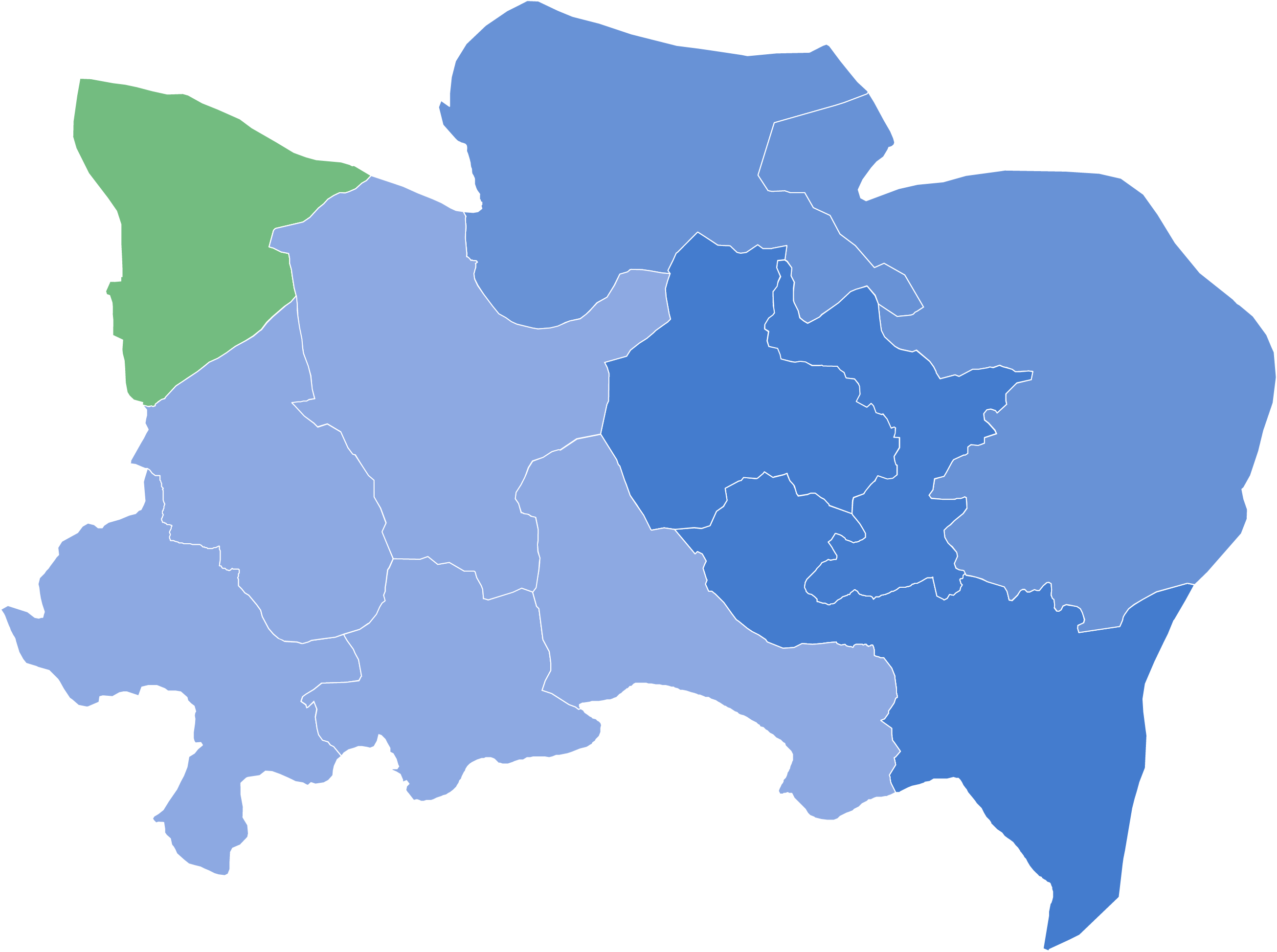
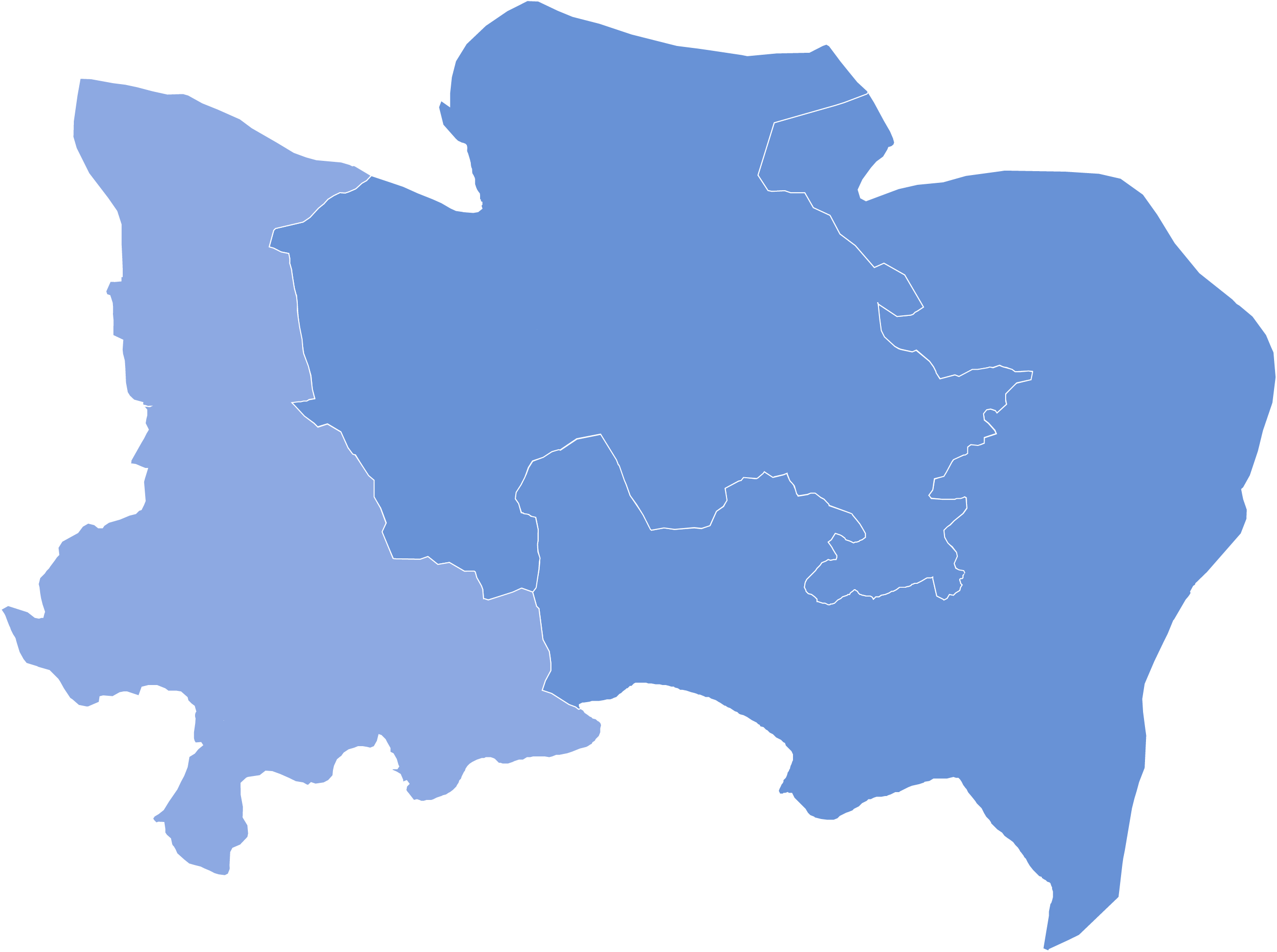
- Alia: 40–50% 50–60% 60–70% 70–80% 80–90% Hembe: 50–60% Uba: 50–60% No election held
Governor before election
Samuel Ortom
PDP
Elected Governor
Hyacinth Alia
APC

Incumbent PDP Governor Samuel Ortom was re-elected to a second term in 2019 with 52.29% of the vote. He will be term-limited in 2023 and cannot seek re-election for a third term. Dondu Ahire (former Commissioner for Water Resources and Solid Minerals), Terver Akase (Chief Press Secretary to Ortom), Robert Orya (former Managing Director/CEO of NEXIM), Titus Uba (House of Assembly member for Kyan and Speaker of the House of Assembly), Terkaa Ucha (House of Assembly member for Vandeikya-Tiev), and Paul Ubwa (BECCIMA President) are declared PDP candidates while Benson Abounu (Deputy Governor and former commissioner) and Terwase Orbunde (former Chief of Staff to Ortom) have expressed interest in contesting and suspended his campaign, respectively.

Announced APC candidates include Barnabas Andyar Gemade (former Senator for Benue North-East), Herman Hembe (House of Representatives member for Konshisha/Vandeikya), Terlumun Ikya (economic consultant) and Steven Lawani (former Deputy Governor).

== Borno State ==
2023 Borno State gubernatorial election
- 18 March 2023
- Registered: 2,513,281
Nominee	Babagana Umara Zulum	Mohammed Ali Jajari
Party	APC	PDP
Running mate	Umar Usman Kadafur	Saleh Ahmed Kida
Popular vote	545,543	82,147
Percentage	86.10%	12.96%
Governor before election
Babagana Umara Zulum
APC
Elected Governor
Babagana Umara Zulum
APC

Incumbent APC Governor Babagana Umara Zulum was elected to a first term in 2019 with 92.78% of the vote. He is eligible to run for re-election, but has not yet stated whether he will do so. Rumored APC primary challengers are 2019 APC gubernatorial candidate Kashim Ibrahim-Imam, Minister of State for Agriculture and Rural Development Mustapha Baba Shehuri, Senator for Borno North Abubakar Kyari, and Senator for Borno South Mohammed Ali Ndume. Rumored PDP candidates include 2015 PDP gubernatorial nominee Gambo Lawan and former Senator for Borno Central Mohammed Abba-Aji.

== Cross River State ==
2023 Cross River State gubernatorial election
- 18 March 2023
- Registered: 1,766,466
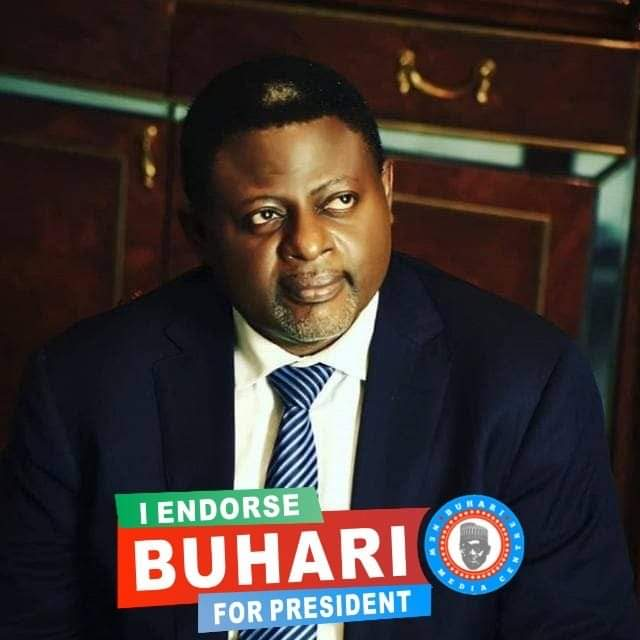
		PDP
Nominee	Bassey Otu	Sandy Ojang Onor
Party	APC	PDP
Running mate	Peter Odey	Emana Ambrose-Amawhe
Popular vote	258,619	179,636
Percentage	57.23%	39.75%
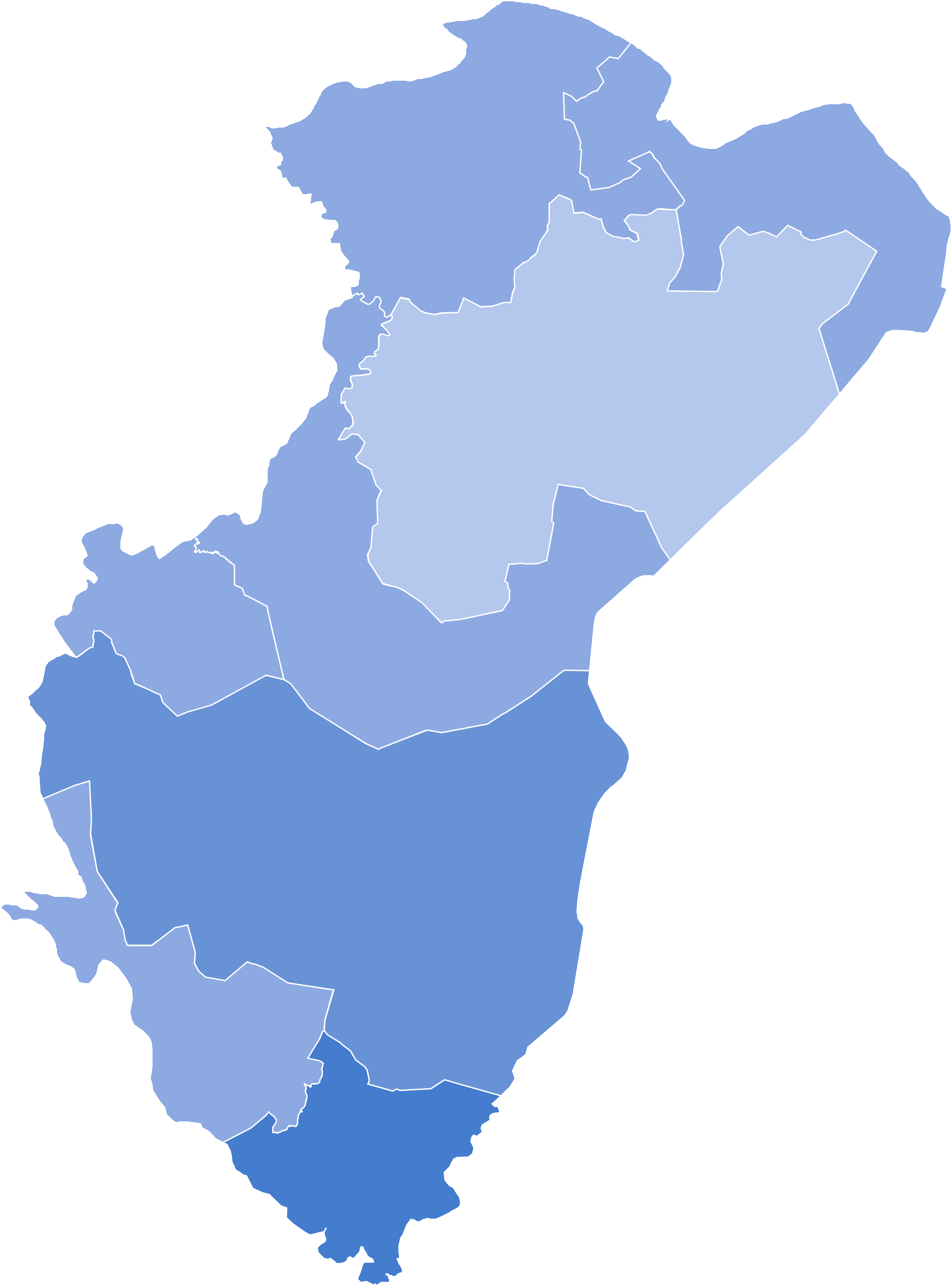
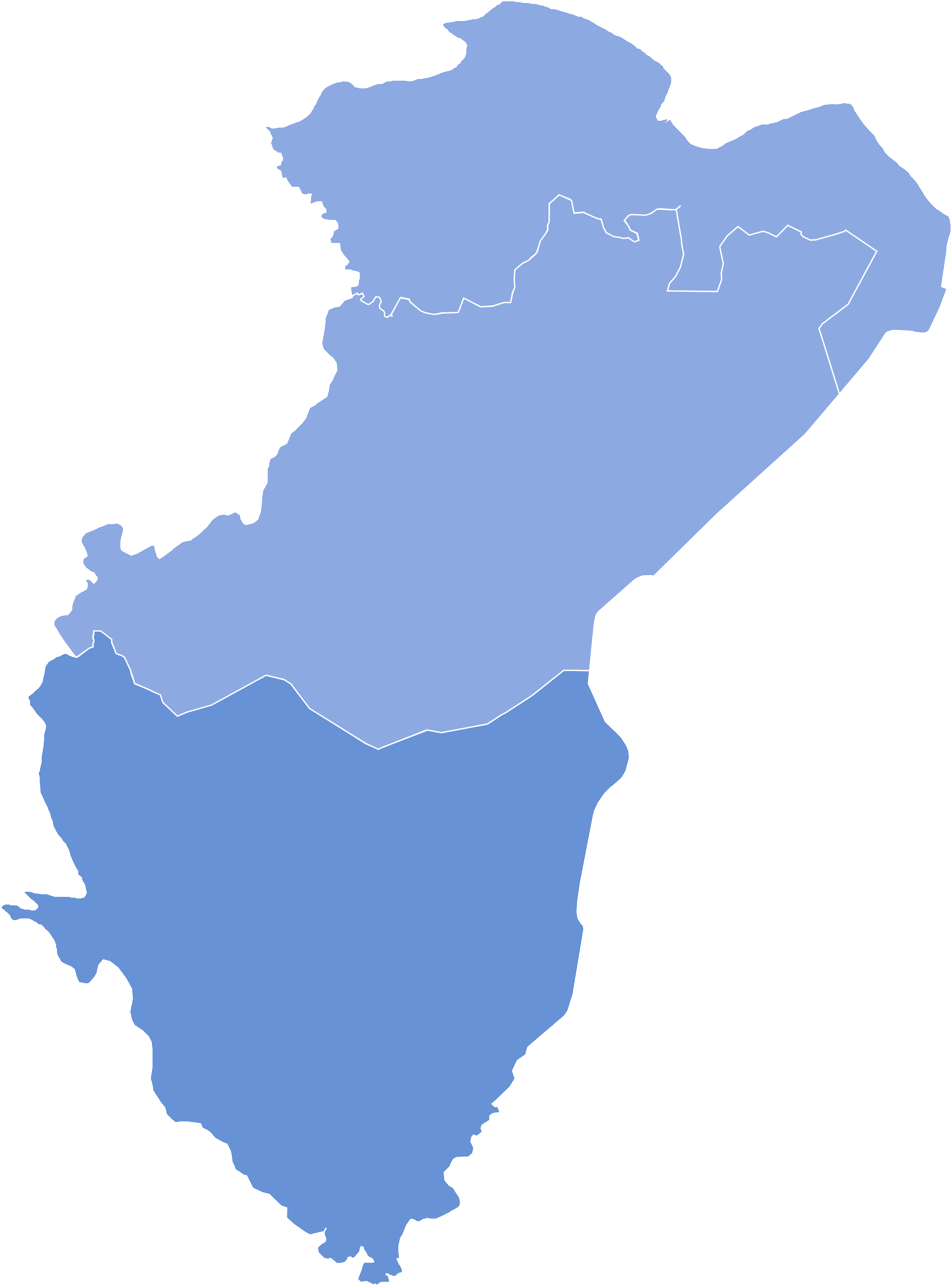
- LGA results Otu: 40–50% 50–60% 60–70% 70–80% 80–90% Onor: 40–50% 50–60%
Governor before election
Benedict Ayade
APC
Elected Governor
Bassey Otu
APC

Incumbent PDP-turned-APC Governor Benedict Ayade was re-elected to a second term in 2019 with 73.04% of the vote. He will be term-limited in 2023 and cannot seek re-election for a third term. A declared APC candidate is Godswill Edward Osim (Ayade aide and son-in-law of former President Goodluck Jonathan) while potential APC candidates include Chris Agara (businessman), Goddy Jedy Agba (Minister of State for Power), Okonkon Effiom (Commissioner for Rural Transformation), Asuquo Ekpenyong (Commissioner for Finance), John Owan Enoh (former Senator for Cross River Central and 2019 APC gubernatorial nominee), Ntufam Ekpo Okon (former House of Representatives member for Calabar Municipal/Odukpani and 2019 APC deputy gubernatorial nominee), Bassey Otu (former Senator for Cross River South), and Usani Uguru Usani (former Niger Delta Minister).

Announced PDP candidates are Arthur Archibong (Chancellor of Arthur Javis University), Daniel Effiong Asuquo (House of Representatives member for Akamkpa/Biase), Gershom Bassey (Senator for Cross River South), and Sandy Ojang Onor (Senator for Cross River Central) while several other politicians are rumored to be potential candidates.

== Delta State ==
2023 Delta State gubernatorial election
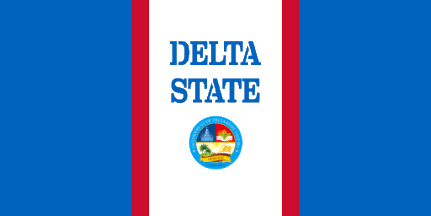
- 18 March 2023
- Registered: 3,221,697
Nominee	Sheriff Oborevwori	Ovie Omo-Agege	Ken Pela
Party	PDP	APC	LP
Running mate	Monday John Onyeme	Friday Osanebi	Julie Nwabogo Umukoro
Popular vote	53.63%	35.76%	7.15%
Percentage	360,234	240,229	48,027
- Omo-Agege: 40–50% 50–60% 60–70% Oborevwori: 40–50% 50–60% 60–70% 70–80%
Governor before election
Ifeanyi Okowa
PDP
Elected Governor
Sheriff Oborevwori
PDP

Incumbent PDP Governor Ifeanyi Okowa was re-elected to a second term in 2019 with 80.17% of the vote. He will be term-limited in 2023 and cannot seek re-election for a third term. A rumored APC candidate is Senator for Delta Central and Senate Deputy President Ovie Omo-Agege. Announced PDP candidates are David Edevbie (former Commissioner for Finance and former Yar'Adua aide), Kenneth Gbagi (2015 PDP gubernatorial candidate and former Minister of State for Education), and Fred Majemite (former Commissioner and husband of former Ethiope West LG Chairwoman Faith Majemite) while there are multiple potential candidates including James Manager (Senator for Delta South), Kingsley Otuaro (Deputy Governor), and Sheriff Oborevwori (House of Assembly member for Okpe and Speaker of the House of Assembly).

== Ebonyi State ==
2023 Ebonyi State gubernatorial election
- 18 March 2023
- Registered: 1,597,646
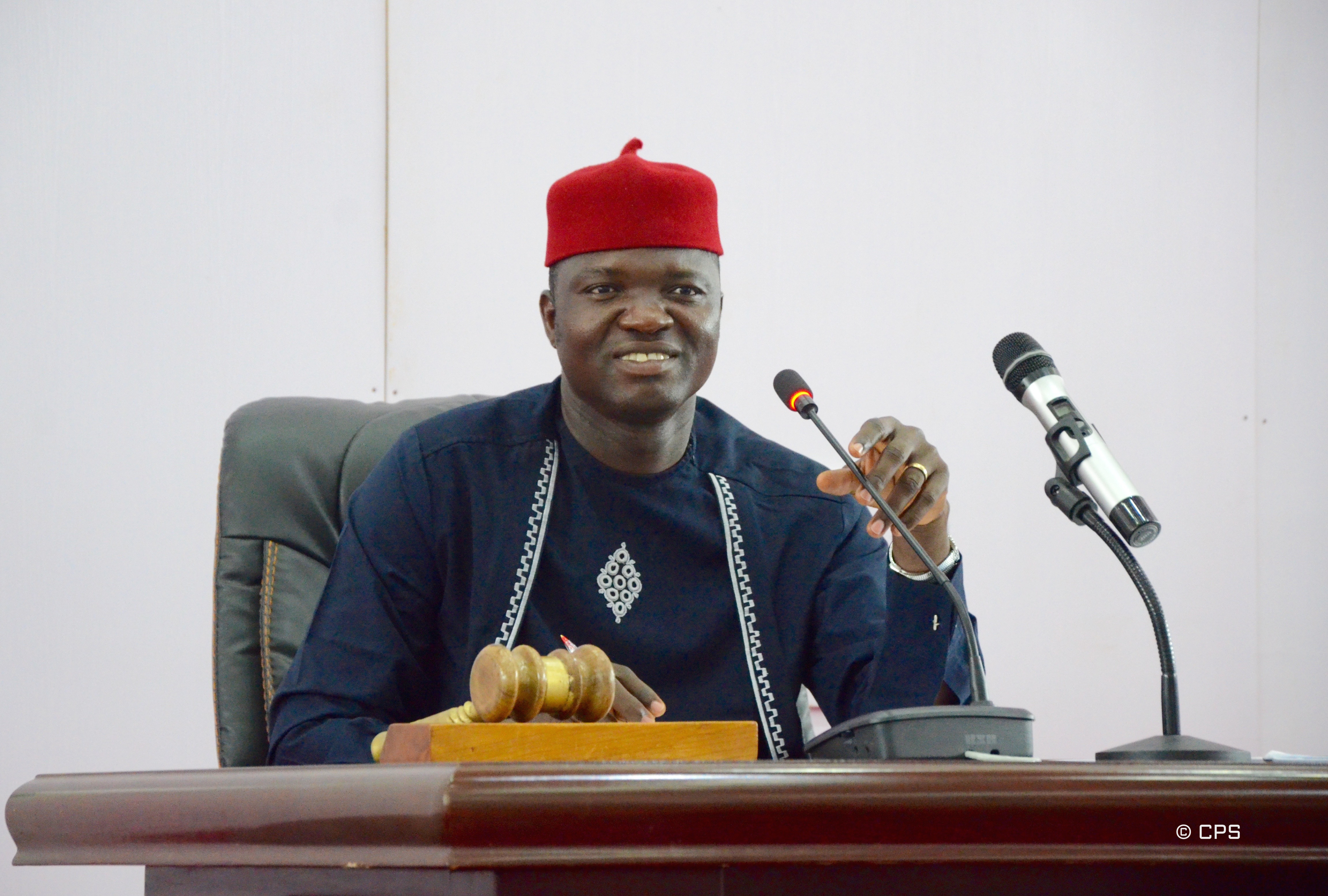
		PDP	APGA
Nominee	Francis Nwifuru	Ifeanyi Odii	Bernard Odoh
Party	APC	PDP	APGA
Running mate	Patricia Obila	Paulinus Igwe Nwagu	Nkata Chuku
Popular vote	199,131	80,191	52,189
Percentage	58.13%	23.41%	15.24%
Governor before election
Dave Umahi
APC
Elected Governor
Francis Nwifuru
APC

Incumbent PDP-turned-APC Governor Dave Umahi was re-elected to a second term in 2019 with 81.54% of the vote. He will be term-limited in 2023 and cannot seek re-election for a third term. Rumored APC candidates include 2019 APC gubernatorial candidate Edward Nkwegu, former Senator for Ebonyi Central Julius Ucha, former SSG and 2019 APC gubernatorial candidate Bernard Odoh, Chairman of the Revenue Mobilization Allocation and Fiscal Commission Elias Mbam, and former Senator for Ebonyi South and 2019 APC gubernatorial nominee Sonni Ogbuoji.

The PDP candidate is Ifeanyichukwu Odii which was confirmed by a court ruling while other aspirants candidates include Joseph Ogba (Senator for Ebonyi Central), Edwin Anayo (House of Representatives member for Ezza North/Ishielu), Fidelis Nwankwo (former Minister of State for Health), Francis Ogbonna Nwifuru (House of Assembly member for Izzi West and Speaker of the House of Assembly), Sylvester Ogbaga (House of Representatives member for Abakaliki/Izzi), and Chris Usulor (House of Assembly member for Ezza South and son of former Senator for Ebonyi Central Vincent Obasi Usulor).

== Enugu State ==
2023 Enugu State gubernatorial election
- 18 March 2023
- Registered: 2,112,793
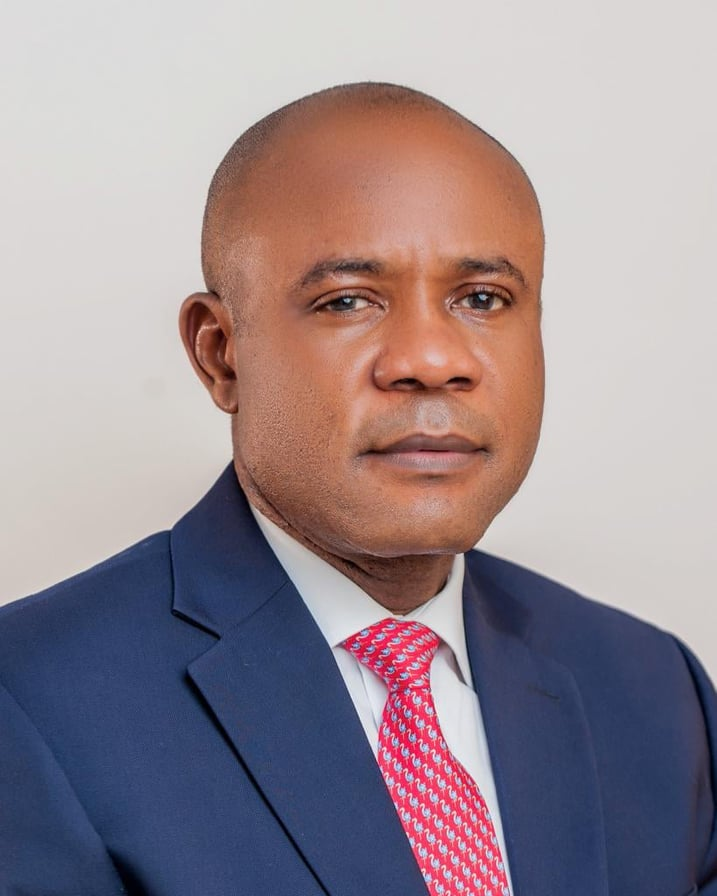

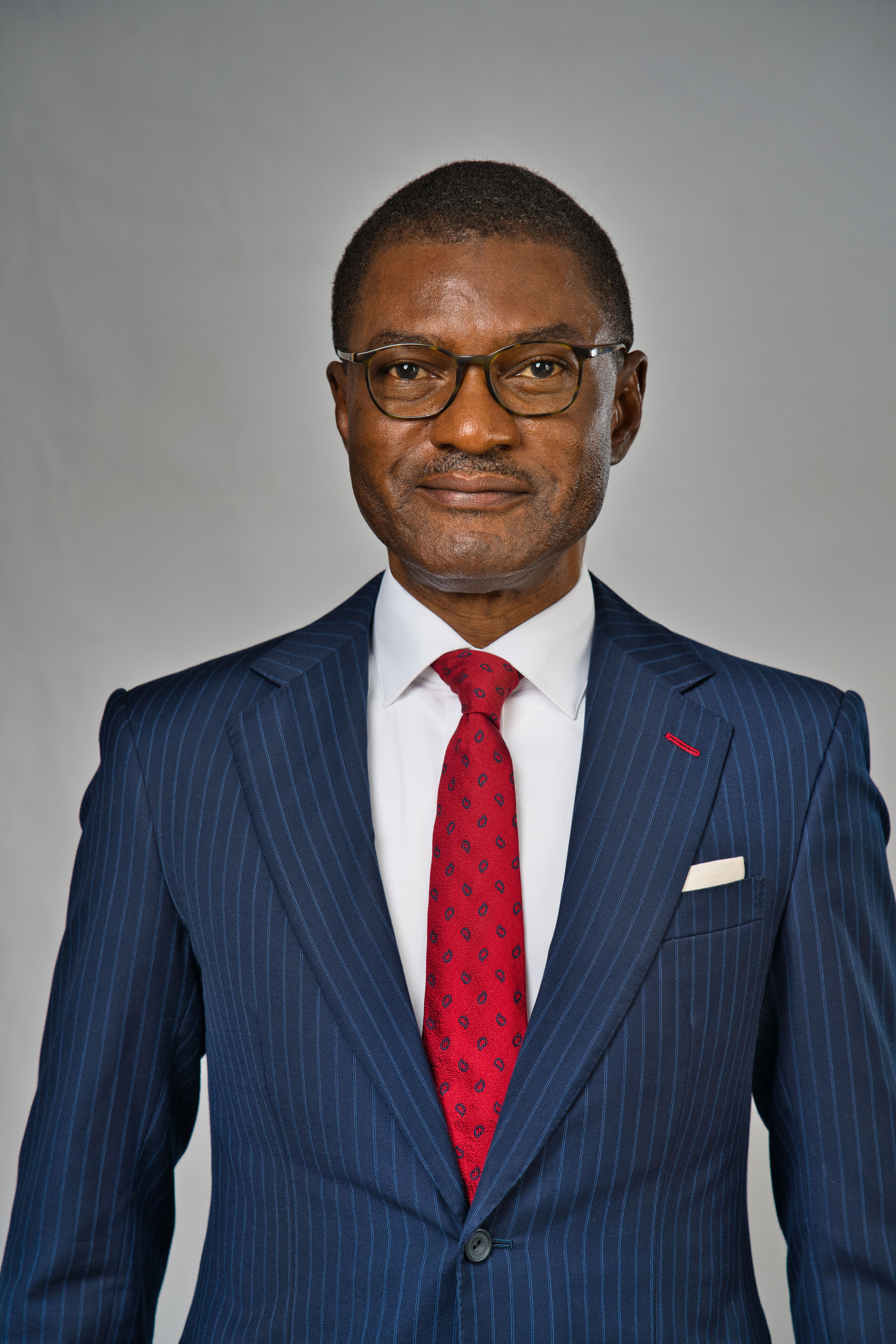
		LP
Nominee	Peter Mbah	Chijioke Edeoga
Party	PDP	LP
Running mate	Ifeanyi Ossai	John Nwokeabia
Popular vote	160,895	157,552
Percentage	44.88%	43.95%
		APC
Nominee	Frank Nweke	Uche Nnaji
Party	APGA	APC
Running mate	Edith Ugwuanyi	George Ogara
Popular vote	17,983	14,575
Percentage	5.02%	4.07%
- LGA results Edeoga: 40–50% 50–60% 60–70% Mbah: 40–50% 50–60% 80–90% >90%
Governor before election
Ifeanyi Ugwuanyi
PDP
Elected Governor
Peter Mbah
PDP

PDP Governor Ifeanyi Ugwuanyi was re-elected to a second term in 2019 with 95.54% of the vote. He will be term-limited in 2023 and cannot seek re-election for a third term. A rumored APC candidate is former Senator for Enugu North and 2019 APC gubernatorial nominee Ayogu Eze. Rumored PDP candidates include Senator for Enugu West Ike Ekweremadu, former Federal Permanent Secretary Chinyeaka Ohaa, House of Representatives member for Nsukka/Igbo-Eze South Patrick Asadu, former Minister of Power Bartholomew Nnaji, House of Assembly Speaker and member for Enugu East Urban Edward Uchenna Ubosi, former Minister of Information and Communications Frank Nweke, Commissioner and former House of Representatives member for Enugu East/Isi-Uzo Chijioke Jonathan Edeoga, and former Senator for Enugu East Gilbert Nnaji.

== Gombe State ==
2023 Gombe State gubernatorial election
- 18 March 2023
- Registered: 1,575,794
Nominee	Muhammad Inuwa Yahaya	Mohammed Jibrin Barde
Party	APC	PDP
Running mate	Manasseh Daniel Jatau	Timothy Danlele
Popular vote	342,821	233,131
Percentage	56.63%	38.51%
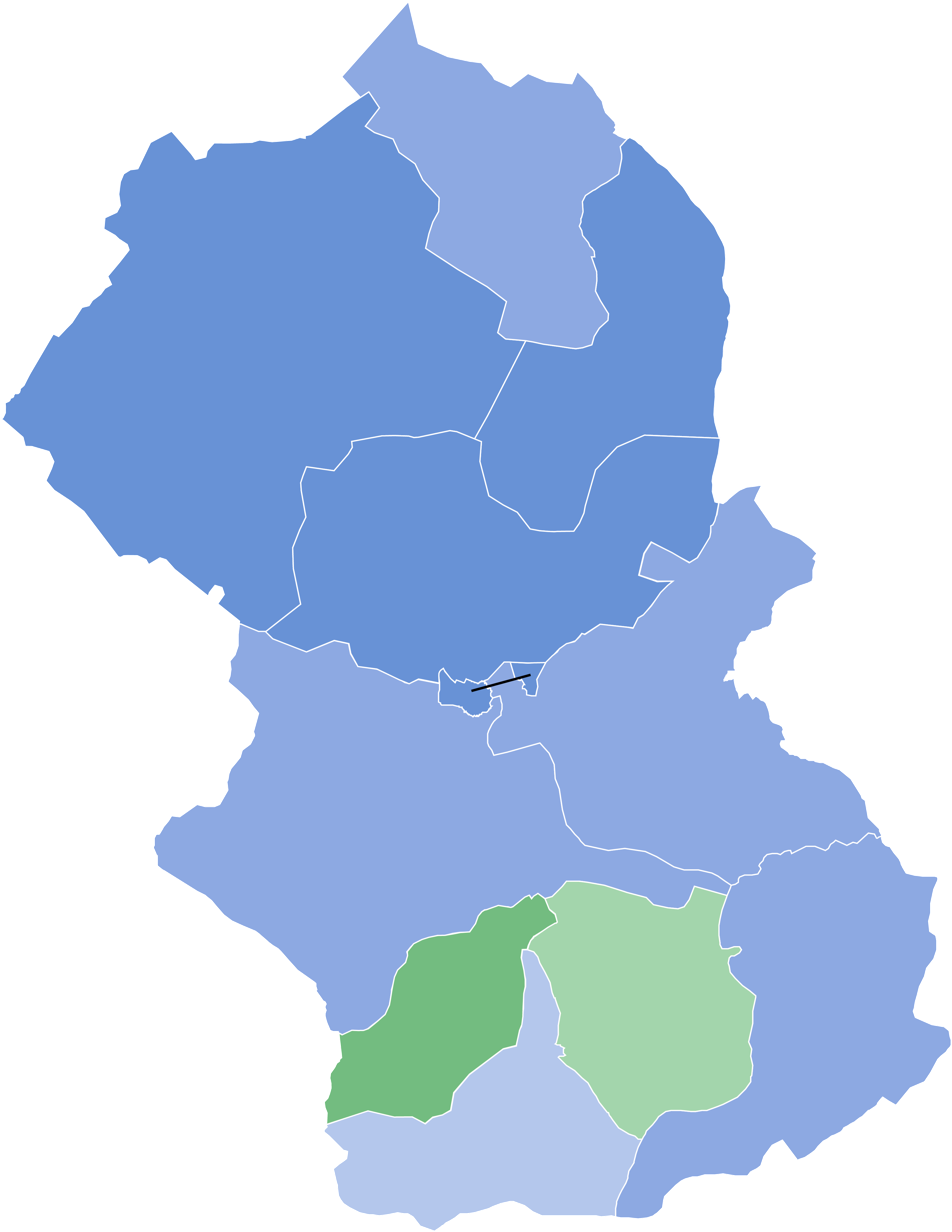
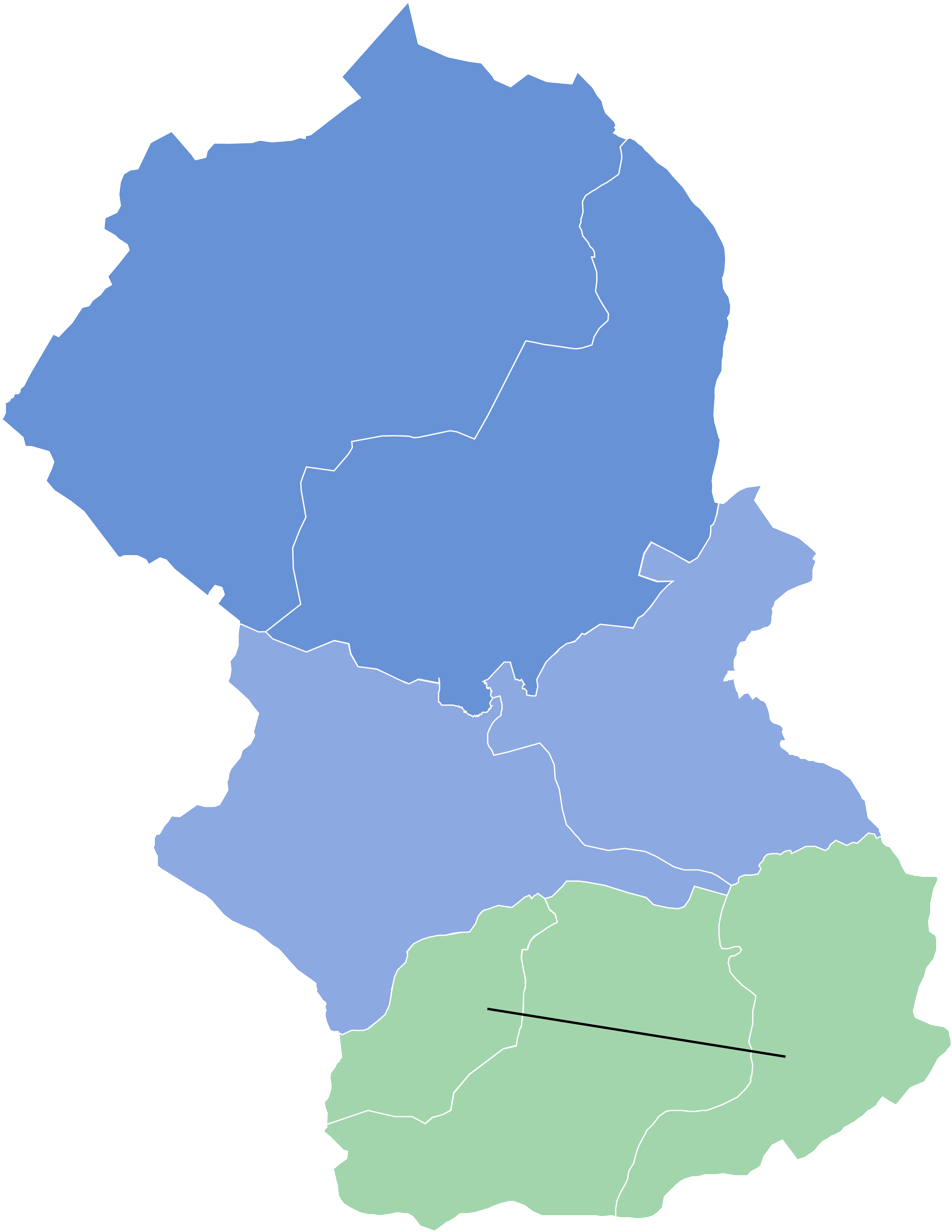
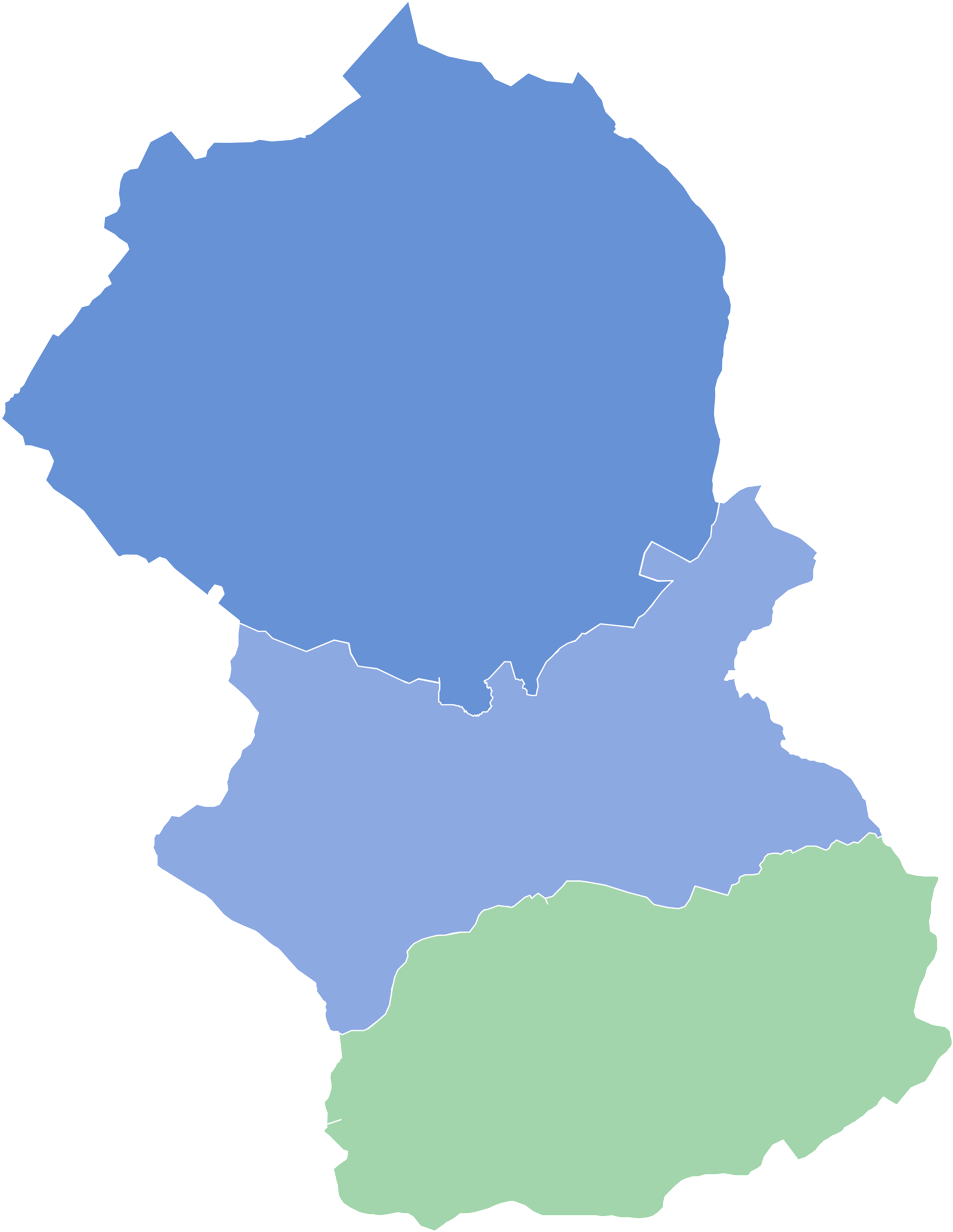
- Yahaya: 40–50% 50–60% 60–70% Jibrin: 40–50% 50–60%
Governor before election
Muhammad Inuwa Yahaya
APC
Elected Governor
Muhammad Inuwa Yahaya
APC

Incumbent APC Governor Muhammad Inuwa Yahaya was elected to a first term in 2019 with 59.88% of the vote. He has announced his run for re-election. A rumored PDP candidate is former Deputy Speaker of the House of Representatives, former House of Representatives member for Dukku/Nafada, and 2019 PDP gubernatorial nominee Usman Bayero Nafada.

== Imo State ==
2023 Imo State gubernatorial election
- 11 November 2023
Nominee	Hope Uzodinma	Samuel Anyanwu	Athan Achonu
Party	APC	PDP	LP
Running mate	Chinyere Ekomaru	Jones Onyereri	Tony Nwulu
Popular vote	540,308	71,503	64,081
- LGA results APC: 40–50% 50–60% 60–70% 70–80% 80–90% >90%
Governor before election
Hope Uzodinma
APC
Elected Governor
Hope Uzodinma
APC

== Jigawa State ==
2023 Jigawa State gubernatorial election
- 18 March 2023
- Registered: 2,351,298
Nominee	Umar Namadi	Mustapha Sule Lamido
Party	APC	PDP
Running mate	Aminu Usman	Babandi Ibrahim Gumel
Popular vote	618,449	368,726
Percentage	59.89%	35.71%
Governor before election
Mohammed Badaru Abubakar
APC
Elected Governor
Umar Namadi
APC

Incumbent APC Governor Mohammed Badaru Abubakar was re-elected to a second term in 2019 with 73.51% of the vote. He will be term-limited in 2023 and cannot seek re-election for a third term. Rumored APC candidates include Senator for Jigawa North Ibrahim Hassan Hadejia and Senator for Jigawa South-West Mohammed Sabo Nakudu among others. Rumored PDP candidates include Mustapha Sule Lamido (2019 PDP Jigawa South-West senatorial nominee and son of former Governor Sule Lamido) and former Minister of State for Foreign Affairs and 2015 PDP deputy gubernatorial nominee Nuruddeen Muhammad.

== Kaduna State ==
2023 Kaduna State gubernatorial election
- 18 March 2023
- Registered: 4,335,208
Nominee	Uba Sani	Isa Ashiru	Jonathan Asake
Party	APC	PDP	LP
Running mate	Hadiza Sabuwa Balarabe	John Ayuba	Bashir Idris Aliyu
Popular vote	730,002	719,196	58,283
Percentage	47.20%	46.49%	3.77%
Governor before election
Nasir Ahmad el-Rufai
APC
Elected Governor
Uba Sani
APC

Incumbent APC Governor Nasir Ahmad el-Rufai was re-elected to a second term in 2019 with 55.32% of the vote. He will be term-limited in 2023 and cannot seek re-election for a third term. Rumored APC candidates include Muhammad Sani Abdullahi (Commissioner for Budget and Planning and former Chief of Staff to el-Rufai), Samuel Aruwan (Commissioner for Internal Security and Home Affairs), Hadiza Sabuwa Balarabe (Deputy Governor), Muhammad Hafiz Beyero (Administrator of the Kaduna Capital Territory), Suleiman Abdu Kwari (Senator for Kaduna North and former Commissioner for Finance), Ja'afaru Ibrahim Sani (Commissioner for Local Government Affairs), Uba Sani (Senator for Kaduna Central), and Hadiza Bala Usman (former Managing Director of the Nigerian Ports Authority and co-founder of the Bring Back Our Girls campaign).

Declared PDP candidates include Mohammad Sani Abbas (A barrister, businessman and financial consultant) Yusuf Datti Baba-Ahmed (former Senator for Kaduna North and former House of Representatives member for Zaria) Shehu Sani (former Senator for Kaduna Central) while the announcement of the campaign of Isah Ashiru (2019 PDP gubernatorial nominee, former House of Representatives member for Makarfi/Kudan, and former House of Assembly member for Kudan) is pending.

== Kano State ==
2023 Kano State gubernatorial election
- 18 March 2023
- Opinion polls
- Registered: 5,921,370
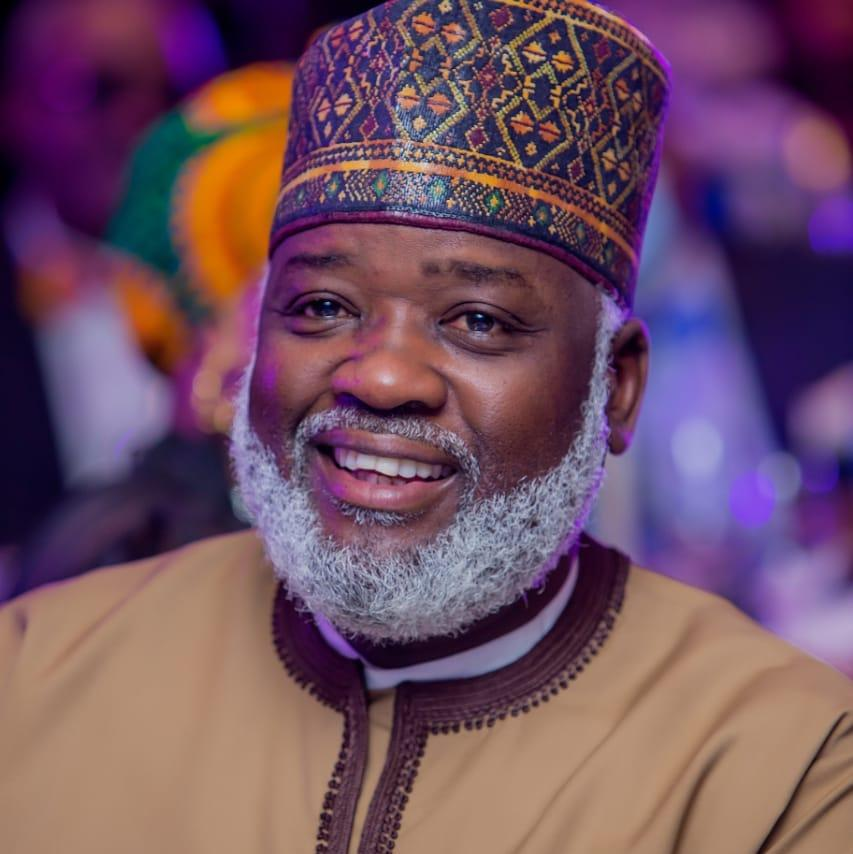
			PDP
Nominee	Abba Kabir Yusuf	Nasir Yusuf Gawuna	Sadiq Wali
Party	NNPP	APC	PDP
Running mate	Aminu Abdussalam Gwarzo	Murtala Sule Garo	Yusuf Bello Dambatta
Popular vote	1,019,602	890,705	15,957
Percentage	51.55%	45.03%	0.81%
Governor before election
Abdullahi Umar Ganduje
APC
Elected Governor
Abba Kabir Yusuf
NNPP

Incumbent APC Governor Abdullahi Umar Ganduje was re-elected to a second term in 2019 with 50.23% of the vote. He will be term-limited in 2023 and cannot seek re-election for a third term. Inuwa Ibrahim Waya (former Nigerian National Petroleum Corporation official), Abdussalam Abdulkarim Zaura (A.A.) Zaura (2019 GPN gubernatorial nominee), and Barau Jibrin (Senator for Kano North) have either announced or have pending announcements; on the other hand, Murtala Sule Garo (Commissioner for Local Government and Community Development) and Nasir Yusuf Gawuna (Deputy Governor) are rumored to looking at running.

For the PDP, rumored candidates are Abdullahi Baffa Bichi (former Executive Secretary of Tertiary Education Trust Fund), Muhuyi Magaji Rimingado (Chairman of Kano Public Complaints and Anti-Corruption Commission), and Abba Kabir Yusuf (2019 PDP gubernatorial nominee and former Commissioner of Works, Housing, and Transport).

== Katsina State ==
2023 Katsina State gubernatorial election
- 18 March 2023
- Registered: 3,516,719
Nominee	Dikko Umaru Radda	Garba Yakubu Lado
Party	APC	PDP
Running mate	Faruk Lawal Jobe	Ahmed Aminu Yar’Adua
Popular vote	859,892	486,620
Percentage	62.96%	35.63%
Governor before election
Aminu Bello Masari
APC
Elected Governor
Dikko Umaru Radda
APC

Incumbent APC Governor Aminu Bello Masari was re-elected to a second term in 2019 with 70.04% of the vote. He will be term-limited in 2023 and cannot seek re-election for a third term. Rumored APC candidates include Minister of Aviation Hadi Sirika, Senator for Katsina North Ahmad Babba Kaita, SMEDAN Director-General Dikko Umaru Radda, Federal Mortgage Bank of Nigeria Managing Director/CEO Ahmed Musa Dangiwa, and former House of Representatives member for Katsina Central Abubakar Sadiq Yar'adua.

== Kebbi State ==
2023 Kebbi State gubernatorial election
- 18 March 2023
- Registered: 2,032,041
Nominee	Nasir Idris	Aminu Bande
Party	APC	PDP
Running mate	Abubakar Umar Argungu	Samaila Salihu Bui
Popular vote	409,225	360,940
Percentage	52.37%	46.19%
Governor before election
Abubakar Atiku Bagudu
APC
Elected Governor
Nasir Idris
APC

Incumbent APC Governor Abubakar Atiku Bagudu was re-elected to a second term in 2019 with 84.92% of the vote. He will be term-limited in 2023 and cannot seek re-election for a third term. Rumored APC candidates include Nigeria Union of Teachers President and Nigeria Labour Congress Vice National Chairman Nasir Idris, Minister of Justice and Attorney General of the Federation Abubakar Malami, Senator for Kebbi North Yahaya Abubakar Abdullahi, and Senator for Kebbi South Bala Ibn Na'allah. For the PDP, former Army Major General Aminu Bande has announced his candidacy.

== Kogi State ==
2023 Kogi State gubernatorial election
- 11 November 2023
- Turnout: 40.98%
Nominee	Ahmed Usman Ododo	Murtala Ajaka	Dino Melaye
Party	APC	SDP	PDP
Running mate	Salifu Joel	Sam Abenemi	Habeebat Deen
Popular vote	446,237	259,052	46,362
Percentage	57.04%	33.11%	5.93%
- LGA results Ododo: 40–50% 50–60% 60–70% >90% Ajaka: 60–70% 70–80% 80–90% Abejide: 40–50%
Governor before election
Yahaya Bello
APC
Elected Governor
Ahmed Usman Ododo
APC

Incumbent APC Governor Yahaya Bello was elected to a second term in 2019 with 66.51% of the vote. He will be term-limited in 2023 and cannot seek re-election for a third term. Potential APC candidates are Smart Adeyemi (Senator for Kogi West), Abdulkareem Jamiu Asuku (Chief of Staff to Bello), Jibrin Isah (Senator for Kogi East), Mukadam Ashiru Idris (Commissioner of Finance), and Edward David Onoja (Deputy Governor). A rumored PDP candidate is Dino Melaye, 2019 PDP gubernatorial candidate and former Senator for Kogi West.

== Kwara State ==
2023 Kwara State gubernatorial election
- 18 March 2023
- Opinion polls
- Registered: 1,695,927
- Turnout: 27.88%
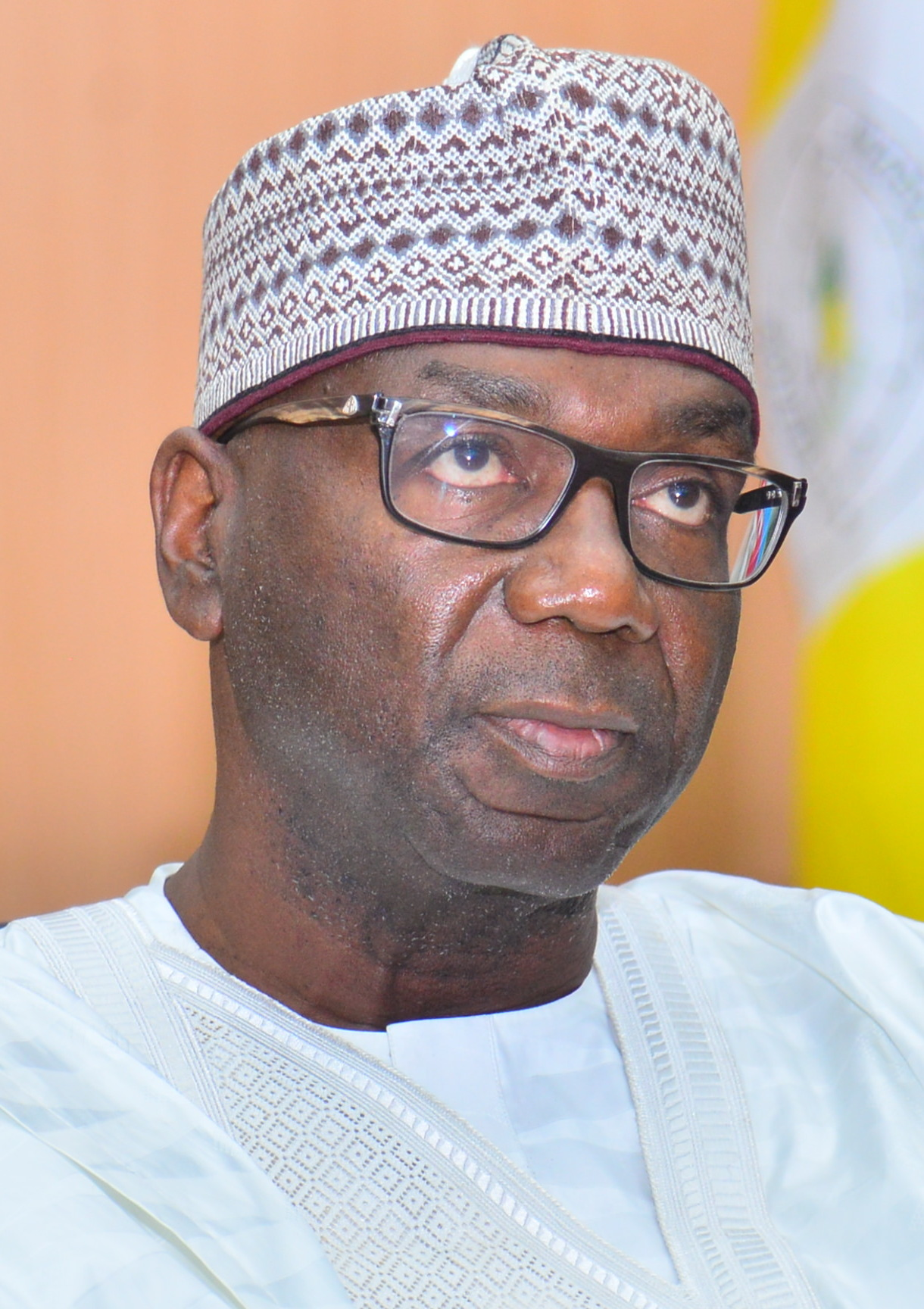
		PDP	SDP
Nominee	AbdulRahman AbdulRazaq	Shuaib Yaman Abdullahi	Hakeem Lawal
Party	APC	PDP	SDP
Running mate	Kayode Alabi	Gbenga Peter Makanjuola	Joshua Olayinka Olakunle
Popular vote	273,424	155,490	18,922
Percentage	59.38%	33.77%	4.11%
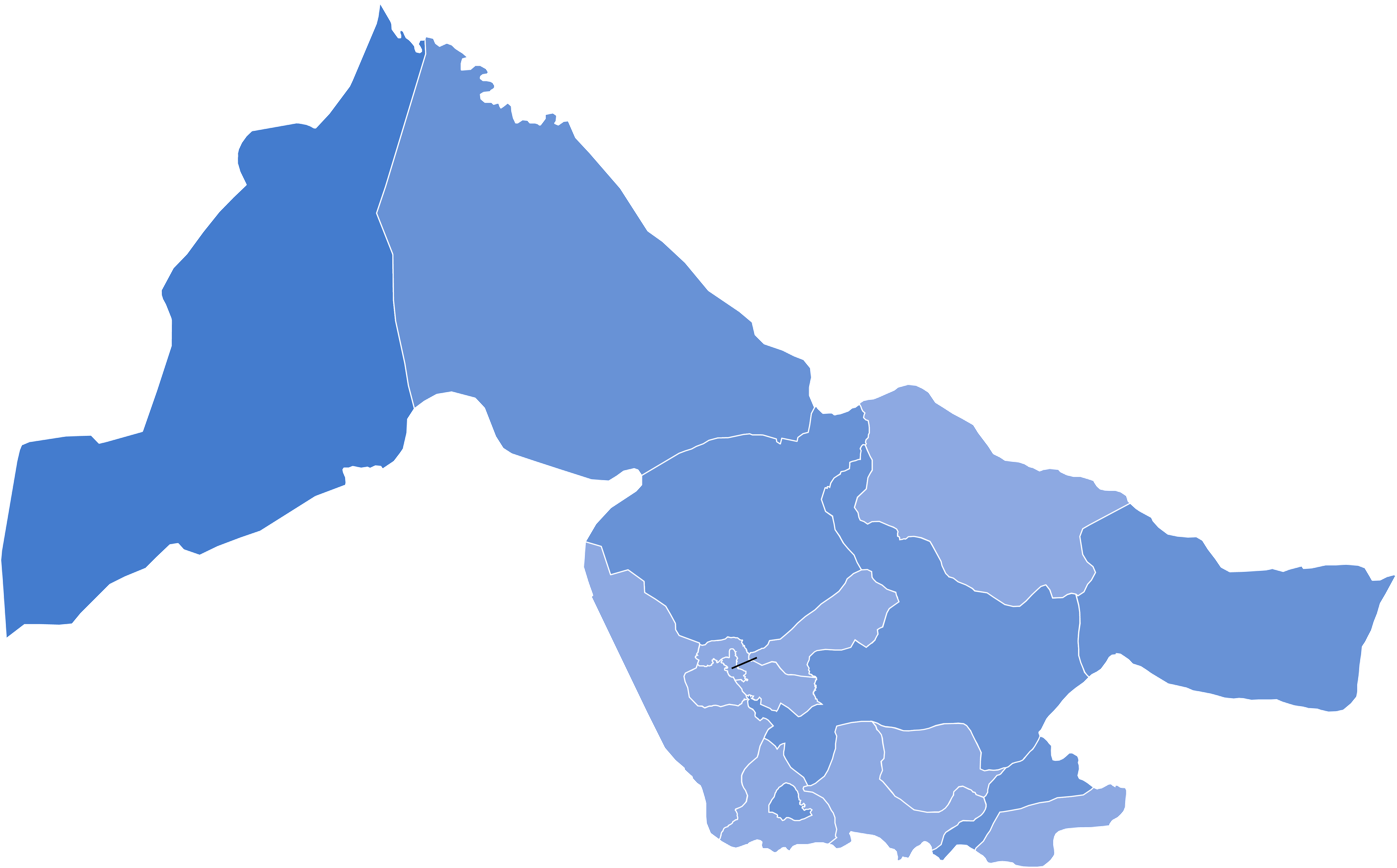
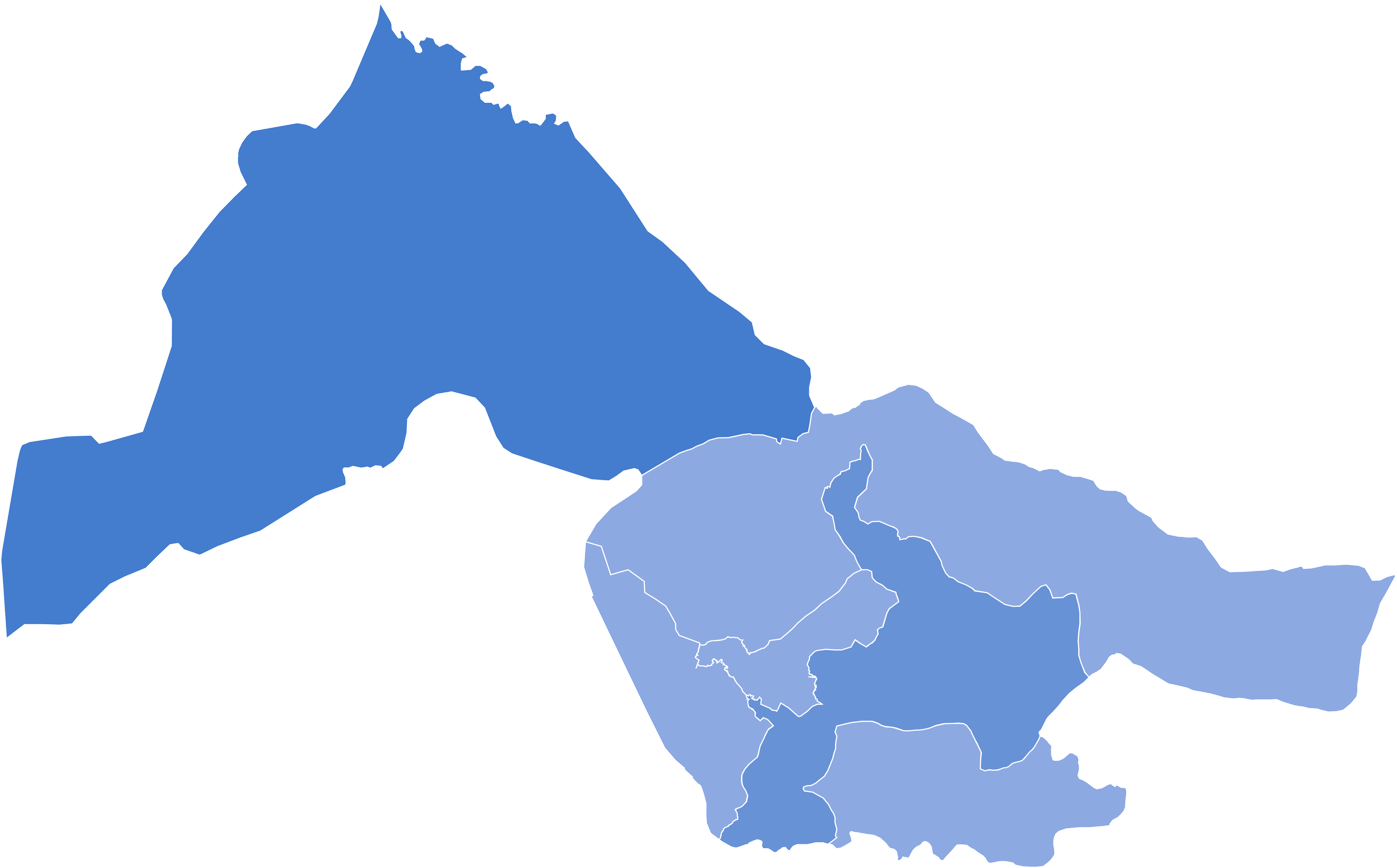
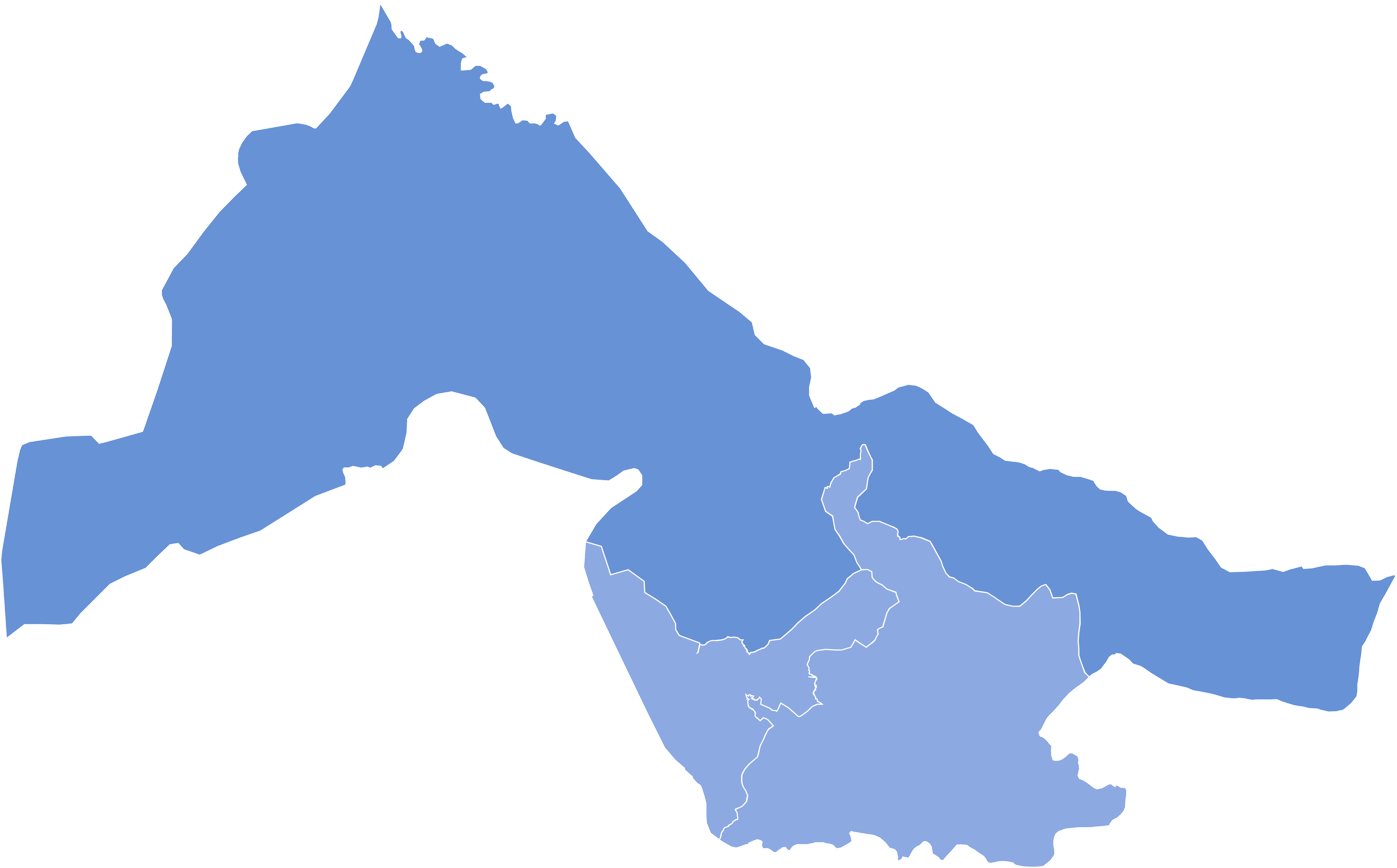
- AbdulRazaq: 50–60% 60–70% 70–80%
Governor before election
AbdulRahman AbdulRazaq
APC
Elected Governor
AbdulRahman AbdulRazaq
APC

Incumbent APC Governor AbdulRahman AbdulRazaq was elected to a first term in 2019 with 73.12% of the vote. He is eligible to run for re-election, but has not yet stated whether he will do so. Rumored PDP candidates include Bolaji Abdullahi (former Minister of Sports and former Minister of Youth Development), Ali Ahmad (former House of Assembly member for Ilorin South, former Speaker of the Kwara State House of Assembly, and former House of Representatives member for Ilorin East/Ilorin South), and Abdulwahab Issa (former House of Representatives member for Ilorin East/Ilorin South).

== Lagos State ==
2023 Lagos State gubernatorial election
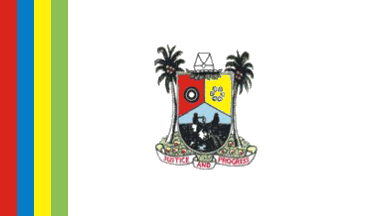
- 18 March 2023
- Opinion polls
- Registered: 7,060,195
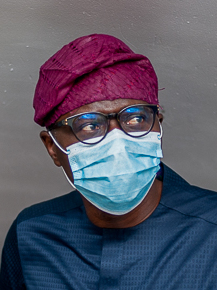

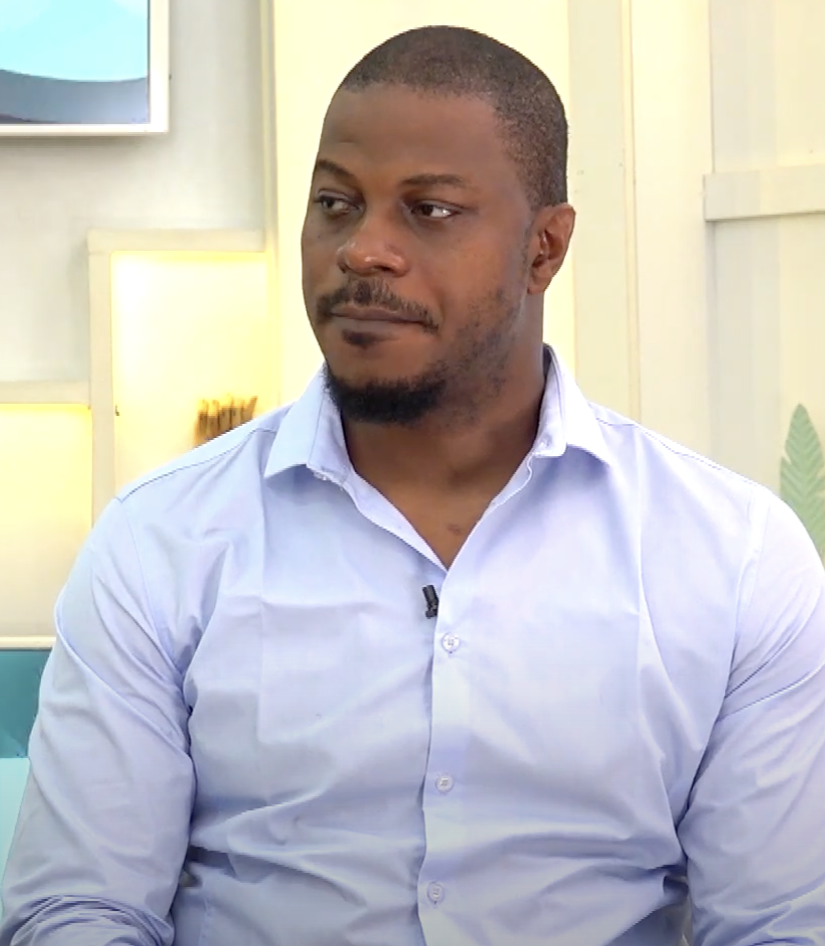
			PDP
Nominee	Babajide Sanwo-Olu	Gbadebo Rhodes-Vivour	Abdul-Azeez Olajide Adediran
Party	APC	LP	PDP
Running mate	Femi Hamzat	Abiodun Oyefusi	Funke Akindele
Popular vote	762,134	312,329	62,449
Percentage	65.95%	27.03%	5.40%
- Results by local government area
Governor before election
Babajide Sanwo-Olu
APC
Elected Governor
Babajide Sanwo-Olu
APC

Incumbent APC Governor Babajide Sanwo-Olu was elected to a first term in 2019 with 75.65% of the vote. He is eligible to run for re-election, but has not yet stated whether he will do so. Rumored APC primary challengers to Sanwo-Olu include Tokunbo Abiru (Senator for Lagos East (2020–present) and former Commissioner for Finance), Femi Hamzat (Deputy Governor and former Commissioner for Science and Technology), and Hakeem Muri-Okunola (state Head of Service) among others.

For the PDP, potential candidates include Adedeji Doherty (former Lagos State PDP Chairman), Ade Dosunmu (former Director General of the Nigerian Maritime Administration and Safety Agency), and Babatunde Gbadamosi (2020 PDP Lagos East senatorial by-election nominee and 2019 ADP gubernatorial nominee) while Abdul-Azeez Olajide Adediran has declared his candidacy.

== Nasarawa State ==
2023 Nasarawa State gubernatorial election
- 18 March 2023
- Registered: 1,899,244
Nominee	Abdullahi Sule	David Ombugadu
Party	APC	PDP
Running mate	Emmanuel Agbadu Akabe	Yahaya Usman-Ohinoyi
Popular vote	347,209	283,016
Percentage	53.10%	43.28%
Governor before election
Abdullahi Sule
APC
Elected Governor
Abdullahi Sule
APC

Incumbent APC Governor Abdullahi Sule was elected to a first term in 2019 with 48.78% of the vote. He is eligible to run for re-election, but has not yet stated whether he will do so. Rumored PDP candidates include 2019 PDP gubernatorial nominee and former Akwanga/Nasarawa Eggon/Wamba Representative David Ombugadu, former Nasarawa North Senator and 2019 PDP gubernatorial candidate Solomon Ewuga, and 2015 PDP gubernatorial nominee Yusuf Agabi. A rumored APGA candidate is 2015 and 2019 APGA gubernatorial nominee Labaran Maku.

== Niger State ==
2023 Niger State gubernatorial election
- 18 March 2023
- Registered: 2,698,344
Nominee	Mohammed Umar Bago	Isah Liman Kantigi
Party	APC	PDP
Running mate	Yakubu Garba	Samuel Gomna
Popular vote	469,896	387,476
Percentage	53.82%	44.38%
Governor before election
Abubakar Sani Bello
APC
Elected Governor
Mohammed Umar Bago
APC

Incumbent APC Governor Abubakar Sani Bello was re-elected to a second term in 2019 with 58.43% of the vote. He will be term-limited in 2023 and cannot seek re-election for a third term. Rumored APC candidates include Abubakar Lado Abdullahi (House of Representatives member for Gurara/Suleja/Tafa and former House of Assembly member), Ahmed Muhammad Ketso (Deputy Governor), Sani Ndanusa (former Minister of Youths, Sports and Social Development), and Umaru Mohammed Bago (House of Representatives member for Chanchaga).

Rumored PDP candidates include Isah Liman Kantigi (2015 PDP deputy gubernatorial nominee) and Mohammed Sani Kutigi (2015 and 2019 PDP gubernatorial nominee, former House of Representatives member for Lavun/Mokwa/Edati (2011–2015), and son of former Supreme Court Chief Justice Idris Legbo Kutigi).

== Ogun State ==
2023 Ogun State gubernatorial election
- 18 March 2023
- Registered: 2,688,305
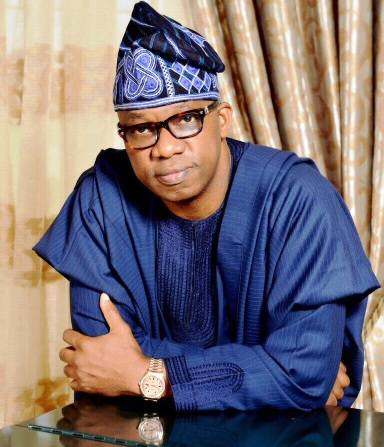

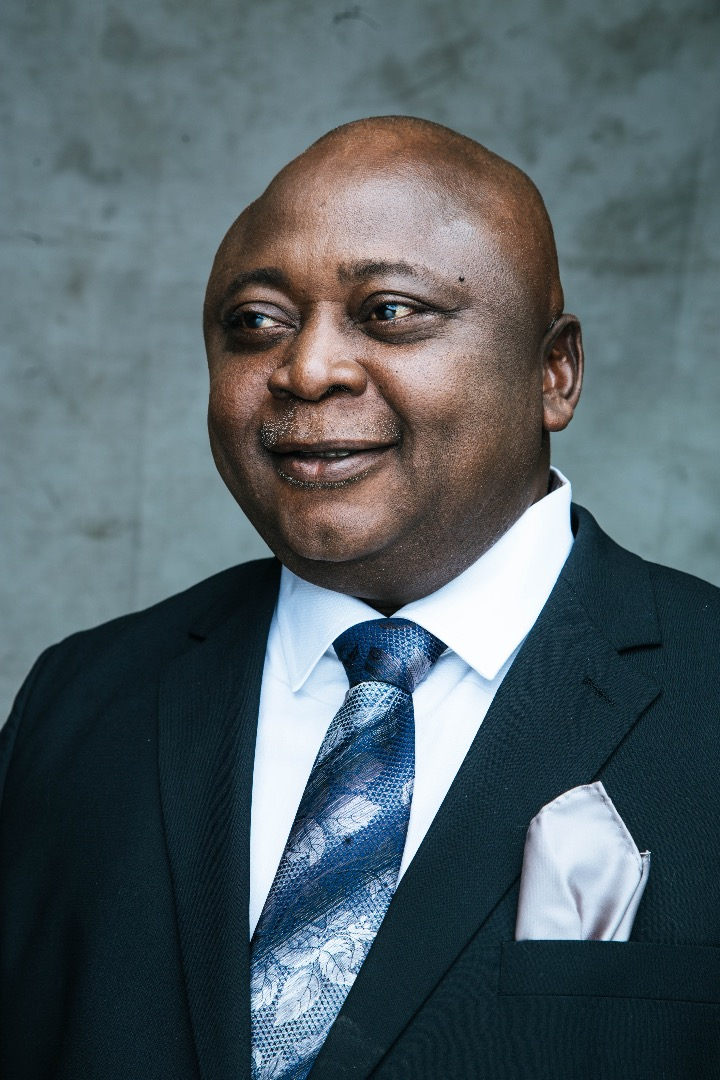
			ADC
Nominee	Dapo Abiodun	Ladi Adebutu	Olubiyi Otegbeye
Party	APC	PDP	ADC
Running mate	Noimot Salako-Oyedele	Adekunle Akinlade	Olatunde Awonuga
Popular vote	276,298	262,383	94,754
Percentage	42.83%	40.67%	14.69%
- LGA results Abiodun: 30–40% 40–50% 50–60% Adebutu: 40–50% 50–60% 60–70%
Governor before election
Dapo Abiodun
APC
Elected Governor
Dapo Abiodun
APC

Incumbent APC Governor Dapo Abiodun was elected to a first term in 2019 with 35.49% of the vote. He is eligible to run for re-election, but has not yet stated whether he will do so. Rumored APC primary challengers to Abiodun include Solomon Olamilekan Adeola (Senator for Lagos West, former House of Representatives member for Alimosho, and former Lagos State House of Assembly member for Alimosho II), Adekunle Akinlade (former House of Representatives member for Egbado South/Ipokia (2015–2019) and 2019 APC gubernatorial candidate and APM gubernatorial nominee), Gboyega Nasir Isiaka (2019 ADC gubernatorial nominee, 2015 PDP gubernatorial nominee, and former Governor Gbenga Daniel administration aide), and Ramoni Olalekan Mustapha (Senator for Ogun East).

For the PDP, potential candidates include Oladipupo Olatunde Adebutu (former House of Representatives member for Remo/Shagamu/Ikenne (2015–2019) and 2019 PDP gubernatorial candidate) and Segun Sowunmi (Atiku Abubakar 2019 presidential campaign spokesman).

== Oyo State ==
2023 Oyo State gubernatorial election
- 18 March 2023
- Registered: 3,276,675
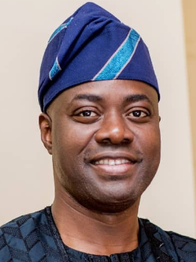

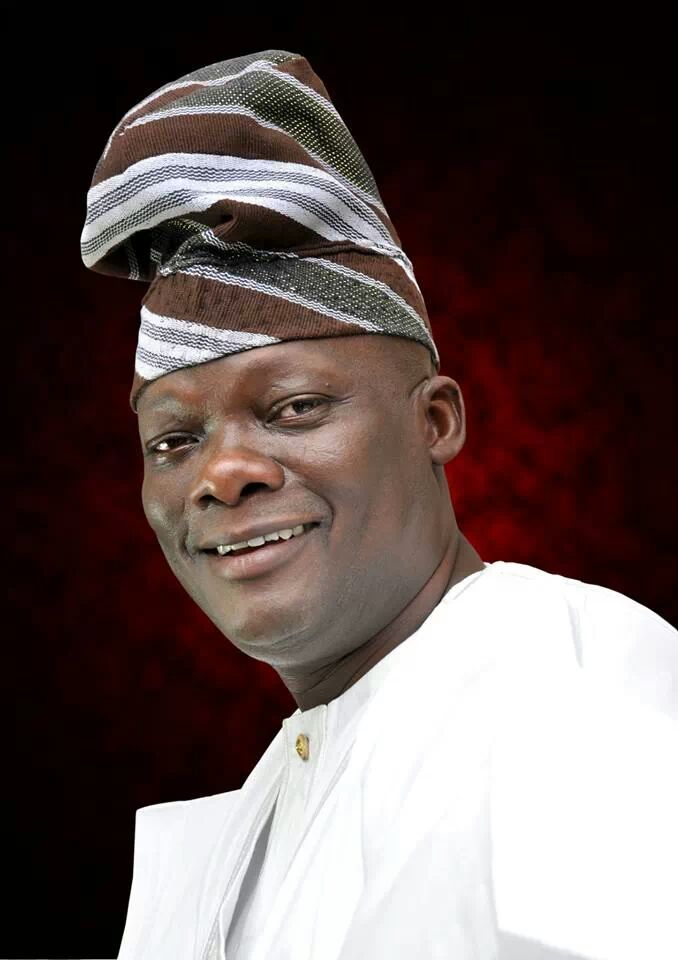

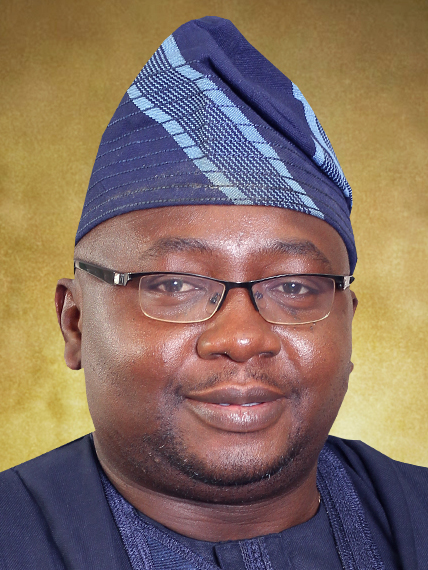
Nominee	Seyi Makinde	Teslim Folarin	Adebayo Adelabu
Party	PDP	APC	A
Running mate	Bayo Lawal	David Oluwafemi Okunlola	Abiodun Ayanfemi Ayandele
Popular vote	563,756	256,685	38,357
Percentage	63.37%	28.86%	4.31%
Governor before election
Seyi Makinde
PDP
Elected Governor
Seyi Makinde
PDP

Incumbent PDP Governor Seyi Makinde was elected to a first term in 2019 with 56.24% of the vote. He is eligible to run for re-election, but has not yet stated whether he will do so. Rumored APC candidates include former CBN Deputy Governor of Operations and 2019 APC gubernatorial nominee Adebayo Adelabu, Senator for Oyo Central Teslim Folarin, and former Chief of Staff to former Governor Abiola Ajimobi and Nigerian Communications Commission Chairman Adeolu Akande, Senator for Oyo North Abdulfatai Buhari, former Senator for Oyo South and 2019 ADC gubernatorial candidate Olufemi Lanlehin, and 2019 APC gubernatorial candidate Joseph Olasunkanmi Tegbe.

== Plateau State ==
2023 Plateau State gubernatorial election
- 18 March 2023
- Registered: 2,789,528
Nominee	Caleb Mutfwang	Nentawe Yilwatda	Patrick Dakum
Party	PDP	APC	LP
Running mate	Josephine Piyo	Pam Bot-mang	Edward Gyang Pwajok
Popular vote	525,299	481,400	60,310
Percentage	48.62%	44.55%	5.58%
Governor before election
Simon Lalong
APC
Elected Governor
Caleb Mutfwang
PDP

Incumbent APC Governor Simon Lalong was re-elected to a second term in 2019 with 51.35% of the vote. He will be term-limited in 2023 and cannot seek re-election for a third term. Rumored APC candidates include Deputy Governor Sonni Gwanle Tyoden and Plateau Central Senator Dimka Ayuba. Rumored PDP candidates include former Pankshin/Kanke/Kanam Representative Timothy Golu and former Nigeria Immigration Service Comptroller-General and 2019 PDP Plateau Central senatorial nominee David Shikfu Parradang.

== Rivers State ==
2023 Rivers State gubernatorial election
- 18 March 2023
- Opinion polls
- Registered: 3,537,190
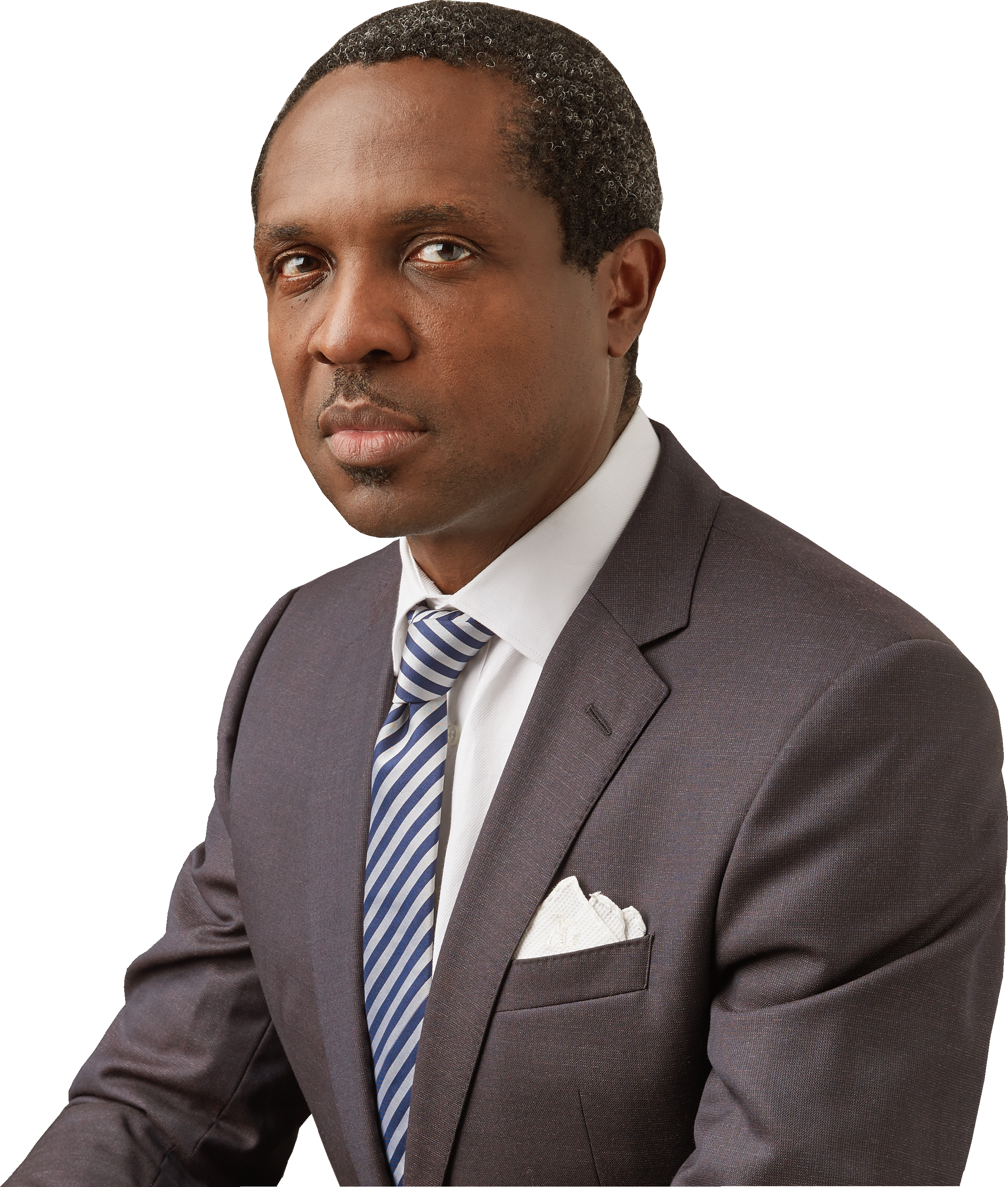
	PDP
Nominee	Siminalayi Fubara	Tonye Cole
Party	PDP	APC
Running mate	Ngozi Odu	Innocent Barikor
Popular vote	302,614	95,274
Percentage	62.53%	19.69%
	SDP	LP
Nominee	Magnus Abe	Beatrice Itubo
Party	SDP	LP
Running mate	Patricia Wudhiga Ogbonnaya	Kinanee Barikpoa
Popular vote	46,981	22,224
Percentage	9.71%	4.59%
Governor before election
Ezenwo Nyesom Wike
PDP
Elected Governor
Siminalayi Fubara
PDP

Incumbent PDP Governor Ezenwo Nyesom Wike was re-elected to a second term in 2019 with 83.28% of the vote. He will be term-limited in 2023 and cannot seek re-election for a third term. Rumored APC candidates include former Rivers South East Senator Magnus Abe and 2015 LP and 2007 AC gubernatorial nominee Tonye Princewill. Rumored PDP candidates include former Rivers State PDP Chairman Felix A. Obuah, former Minister of State for Industry, Trade and Investment and former SSG Kenneth Kobani, Senator for Rivers South East Barry Mpigi, former Senator for Rivers South East Lee Maeba, former Senator for Rivers South East Olaka Nwogu, and House of Representatives member for Khana/Gokana Dum Dekor.

== Sokoto State ==
2023 Sokoto State gubernatorial election
- 18 March 2023
- Registered: 2,172,056
Nominee	Ahmad Aliyu	Saidu Umar
Party	APC	PDP
Running mate	Idris Muhammad Gobir	Sagir Bafarawa
Popular vote	453,661	404,632
Percentage	52.48%	46.81%
Governor before election
Aminu Waziri Tambuwal
PDP
Elected Governor
Ahmad Aliyu
APC

Incumbent PDP Governor Aminu Tambuwal was re-elected to a second term in 2019 with 49.41% of the vote. He will be term-limited in 2023 and cannot seek re-election for a third term. Some rumored APC candidates include Abubakar Umar Gada (Senator for Sokoto East), Abdullahi Ibrahim Gobir (Senator for Sokoto East), Abdullahi Balarabe Salame (House of Representatives member for Gwadabawa/Illela), and Abubakar Shehu Tambuwal (former Senator for Sokoto South). For the PDP, rumored candidates include Garba Ila Gada (2012 DPP gubernatorial nominee and Senator for Sokoto North), Manir Dan Iya (Deputy Governor), Muktar Shagari (former Deputy Governor, former Minister of Water Resources, and nephew of former President Shehu Shagari), and Saidu Umar (Secretary to the State Government and former Commissioner of Finance).

== Taraba State ==
2023 Taraba State gubernatorial election
- 18 March 2023
- Registered: 2,022,374
Nominee	Kefas Agbu	Muhammad Sani Yahaya	Emmanuel Bwacha
Party	PDP	NNPP	APC
Running mate	Aminu Abdullahi Alkali	Danladi Yakubu Balutu	Iliyasu Kirim
Popular vote	302,614	202,277	142,502
Governor before election
Darius Ishaku
PDP
Elected Governor
Kefas Agbu
PDP

Incumbent PDP Governor Darius Ishaku was re-elected to a second term in 2019 with 57.21% of the vote. He will be term-limited in 2023 and cannot seek re-election for a third term. Some rumored PDP candidates include Victor Bala Kona (former Taraba State PDP Chairman), Joseph Albasu Kunini (House of Assembly member for Lau and Speaker of the House of Assembly), and Anthony George Manzo (former Senator for Taraba North).

For the APC, rumored candidates include Emmanuel Bwacha (Senator for Taraba South), Abubakar Sani Danladi (2019 APC gubernatorial nominee and former Senator for Taraba North), and Saleh Mamman (former Minister of Power) along with others.

== Yobe State ==
2023 Yobe State gubernatorial election
- 18 March 2023
- Registered: 1,485,146
Nominee	Mai Mala Buni	Sharif Abdullahi
Party	APC	PDP
Running mate	Idi Barde Gubana	Abubakar Bashir Sadiq
Popular vote	317,113	124,259
Percentage	71.33%	27.95%
Governor before election
Mai Mala Buni
APC
Elected Governor
Mai Mala Buni
APC

Incumbent APC Governor Mai Mala Buni was elected to a first term in 2019 with 81.26% of the vote. He is eligible to run for re-election, but has not yet stated whether he will do so. A potential PDP candidate is 2019 PDP gubernatorial nominee Umar Iliya Damagum.

== Zamfara State ==
2023 Zamfara State gubernatorial election
- 18 March 2023
- Registered: 1,926,870
Nominee	Dauda Lawal	Bello Matawalle
Party	PDP	APC
Running mate	Mani Mallam Mummuni	Hassan Nasiha
Popular vote	377,726	311,976
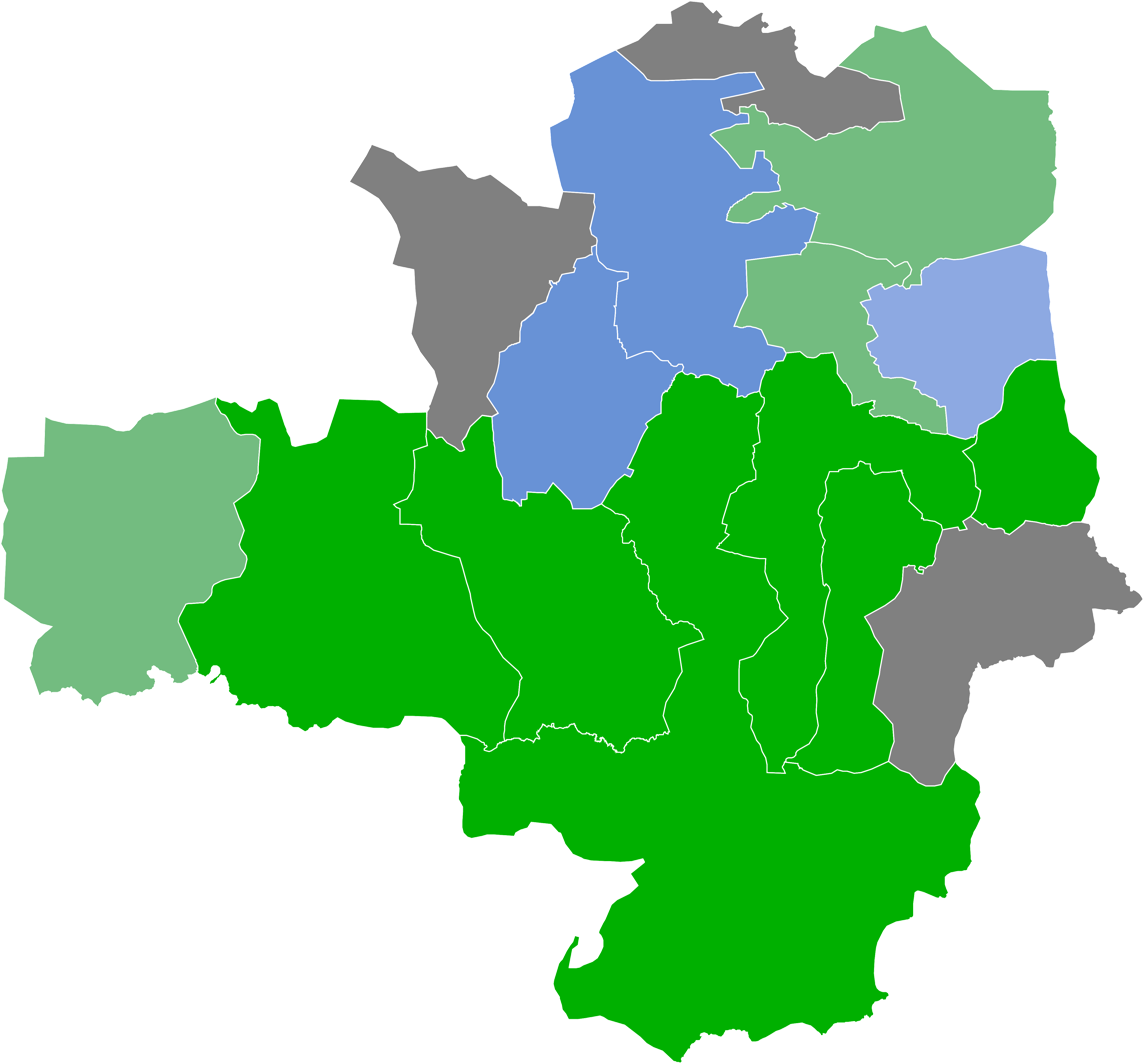
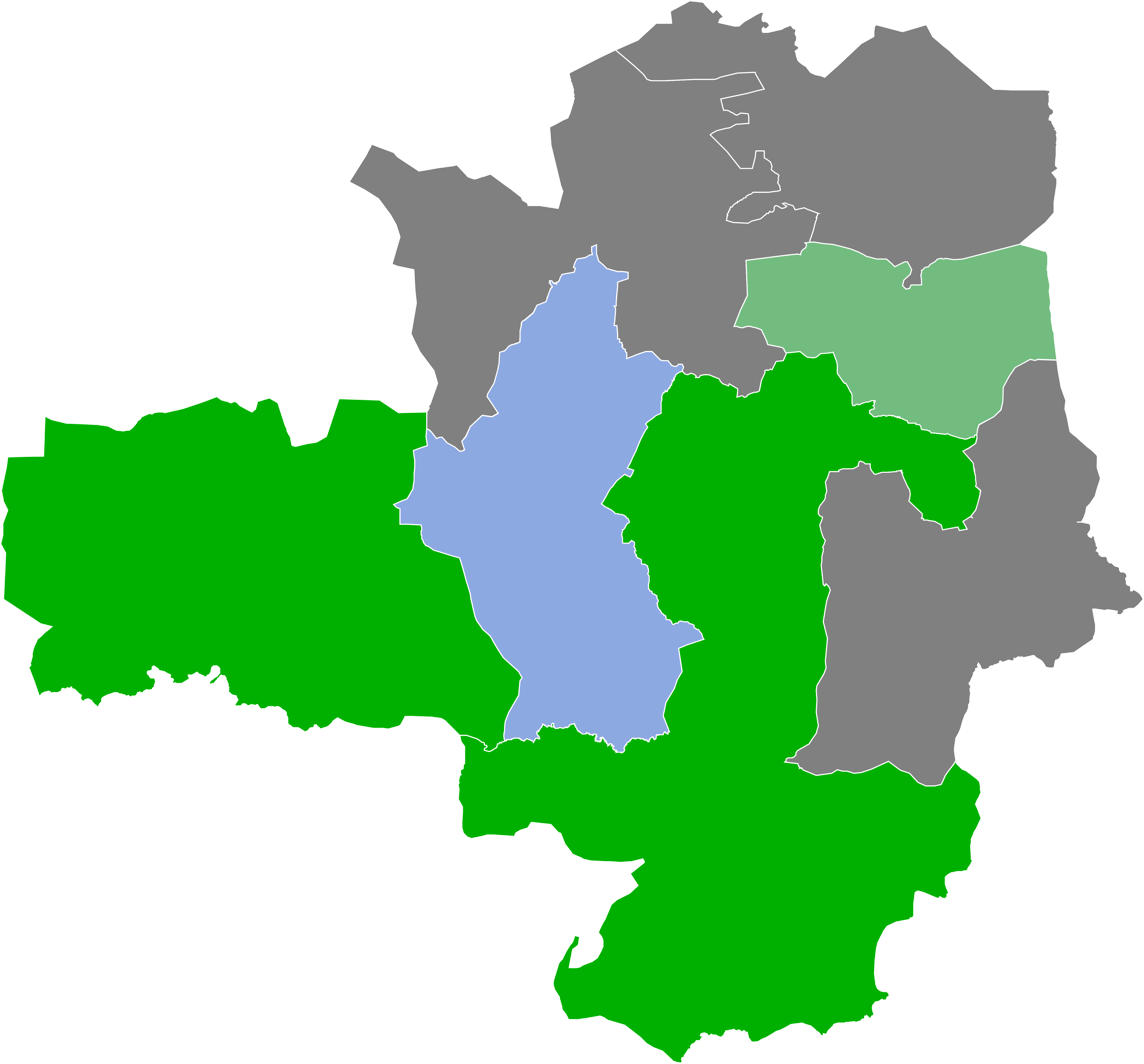
- LGA results Matawalle: 50–60% 60–70% Lawal: 50–60% 60–70% Incomplete results
Governor before election
Bello Matawalle
APC
Elected Governor
Dauda Lawal
PDP

Incumbent PDP-turned-APC Governor Bello Matawalle was elected to a first term in 2019 after a court decision. He is eligible to run for re-election, but has not yet stated whether he will do so. A potential PDP candidate is Deputy Governor Mahdi Aliyu Mohammed Gusau.
