= 2023 Nigerian Senate elections in Ebonyi State =

2023 Senate elections in Ebonyi

- 25 February 2023

All 3 Ebonyi State seats in the Senate of Nigeria
	Majority party
Party	PDP
Last election	3
Seats before	3
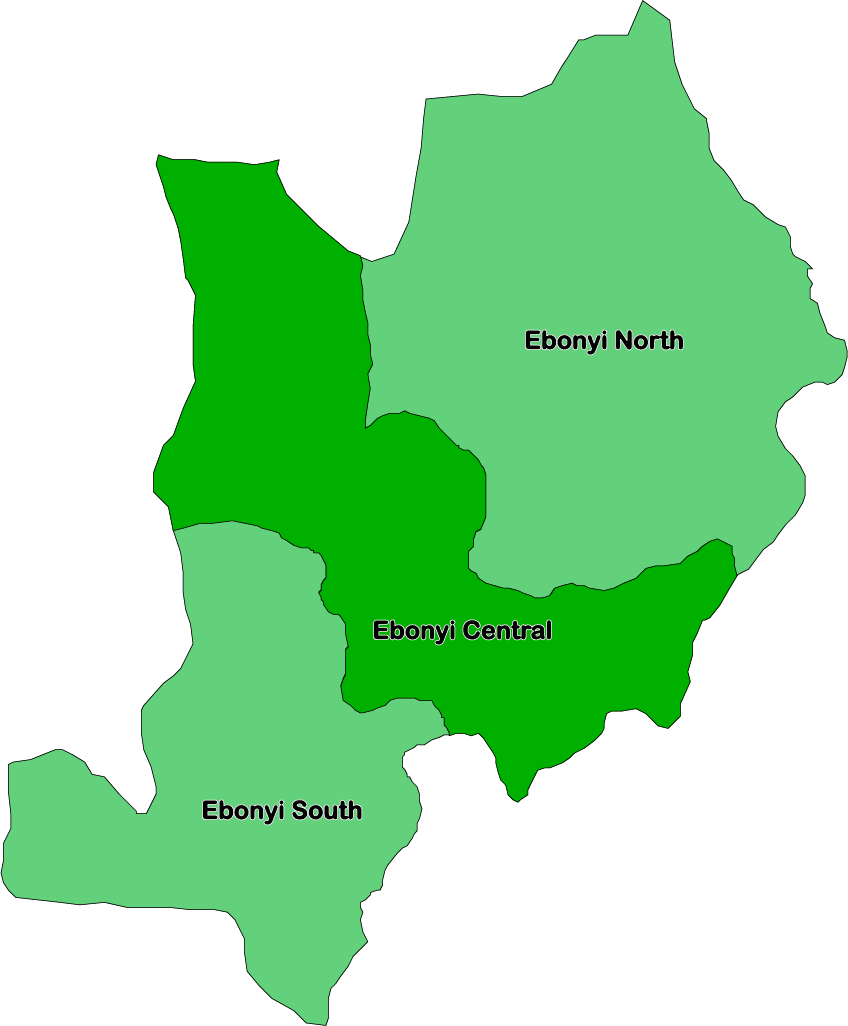
- PDP incumbent retiring PDP incumbent running for re-election

The 2023 Nigerian Senate elections in Ebonyi State were held on 25 February 2023, to elect the three federal Senators from Ebonyi State, one from each of the state's three senatorial districts.

The elections coincided with the 2023 presidential election, as well as other elections to the Senate and elections to the House of Representatives; with state elections being held two weeks later.

Primaries were held between 4 April and 9 June 2022.

== Background ==
In the previous Senate elections, two of three incumbent senators were returned with Joseph Ogba (PDP-Central) and Sam Egwu (PDP-North) winning re-election while Sonni Ogbuoji (APC-South) retired to unsuccessfully run for governor.

In the South district, Michael Ama Nnachi regained the seat for the PDP with 79% of the vote; the PDP held the other two seats as Ogba was re-elected with 56% of the vote in the Central district while Egwu was returned with 67% in the North district. These results were a part of a continuation of the PDP's control of the state as Governor Dave Umahi was re-elected with over 73% of the vote in the gubernatorial election and the party won a majority in the House of Assembly.

However, the PDP did lose one House of Representatives seat to the APC and although the state was easily won by PDP presidential nominee Atiku Abubakar, it still swung towards Buhari compared to 2015 and had lower turnout.

== Overview ==
Affiliation	Party		Total
Affiliation	PDP	APC	Total
Previous Election	3	0	3
Before Election	3	0	3
After Election	0	3	3

== Summary ==
District	Incumbent		Results	
District	Incumbent	Party	Status	Candidates
Ebonyi Central	Joseph Ogba	PDP	Incumbent retired New member elected APC gain	▌ ✓ Kenneth Eze (APC); ▌Lazarus Ogbe (PDP)
Ebonyi North	Sam Egwu	PDP	Incumbent lost re-election New member elected APC gain	▌ ✓ Onyekachi Nwaebonyi (APC); ▌Sam Egwu (PDP)
Ebonyi South	Michael Ama Nnachi	PDP	Incumbent lost re-election New member elected APC gain	▌ ✓ Dave Umahi (APC); ▌Ifeanyi Eleje (APGA); ▌Linus Abaa Okorie (LP); ▌Michael Ama Nnachi (PDP)

== Ebonyi Central ==
2023 Ebonyi Central Senatorial District election
- 25 February 2023
Nominee	Kenneth Eze	Lazarus Ogbe
Party	APC	PDP
Senator before election
Joseph Ogba
PDP
Elected Senator
Engr Kenneth C. Eze

The Ebonyi Central Senatorial District covers the local government areas of Ezza North, Ezza South, Ikwo, and Ishielu. The incumbent Joseph Ogba (PDP) was elected with 55.6% of the vote in 2019. In January 2022, Ogba announced that he would run for governor of Ebonyi State instead of seeking re-election.

=== Primary Elections ===
==== All Progressives Congress ====
On 20 April 2022, the APC National Executive Committee announced the party's schedule for senatorial primaries, setting its expression of interest form price at ₦3 million and nomination form price at ₦17 million with a 50% discount for candidates younger than 40 while women and candidates with disabilities get free nomination forms. Forms were to be sold from 26 April to 6 May until the deadline was later extended to 10 May then 12 May. After the submission of nomination forms by 13 May, candidates were screened by a party committee on 14 and 15 May while 18 May was the date for the screening appeal process. Ward congresses and LGA congresses were set for 16 and 17 May to elect delegates for the primary. Candidates approved by the screening process advanced to a primary set for 27 May, in concurrence with other APC senatorial primaries; challenges to the result could be made on 28 May.

The primary in Onueke resulted in Kenneth Eze—the Ezza South Local Government Chairman—emerging as the nominee unopposed.

==== People's Democratic Party ====
On 16 March 2022, the national PDP announced its senatorial primary timetable, setting its expression of interest form price at ₦1 million and the nomination form price at ₦20 million with a 50% discount for candidates between 25 and 30. Forms were to be sold until 1 April but the party later extended the deadline four times before reaching a final deadline of 22 April. After the submission of nomination forms by 25 April, candidates were screened by a party committee on 27 April while 2 May was the rescheduled date for the screening appeal process. Ward congresses were set for 29 April and LGA congresses were rescheduled for 10 May to elect delegates for the primary. Candidates approved by the screening process advanced to a primary set for 23 May, in concurrence with other PDP senatorial primaries but due to often violently enforced Monday stay-at-home orders by separatists, southeastern state parties held their primaries on 24 May; challenges to the result could be made on 25 May.

Primary results showed Lazarus Ogbe—former MHR for Ezza South/Ikwo and former Commissioner for Intergovernmental Affairs—emerging as the nominee over former Minister of Culture and Tourism Frank Ogbuewu and other candidates in a landslide. However, the national PDP initially attempt to nullify the senatorial primaries; the national party later backtracked amid outcry from victorious candidates (including Ogbe) and INEC listed Ogbe as the legitimate nominee.

PDP primary results
Party	Candidate	Votes	%
PDP	Lazarus Ogbe	153	94.44%
PDP	Frank Ogbuewu	4	2.47%
PDP	Lawrence Nwuruku	3	1.85%
PDP	Tobias Chukwu	1	0.62%
PDP	Hyginus Nwokwu	1	0.62%
Total votes		162	100.00%

=== General election ===
==== Results ====
2023 Ebonyi Central Senatorial District election
Party	Candidate	Votes	%
AA	Ephraim Nwonu		
ADC	Henry Ikechukwu Ukpabi		
APC	Kenneth Eze		
APGA	Emmanuel Uzor Onwe		
LP	Lawrence Nwuruku		
NRM	Stanley Ogechukwu Ogodo		
New Nigeria Peoples Party	Benjis Otubo Okechukwu		
PDP	Laz Ogbe		
SDP	Daniel Mgbada		
YPP	Sunday Nwonu		
Total votes			100.00%
Invalid or blank votes			N/A
Turnout			

== Ebonyi North ==
2023 Ebonyi North Senatorial District election
- 25 February 2023
Nominee	Onyekachi Nwaebonyi	Sam Egwu
Party	APC	PDP
Senator before election
Sam Egwu
PDP
Elected Senator
TBD

The Ebonyi North Senatorial District covers the local government areas of Abakaliki, Ebonyi, Izzi, and Ohaukwu. The incumbent Sam Egwu (PDP), who was elected with 66.8% of the vote in 2019, is seeking re-election.

=== Primary elections ===
==== All Progressives Congress ====
On 20 April 2022, the APC National Executive Committee announced the party's schedule for senatorial primaries, setting its expression of interest form price at ₦3 million and nomination form price at ₦17 million with a 50% discount for candidates younger than 40 while women and candidates with disabilities get free nomination forms. Forms were to be sold from 26 April to 6 May until the deadline was later extended to 10 May then 12 May. After the submission of nomination forms by 13 May, candidates were screened by a party committee on 14 and 15 May while 18 May was the date for the screening appeal process. Ward congresses and LGA congresses were set for 16 and 17 May to elect delegates for the primary. Candidates approved by the screening process advanced to a primary set for 27 May, in concurrence with other APC senatorial primaries; challenges to the result could be made on 28 May.

The primary at the local government headquarters of Abakaliki LGA resulted in Onyekachi Nwaebonyi—former Commissioner for Capital City Development and former state PDP Chairman—emerging as the nominee over former MHR Elizabeth Ogbaga in a landslide. After the primary, Nwaebonyi stated that he 'would focus on youth empowerment and capacity building' and thanked Governor Dave Umahi for his support.

APC primary results
Party	Candidate	Votes	%
APC	Onyekachi Nwaebonyi	272	97.84%
APC	Elizabeth Ogbaga	6	2.16%
Total votes		278	100.00%
Invalid or blank votes		1	N/A
Turnout		279	100.00%

==== People's Democratic Party ====
On 16 March 2022, the national PDP announced its senatorial primary timetable, setting its expression of interest form price at ₦1 million and the nomination form price at ₦20 million with a 50% discount for candidates between 25 and 30. Forms were to be sold until 1 April but the party later extended the deadline four times before reaching a final deadline of 22 April. After the submission of nomination forms by 25 April, candidates were screened by a party committee on 27 April while 2 May was the rescheduled date for the screening appeal process. Ward congresses were set for 29 April and LGA congresses were rescheduled for 10 May to elect delegates for the primary. Candidates approved by the screening process advanced to a primary set for 23 May, in concurrence with other PDP senatorial primaries but due to often violently enforced Monday stay-at-home orders by separatists, southeastern state parties held their primaries on 24 May; challenges to the result could be made on 25 May.

On the primary date, Egwu was renominated at the state PDP secretariat in Abakaliki; he won unanimously over Ojemba Chikodili Fidelis Mbam and Emeka Otozi, who both boycotted the primary and rejected the results. After the primary, Egwu praised the primary's conduct and thanked delegates. However, the national PDP initially attempt to nullify the senatorial primaries; the national party later backtracked amid outcry from victorious candidates and INEC listed Egwu as the legitimate nominee. Mbam approached the judiciary to challenge the results but his case and appeals were dismissed by rulings from a High Court, Court of Appeals, and the Supreme Court by November.

=== Campaign ===
In review of the campaign in December 2022, reporting from The Nation categorized Nwaebonyi as the frontrunner due to clan and regional dynamics that work against Egwu's third term bid. Pundits also contend that the APC could be boosted in the district as its gubernatorial nominee—Francis Nwifuru—is a native of the area.

=== General election ===
==== Results ====
2023 Ebonyi North Senatorial District election
Party	Candidate	Votes	%
AA	Ikeria Solomon Chibuike		
ADC	Samuel Igum Nwojiji		
APC	Onyekachi Nwaebonyi		
APGA	Silas Chibueze Nwidembia		
LP	Vincent Chukwu Ejiofor		
NRM	Solomon Igwe Otubo		
New Nigeria Peoples Party	Ambrose Nwizi Nwokoro		
PDP	Sam Egwu		
SDP	Destiny U. Nwodom		
Total votes			100.00%
Invalid or blank votes			N/A
Turnout			

== Ebonyi South ==
2023 Ebonyi South Senatorial District election
- 25 February 2023
Nominee	Dave Umahi	Ifeanyi Eleje
Party	APC	APGA
Nominee	Linus Abaa Okorie	Michael Ama Nnachi
Party	LP	PDP
Senator before election
Michael Ama Nnachi
PDP
Elected Senator
TBD

The Ebonyi South Senatorial District covers the local government areas of Afikpo North, Afikpo South, Ivo, Ohaozara, and Onicha. The incumbent Michael Ama Nnachi (PDP), who was elected with 78.8% of the vote in 2019, is seeking re-election.

=== Primary elections ===
==== All Progressives Congress ====
On 20 April 2022, the APC National Executive Committee announced the party's schedule for senatorial primaries, setting its expression of interest form price at ₦3 million and nomination form price at ₦17 million with a 50% discount for candidates younger than 40 while women and candidates with disabilities get free nomination forms. Forms were to be sold from 26 April to 6 May until the deadline was later extended to 10 May then 12 May. After the submission of nomination forms by 13 May, candidates were screened by a party committee on 14 and 15 May while 18 May was the date for the screening appeal process. Ward congresses and LGA congresses were set for 16 and 17 May to elect delegates for the primary. Candidates approved by the screening process advanced to a primary set for 27 May, in concurrence with other APC senatorial primaries; challenges to the result could be made on 28 May.

Prior to the primary, Governor Dave Umahi reportedly issued a directive for aspirants to step down in favour of a single candidate; however, Ann Agom-Eze refused to drop out for Austin Umahi—a former PDP official and brother of Governor Dave Umahi. On the original primary date, Austin Umahi defeated Agom-Eze by a wide margin and thanked delegates after the results were announced. Despite gratitude in victory, Austin Umahi was revealed to have been a placeholder for his brother as Austin Umahi withdrew from the nomination and an impromptu rerun primary was won by Dave Umahi unopposed on 10 June. However, the sudden primary ruled to be illegitimate by a High Court as Agom-Eze's name was not on the ballot and INEC did not list Dave Umahi on its provisional nominee list in June. In response, the state APC initially claimed that INEC had made an error before changing course and conducting a new rerun primary at the local government headquarters of Afikpo North LGA on 1 August; Dave Umahi easily won but Agom-Eze continued to claim that the rerun primaries should not have allowed new candidates and thus she was the rightful nominee. Due to her claims, the Ebonyi APC expelled Agom-Eze for 'rebellious and unruly behaviour' as she is allegedly "being bankrolled by the opposition party." In response, Agom-Eze claimed that she faced persistent harassment and death threats due to her opposition to Umahi. Her lawsuit eventually made its way to the Supreme Court in December, which ruled in favour of Umahi.

Original primary results

APC primary results
Party	Candidate	Votes	%
APC	Austin Umahi	279	98.24%
APC	Ann Agom-Eze	5	1.76%
Total votes		284	100.00%

APC rerun primary results
Party	Candidate	Votes	%
APC	Dave Umahi	250	93.28%
APC	Austin Umahi (withdrawn)	10	3.73%
APC	Chiko Elizabeth Nwakaego	5	1.87%
APC	Ibiam Margret Ezenwanyi	3	1.12%
APC	Ann Agom-Eze	0	0.00%
Total votes		268	100.00%
Invalid or blank votes		7	N/A
Turnout		275	100.00%

==== People's Democratic Party ====
On 16 March 2022, the national PDP announced its senatorial primary timetable, setting its expression of interest form price at ₦1 million and the nomination form price at ₦20 million with a 50% discount for candidates between 25 and 30. Forms were to be sold until 1 April but the party later extended the deadline four times before reaching a final deadline of 22 April. After the submission of nomination forms by 25 April, candidates were screened by a party committee on 27 April while 2 May was the rescheduled date for the screening appeal process. Ward congresses were set for 29 April and LGA congresses were rescheduled for 10 May to elect delegates for the primary. Candidates approved by the screening process advanced to a primary set for 23 May, in concurrence with other PDP senatorial primaries but due to often violently enforced Monday stay-at-home orders by separatists, southeastern state parties held their primaries on 24 May; challenges to the result could be made on 25 May.

On the primary date, Ama Nnachi was renominated in Afikpo North; he won in a landslide over Batholomew Olughu and Linus Chinedu Okorie. However, the national PDP initially attempt to nullify the senatorial primaries; the national party later backtracked amid outcry from victorious candidates and INEC listed Ama Nnachi as the legitimate nominee.

PDP primary results
Party	Candidate	Votes	%
PDP	Michael Ama Nnachi	152	98.70%
PDP	Batholomew Olughu	1	0.65%
PDP	Linus Chinedu Okorie	1	0.65%
Total votes			100.00%

=== Campaign ===
Analysis at the start of the official campaign period in early October categorized the election as a four-way race between Ama Nnachi, APGA nominee Ifeanyi Eleje, LP nominee Linus Abaa Okorie, and Umahi. Pundits noted LGA-based regional dynamics along with potential paths of victory for the major contenders. Later that month, national attention turned to the race due to the reported kidnapping of Okorie by gunman on 16 October; however, a later police statement stated that he had been arrested and detained. The LP protested the arrest as political persecution by Umahi and critics labeled the arrest as another example of governors using security forces to abuse the opposition. At the end of that month, an analysis piece from The Guardian also focused on regional dynamics as Eleje and Ama Nnachi are from Afikpo while Okorie and Umahi are from the Ivo-Ohaozara-Onicha axis. The report also reviewed the Okorie-Umahi political relationship from 2011 before reviewing attempts to free Okorie from detention. The election was also categorized as one of several examples of incumbent governors in competitive Senate races.

By November, the campaign became a focal point for criticism of Umahi's alleged authoritarianism as Okorie remained detained until 29 November and Eleje accused security forces of "not allowing the citizens' freedom of expression." These events along with criticism from the PDP and anti-Umahi APC members led observers to label state security forces as effectively Umahi's private militia. In an electoral analysis piece in December 2022, reporters from The Nation stated that Okorie's detention had backfired on Umahi amid public outcry, especially in Onicha—which is both Okorie's native LGA and electorally crucial to win the district. Later that month, a Daily Trust article on the race repeated previous issues for Umahi due to regional dynamics, but also contended that Okorie's detention had hurt his campaigning and Ama Nnachi lacked significant political clout.

=== General election ===
==== Results ====
2023 Ebonyi South Senatorial District election
Party	Candidate	Votes	%
AA	Reuben Uche Egwu		
ADC	Macson Innocent Akpanwaze		
APC	Dave Umahi		
APGA	Ifeanyi Eleje		
LP	Linus Abaa Okorie		
NRM	Levi Ajah Ibeabuchi		
New Nigeria Peoples Party	Leo Ogbonnia Idam		
PDP	Michael Ama Nnachi		
SDP	Kelechi Nnachi Olughu		
YPP	Rhoda Ebere Nwamini		
Total votes			100.00%
Invalid or blank votes			N/A
Turnout			

== See also ==
- 2023 Nigerian Senate election
- 2023 Nigerian elections
