= Nigerian National Assembly delegation from Ebonyi =

Ebonyi's delegation in Nigeria's National Assembly

The Nigerian National Assembly delegation from Ebonyi State comprises three Senators and six Representatives.

== Assemblies ==
=== 6th Assembly ===
The 6th National Assembly (2007–2011) was inaugurated on 5 June 2007. Senators representing Ebonyi State in the 6th Assembly were:

Senator	Constituency	Party
Anthony Agbo	Ebonyi North	People's Democratic Party ( PDP )
Anyimchukwu Ude	Ebonyi South	People's Democratic Party ( PDP )
Julius Ucha	Ebonyi Central	People's Democratic Party ( PDP )

Representatives in the 6th Assembly were:

Representative	Constituency	Party
Chima Innocent Ugo	Ikwo/Ezzra South	People's Democratic Party (PDP)
Elizabeth Ogbaga	Ohaukwu/Ebonyi	People's Democratic Party (PDP)
Paulinus Igwe Nwagu	Ezzra North/Ishielu	People's Democratic Party (PDP)
Okereke D. Onuabunchi	Ivo/Ohaozara/Onicha	People's Democratic Party (PDP)
Omo Christopher Isu	Afikpo North/Afikpo South	People's Democratic Party (PDP)
Sylvester Ogbaga	Abakaliki/Izzi	People's Democratic Party (PDP)

=== 7th Assembly ===
The 7th Nigeria National Assembly (2011–2015) was inaugurated on 6 June 2011. Senators representing Ebonyi State in the 7th Assembly were:

Senator	Constituency	Party
SEN. NWANKWO Chris Chukwuma	Ebonyi North	People's Democratic Party ( PDP )
SEN. OGBUOJI Sonni	Ebonyi South	People's Democratic Party ( PDP )
SEN. NWAGU Igwe Paulinus	Ebonyi Central	People's Democratic Party ( PDP )

Representatives in the 7th Assembly were:

Representative	Constituency	Party
HON. OKWURU Chukwuemeka Tobias	Ikwo/Ezza South	People's Democratic Party (PDP)
HON. PETER Oge Ali	Ohaukwu/Ebonyi	People's Democratic Party (PDP)
HON. PETER Edeh Onyemaechi	Ezza North/Ishielu	All Nigeria Peoples Party (ANPP)
HON. OKORIE Linus	Ivo/Ohaozara/Onicha	People's Democratic Party (PDP)
HON. OMO Christopher Isu	Afikpo North/Afikpo South	People's Democratic Party (PDP)
HON. OGBAGA O. Sylvester	Abakaliki/Izzi	People's Democratic Party (PDP)

=== 8th Assembly ===
The 8th National Assembly (2015 till 2019) Senators representing Ebonyi State in the 8th Assembly are:[3]

Senator	Constituency	Party
Sen. Sam Egwu	Ebonyi North	People's Democratic Party ( PDP )
Sen. Sonni Ogbuoji	Ebonyi South	People's Democratic Party ( PDP )
Sen. Joseph Ogba	Ebonyi Central	People's Democratic Party ( PDP )

=== 9th Assembly ===
The 9th National Assembly (2019 till date) Senators representing Ebonyi State in the 9th Assembly are:[3]

Senator	Constituency	Party
Sen. Sam Egwu	Ebonyi North	People's Democratic Party ( PDP )
Sen. Michael Ama-Nnachi	Ebonyi South	People's Democratic Party ( PDP )
Sen. Joseph Ogba	Ebonyi Central	People's Democratic Party ( PDP )
