= List of education ministers of Nigeria =

Minister of Education
- Coat of arms of the Nigerian Government

- State flag of Nigeria
- Incumbent; Morufu Olatunji Alausa
- Federal Ministry of Education
- Member of: Federal Cabinet
- Appointer: The president

The minister of education of Nigeria is the head of the Federal Ministry of Education and a member of the Federal Executive Council.

Political party: NCNC AG NPN NPP APC PDP Military

Name (Born-Died)		Portrait	Term of office		Cabinet
First Republic
1	Aja Nwachukwu (1918–2001)		1958	1965	Balewa (I)
2	Richard Akinjide (1930–2020)		1965	1966	Balewa (II)
Military Government (1966–1979)
3	Wenike Opurum Briggs (1918–1987)		1966	1971	Gowon (Federal Executive Council)
4	Abudu Yesufu Eke (1923–)		October 1971	1975	Gowon (Federal Executive Council)
5	Ahmadu Ali (b. 1936)		August 1975	1978	Muhammed (Federal Executive Council) Obasanjo (Federal Executive Council)
6	Garrick Barilee Leton (1933–2013)		1978	1979	Obasanjo (Federal Executive Council)
Second Republic
7	Ihechukwu Madubuike (b. 1944)		December 1979	1981 (resigned)	Shagari (I)
8	Sylvester Ugoh (b. 1931)		1981	October 1983	Shagari (I)
9	Sunday Afolabi (1931–2004)		October 1983	December 1983	Shagari (II)
Military Government (1983–1993)
10	Yarima Ibrahim Abdullahi (b. 1939)		January 1984	1985	Buhari (Federal Executive Council)
11	Abdullahi Ibrahim (1939–2021)		1985	August 1985	Buhari (Federal Executive Council)
12	Jibril Aminu (b. 1939)		1985	1989	Babangida (Federal Executive Council)
13	Babs Fafunwa (1923–2010)		1990	1992	Babangida (Federal Executive Council)
14	Ben Nwabueze (1931–2023)		January 1993 (secretary)	August 1993	Babangida (Federal Executive Council)
Third Republic (Interim National Government)
15	Abraham Imogie (b. 1945)		August 1993	November 1993	Shonekan (I)
Military Government (1993–1999)
16	Iyorchia Ayu (b. 1952)		26 November 1993	1995	Abacha (Federal Executive Council)
17	M T Liman (–2012)		1995	1997	Abacha (Federal Executive Council)
18	Dauda Birma (1940–2021)		December 1997	1998	Abubakar (Federal Executive Council)
19	Samuel Olaiya Oni (1941–2015)		August 1998	June 1999	Abubakar (Federal Executive Council)
Fourth Republic
19	Tunde Adeniran (b. 1945)		June 1999	31 January 2001	Obasanjo (I)
20	Babalola Borishade (1946–2017)		8 February 2001	May 2003	Obasanjo (I)
21	Fabian Osuji (1942–2024)		July 2003	22 March 2005 (sacked)	Obasanjo (II)
22	Chinwe Obaji (b. 1951)		June 2005	21 June 2006 (sacked)	Obasanjo (II)
23	Oby Ezekwesili (b. 1963)		21 June 2006	April 2007	Obasanjo (II)
24	Igwe Aja-Nwachukwu (1952–2015)		26 July 2007	17 December 2008	Yar'Adua (I)
25	Sam Egwu (b. 1954)		17 December 2008	17 March 2010	Jonathan (I)
26	Ruqayyah Ahmed Rufa'i (b. 1958)		6 April 2010	11 September 2013 (sacked)	Jonathan (II)
27	Nyesom Wike (b. 1967)		11 September 2013 (supervising)	9 July 2014	Jonathan (II)
28	Ibrahim Shekarau (b. 1955)		9 July 2014	November 2015	Jonathan (II)
29	Adamu Adamu (b. 1954)		11 November 2015	29 May 2023	Buhari (I • II)
35	Tahir Mamman (b. 1954)		21 August 2023	23 October 2024	Tinubu (I)
36	Tunji Alausa		23 October 2024	Incumbent	Tinubu

== Ministers of State for Education ==
The following people acted as Ministers of State for Education:

- Bala Usman (1979 to 1982)
- Elizabeth Iyase (1979 to 1982)
- L. A. Bamigbaiye (1982 to 1983)
- Abraham Imogie (January 1993 to November 1993)
- Alhaji Dongodaji (January 1993 to January 1994)
- Wada Nas (January 1995 to February 1995)
- Iyabo Anisulowo (February 1997 to December 1997)
- A. N. Achunine (December 1997 to June 1998)
- Alhaji S. Saadu (August 1998 to May 1999)
- Lawam Batagarawa (June 1999 to 2001)
- Bello Usman (February 2001 to June 2003)
- Hajia Bintu Musa (July 2003 to June 2005)
- Halima Tayo Alao (June 2005 to 2006)
- Grace Ogwuche (February 2006 to June 2006)
- Sayadi Abba Ruma (June 2006 to April 2007)
- Adewunmi Abitoye (June 2006 to May 2007)
- Jerry Agada (June 2007 to December 2008)
- Aishatu Jibril Dukku (June 2007 – 2010)

== See also ==
- Federal Ministry of Education (Nigeria)
