= List of governors of Ebonyi State =

Governor of Ebonyi State
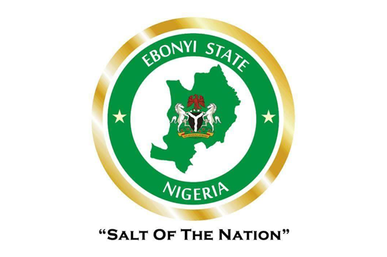
- Seal of Ebonyi State of Nigeria

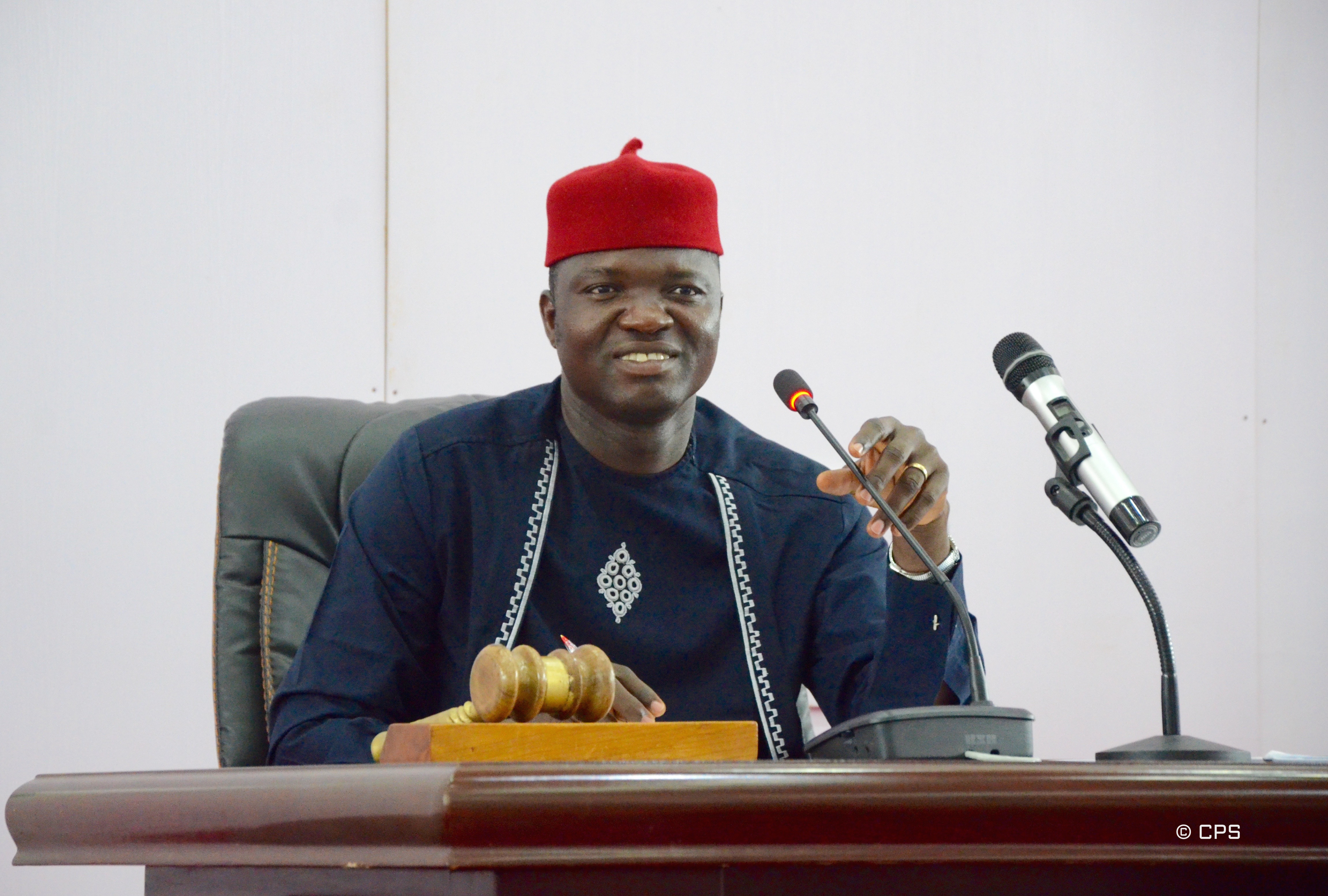
- Incumbent; Francis Nwifuru since May 2023
- Government of Ebonyi State
- Style: Governor (informal); His Excellency or Your Excellency (courtesy)
- Member of: Executive Council of Ebonyi State
- Reports to: President of Nigeria
- Seat: Abakaliki
- Appointer: Popular vote
- Term length: Four years, renewable once consecutively
- Constituting instrument: Constitution of Nigeria
- Inaugural holder: Sam Egwu
- Formation: October 1996
- Deputy: Deputy governor of Ebonyi State

Location of Ebonyi State in Nigeria

Ebonyi State, located in the South East geopolitical zone of Nigeria, has been governed by military administrators and elected governors since its creation on 1 October 1996. The state was created by the military government of Sani Abacha from parts of Abia State and Enugu State. Much of the territory that now constitutes Ebonyi had earlier formed part of the old Eastern Region, then the East Central State, before successive state-creation exercises placed it within Anambra and Imo State, and later within Enugu and Abia. The first administrator of Ebonyi State was Walter Feghabo, who served from October 1996 to August 1998, followed by Simeon Oduoye until the return to civilian rule in May 1999. With the start of the Fourth Republic, Sam Egwu of the Peoples Democratic Party (PDP) became the first elected governor and served from 1999 to 2007. He was succeeded by Martin Elechi (2007–2015), Dave Umahi (2015–2023), and Francis Nwifuru (2023–present).

== Background ==
Before Nigeria's independence in 1960, the territory that now forms Ebonyi State lay within the Eastern Region, one of the country's original administrative divisions. After the January 1966 coup, the regional system was brought under military control, and in May 1967 the federal military government dissolved the four regions and replaced them with twelve states. The former Eastern Region was broken up in 1967 into East Central State, Rivers State, and South-Eastern State. (Note: Nigeria's regional system of government was a decentralised political structure where the country was divided into autonomous regions—each with its own legislature, executive, and judiciary—allowing them to govern internal affairs and manage resources independently, while still operating under a central federal authority.) East Central State, with its capital at Enugu, existed until 3 February 1976. In 1976, the military government of Murtala Mohammed divided it into Anambra State and Imo State.

The territory that would later become Ebonyi was thereafter administered through the structures of Anambra and Imo States. A further state-creation exercise under Ibrahim Babangida in 1991 split Anambra to create Enugu State and split Imo to create Abia State. Ebonyi's immediate administrative antecedents were therefore the old Abia State and Enugu State. Both were among the nine states created in 1991 by the Babangida regime. On 1 October 1996, the Abacha regime created six additional states, including Ebonyi, which was carved out of Abia and Enugu.

== List of governors ==
Ebonyi State was officially created on 1 October 1996 following its separation from Abia and Enugu States. The first chief executive of the new state was Walter Feghabo, a military administrator who served from October 1996 until August 1998. He was succeeded by Simeon Oduoye, who remained in office until the handover to civilian rule in May 1999. During the Fourth Republic, Sam Egwu of the Peoples Democratic Party (PDP) became the state's first elected governor and served two terms from 29 May 1999 to 29 May 2007. He was succeeded by Martin Elechi, also of the PDP, who served from 29 May 2007 to 29 May 2015. Dave Umahi won the 2015 gubernatorial election as the PDP candidate and was re-elected in 2019. In November 2020, Umahi defected from the PDP to the All Progressives Congress (APC). A Federal High Court ordered his removal in March 2022, but appellate decisions later reversed or struck down attempts to unseat him and his deputy. Francis Nwifuru of the APC was elected in the 2023 gubernatorial election, and sworn in on 29 May 2023. He is the incumbent.

Heads of the government of Ebonyi State
Governor		Term in office (Note: For elected governors, the date of inauguration is listed.)	Party		Election	D. Governor
—	Walter Feghabo (b. 1956, d. 2025)	October 1996 – August 1998	—	Military administrator	—	Office did not exist
—	Simeon Oduoye	August 1998 – May 1999	—	Military administrator	—	Office did not exist
—	Sam Ominyi Egwu (b. 1954)	29 May 1999 – 29 May 2007		PDP	1999; 2003	Emmanuel Isu (May 1999 – May 2003)
—	Sam Ominyi Egwu (b. 1954)	29 May 1999 – 29 May 2007		PDP	1999; 2003	Chigozie Ogbu (May 2003 – May 2007)
Martin Elechi wearing a bright red cap, wire-rimmed glasses, and a black traditional tunic, looking downward in front of wood-paneled walls.	Martin Elechi (b. 1941)	29 May 2007 – 29 May 2015		PDP	2007; 2011	Chigozie Ogbu (May 2007 – May 2011)
Martin Elechi wearing a bright red cap, wire-rimmed glasses, and a black traditional tunic, looking downward in front of wood-paneled walls.	Martin Elechi (b. 1941)	29 May 2007 – 29 May 2015		PDP	2007; 2011	Dave Umahi (May 2011 – May 2015)
Formal head-and-shoulders portrait of David Umahi wearing rectangular glasses, a blue suit, white shirt, and patterned red-and-blue tie against a dark background.	David Nweze Umahi (b. 1963)	29 May 2015 – 29 May 2023		PDP	2015; 2019	Eric Kelechi Igwe
Formal head-and-shoulders portrait of David Umahi wearing rectangular glasses, a blue suit, white shirt, and patterned red-and-blue tie against a dark background.	David Nweze Umahi (b. 1963)	29 May 2015 – 29 May 2023		APC (from November 2020)	2015; 2019	Eric Kelechi Igwe
Francis Nwifuru sits behind a wood-paneled desk with a gavel and two microphones. He wears a red cap and a dark blue traditional-style shirt and raises one hand while seated in a black chair.	Francis Nwifuru (b. 1975)	29 May 2023 – Incumbent		APC	2023	Patricia Obila

== See also ==
- List of state governors of Nigeria
