= 2015 Nigerian Senate elections in Ebonyi State =

2015 Nigerian Senate election in Ebonyi State

The 2015 Nigerian Senate election in Ebonyi State was held on March 28, 2015, to elect members of the Nigerian Senate to represent Ebonyi State. Sam Egwu representing Ebonyi North, Joseph Ogba representing Ebonyi Central and Sonni Ogbuoji representing Ebonyi South all won on the platform of Peoples Democratic Party.

== Overview ==
Affiliation	Party		Total
Affiliation	PDP	APC	Total
Before Election			3
After Election	3	–	3

== Summary ==
District	Incumbent	Party	Elected Senator	Party
Ebonyi North			Sam Egwu	PDP
Ebonyi Central			Joseph Ogba	PDP
Ebonyi South			Sonni Ogbuoji	PDP

== Results ==
=== Ebonyi North ===
Peoples Democratic Party candidate Sam Egwu won the election, defeating All Progressives Congress candidate Pius Ekuma and other party candidates.

2015 Nigerian Senate election in Ebonyi State
Party	Candidate	Votes	%
PDP	Sam Egwu		
APC	Pius Ekuma		
Total votes			
PDP hold			

=== Ebonyi Central ===
Peoples Democratic Party candidate Joseph Ogba won the election, defeating All Progressives Congress candidate Anyigor Nwanchor and other party candidates.

2015 Nigerian Senate election in Ebonyi State
Party	Candidate	Votes	%
PDP	Joseph Ogba		
APC	Anyigor Nwanchor		
Total votes			
PDP hold			

=== Ebonyi South ===
Peoples Democratic Party candidate Sonni Ogbuoji won the election, defeating All Progressives Congress candidate John Arinze and other party candidates.

2015 Nigerian Senate election in Ebonyi State
Party	Candidate	Votes	%
PDP	Sonni Ogbuoji		
APC	John Arinze		
Total votes			
PDP hold			
