= 2019 Nigerian Senate elections in Ebonyi State =

2019 Nigerian Senate election in Ebonyi State

The 2019 Nigerian Senate election in Ebonyi State was held on February 23, 2019, to elect members of the Nigerian Senate to represent Ebonyi State. Michael Ama Nnachi representing Ebonyi South, Obinna Ogba representing Ebonyi Central and Sam Egwu representing Ebonyi North all won on the platform of Peoples Democratic Party.

== Overview ==
Affiliation	Party		Total
Affiliation	PDP	APC	Total
Before Election	3	0	3
After Election	3	0	3

== Summary ==
District	Incumbent	Party	Elected Senator	Party
Ebonyi South	Sonni Ogbuoji	PDP	Michael Ama-Nnach	PDP
Ebonyi Central	Joseph Ogba	PDP	Gabriel Suswam	PDP
Ebonyi North	Sam Egwu	PDP	Sam Egwu	PDP

== Results ==
=== Ebonyi South ===
A total of 9 candidates registered with the Independent National Electoral Commission to contest in the election. PDP candidate Michael Ama-Nnachi won the election, defeating APC candidate, Prince Nwaeze Onu and 7 other party candidates. Ama-Nnachi scored 103,751 votes, while APC candidate Onu scored 19,663 votes.

2019 Nigerian Senate election in Ebonyi State
Party	Candidate	Votes	%
PDP	Michael Ama-Nnachi	103,751	
APC	Prince Nwaeze Onu	19,663	
Others			
Total votes		131,638	100%
PDP hold			

=== Ebonyi Central ===
A total of 14 candidates registered with the Independent National Electoral Commission to contest in the election. PDP candidate, Joseph Ogba won the election, defeating APC candidate Julius Ucha and 12 other party candidates. Ogba pulled 62,452 votes, while APC candidate Ucha scored 46,672.

2019 Nigerian Senate election in Ebonyi State
Party	Candidate	Votes	%
PDP	Joseph Ogba	62,452	
APC	Julius Ucha	46,672	
Others			
Total votes		112,249	100%
PDP hold			

=== Ebonyi North ===
A total of 11 candidates registered with the Independent National Electoral Commission to contest in the election. PDP candidate Sam Egwu won the election, defeating APC candidate Mathias Adum. Egwu pulled 80,711 votes while his closest rival Adum pulled 38,734.

2019 Nigerian Senate election in Ebonyi State
Party	Candidate	Votes	%
PDP	Sam Egwu	80,711	
APC	Mathias Adum	38,734	
Others			
Total votes		120,869	100%
PDP hold			
