= 2007 Nigerian Senate elections in Ebonyi State =

The 2007 Nigerian Senate election in Ebonyi State was held on 21 April 2007, to elect members of the Nigerian Senate to represent Ebonyi State. Julius Ucha representing Ebonyi Central, Anyimchukwu Ude representing Ebonyi South and Anthony Agbo representing Ebonyi North all won on the platform of the People's Democratic Party.

== Overview ==
Affiliation	Party		Total
Affiliation	AC	PDP	Total
Before Election			3
After Election	0	3	3

== Summary ==
District	Incumbent	Party	Elected Senator	Party
Ebonyi Central			Julius Ucha	PDP
Ebonyi South			Anyimchukwu Ude	PDP
Ebonyi North			Anthony Agbo	PDP

== Results ==
=== Ebonyi Central ===
The election was won by Julius Ucha of the Peoples Democratic Party (Nigeria).

2007 Nigerian Senate election in Ebonyi State
Party	Candidate	Votes	%
PDP	Julius Ucha		
Total votes			
PDP hold			

=== Ebonyi South ===
The election was won by Anyimchukwu Ude of the Peoples Democratic Party (Nigeria).

2007 Nigerian Senate election in Ebonyi State
Party	Candidate	Votes	%
PDP	Anyimchukwu Ude		
Total votes			
PDP hold			

=== Ebonyi North ===
The election was won by Anthony Agbo of the Peoples Democratic Party (Nigeria).

2007 Nigerian Senate election in Ebonyi State
Party	Candidate	Votes	%
PDP	Anthony Agbo		
Total votes			
PDP hold			
