= Ebonyi South senatorial district =

Senatorial district in Ebonyi State, Nigeria

Ebonyi South (known historically as Afikpo Province) is one of three senatorial districts in Ebonyi State, Nigeria.

== Local governments and constituencies ==
=== Local government areas ===
Ebonyi South is made up of five (5) local government areas:

- Afikpo North
- Afikpo South (Edda)
- Ivo
- Ohaozara
- Onicha

=== Federal constituencies ===
The five Local Government Areas of Ebonyi South make up two Federal constituencies namely:

- Afikpo constituency - made up of Afikpo North & Afikpo South. Afikpo South is historically called Edda
- Ohanivo constituency - made up of Ohaozara, Onicha & Ivo. Ohanivo is an acronym gotten from creatively merging the names of the Local Governments that make up the constituency

== History ==
=== Afikpo province in the newly created Nigeria ===
Ebonyi South produced the first Governor of the Eastern Region Dr. Francis Akanu Ibiam, first lady of Nigeria Lady Uche Azikiwe, Nigeria's first minister of Education Onyiba Aja Nwachuku and more .

=== Afikpo province under Abia ===
During the time Ebonyi south (known then as Afikpo province) was as under Abia state, the province produced the first Executive Governor of Abia State, Dr Ogbonnaya Onu who is an indigene of present-day Ohaozara Local Government Area of Ebonyi State.

Also, ABIA is an acronym for the 4 most populous and industrialized places in the state at the time. These places were:

- A - Aba
- B - Bende
- I - Isuikwuato and
- A - Afikpo

Afikpo is now in Ebonyi State.

=== Afikpo province as Ebonyi South ===
Ebonyi South has produced one governor of Ebonyi state since its creation, in the person of Gov. Dave Umahi. The current senator representing Ebonyi South is Michael Ama Nnachi of the People's Democratic Party (PDP). And only this two, Afikpo Province has once produced the president of the Senate from 2000 to 2003 who is also once the secretary to the Government of the Federation from 2011 to 2015, also PDP presidential aspirant in 2023 election in the person of Sen. Anyim Pius Anyim, and so many others.

== Higher institutions ==
- Mater School of Nursing, Afikpo
- Akanu Ibiam Federal Polytechnic, Unwana, Afikpo
- Federal College of Agriculture, Ishiagu, Ivo
- Ebonyi State University School of Nursing and Midwifery, Uburu, Ohaozara

== Notable persons from Ebonyi South ==
- Anyim Pius Anyim, former Senate President of Nigeria and former Secretary General to the Federation
- Uche Azikiwe, pioneer First Lady of Nigeria and wife of Nigeria's First president Nnamdi Azikiwe
- Akanu Ibiam, first Governor of Nigeria's Eastern Region and predecessor of Chukwuemeka Ojukwu
- Samuel Eto'o, Cameroonian footballer, son of a migrant Afikpo father and Cameroonian mother
- Tekno, afropop singer, songwriter, record producer, performer
- Andy Chukwu, movie director, actor
- Ogbonnaya Onu, first Governor of Abia State, minister of Science & Technology
- Priscilla Ekwere Eleje, first female to have her signature appended on the Naira
- Patoranking, reggae and afropop singer, songwriter performer
- Sinach, gospel singer
- Chris Abani, Nigerian and American author
- Nwali Sylvester Ngwuta, Justice of the Supreme Court of Nigeria
- Igwe Aja Nwachukwu, former Nigeria Minister of Education from July 2007 to December 2008
- John Ogbu, Nigerian American anthropologist, "acting white" theorist
- Michael Nnachi Okoro, the former Bishop of the Roman Catholic Diocese of Abakaliki
- Michael Ama Nnachi, Senator representing Ebonyi South Senatorial District at the Nigerian 9th National Assembly
- Angela Okorie, actress
- Ogbonnaya Onu, first Executive Governor of Abia State, current Minister for Science and Technology
- Francis Otunta, Vice-Chancellor of Michael Okpara University of Agriculture, Umudike
- Anyimchukwu Ude, was Senator representing Ebonyi South constituency of Ebonyi State, Nigeria, in the Nigerian Senate from 29 May 2007 to 29 May 2011
- Dave Umahi, current minister of work in Nigeria, and former Executive Governor of Ebonyi State
- Sonni Ogbuoji, senator representing Ebonyi South from May 2011 to May 2019
- Francis Ogbonna Erishi Nwifuru, current Executive Governor of Ebonyi State.
