= 2015 Ebonyi State gubernatorial election =

5th gubernatorial election of Ebonyi State

- 11 April 2015
Nominee	Dave Umahi	Edward Nkwegu
Party	PDP	LP
Popular vote	289,867	124,817
Governor before election
Martin Elechi
PDP
Elected Governor
Dave Umahi
PDP

The 2015 Ebonyi State gubernatorial election was the 5th gubernatorial election of Ebonyi State. Held on 11 April 2015, the People's Democratic Party nominee Dave Umahi won the election, defeating Edward Nkwegu of the Labour Party.

== PDP primary ==
The Deputy Governor of Ebonyi State, Dave Umahi defeated 7 other contestants to clinch the party ticket. He won with 541 votes. Other contestants in the primary were Paulinus Igwe Nwagu, Aja Nwachukwu, Offia Nwali, Paul Okorie, Hycinth Ikpo, Michael Ude Udumanta and Onyebuchi Chukwu, who was absent. 592 delegates voted in the election.

=== Candidates ===
- Dave Umahi
- Paulinus Igwe Nwagu
- Aja Nwachukwu
- Offia Nwali
- Paul Okorie
- Hycinth Ikpo
- Michael Ude Udumanta
- Onyebuchi Chukwu

== LP primary ==
Edward Nkwegu, CEO of Edon Group clinched the party ticket.

== Other governorship aspirant and party ==
- Julius Ali Ucha, APC
- Augustine Nweze, SDP
- Agbo Anthony Oduma, APGA
- Elizabeth Nwakaego Akpa, PPA
- Gold Pascal Nwaigwe, ADC
- Grace Uduma-Eze, ID
- Uchenna Okocha Eze, ACPN

== Results ==
A total of 9 candidates contested in the election. Dave Umahi from the PDP won the election, defeating Edward Nkwegu from the LP.

2015 Ebonyi State gubernatorial election
Party	Candidate	Votes	%	±%
PDP	Dave Umahi	289,867		
LP	Edward Nkwegu	124,817		
PDP hold				

== Aftermath ==
After the election, Edward Nkwegu from the Labour Party challenged the outcome of the election at the Ebonyi State Governorship Elections Petitions Tribunal. The LP candidate told the tribunal to cancel the elections on the ground that the election was marred by irregularities and substantial non compliance with the provisions of the electoral act and some provisions of the Nigerian constitution. Edward Nkwegu also said that the election was marred by corrupt practices and that Dave Umahi did not score majority of the lawful votes cast. The tribunal dismissed the petition for lack of merit and upheld the election of Dave Umahi. The case was taken to the Appeal court, sitting in Enugu State. Delivering the judgement, the Appeal court affirmed the election of the PDP candidate, Dave Umahi and dismissed the appeal of the LP candidate for being functionally useless and lacking in merit. The case was also taken to Supreme court. On the judgement day, the Supreme court dismissed the petition for lacking merit.
