= List of people from Ebonyi State =

The following is a list of notable people whose state of origin is Ebonyi State, Nigeria.

== A ==
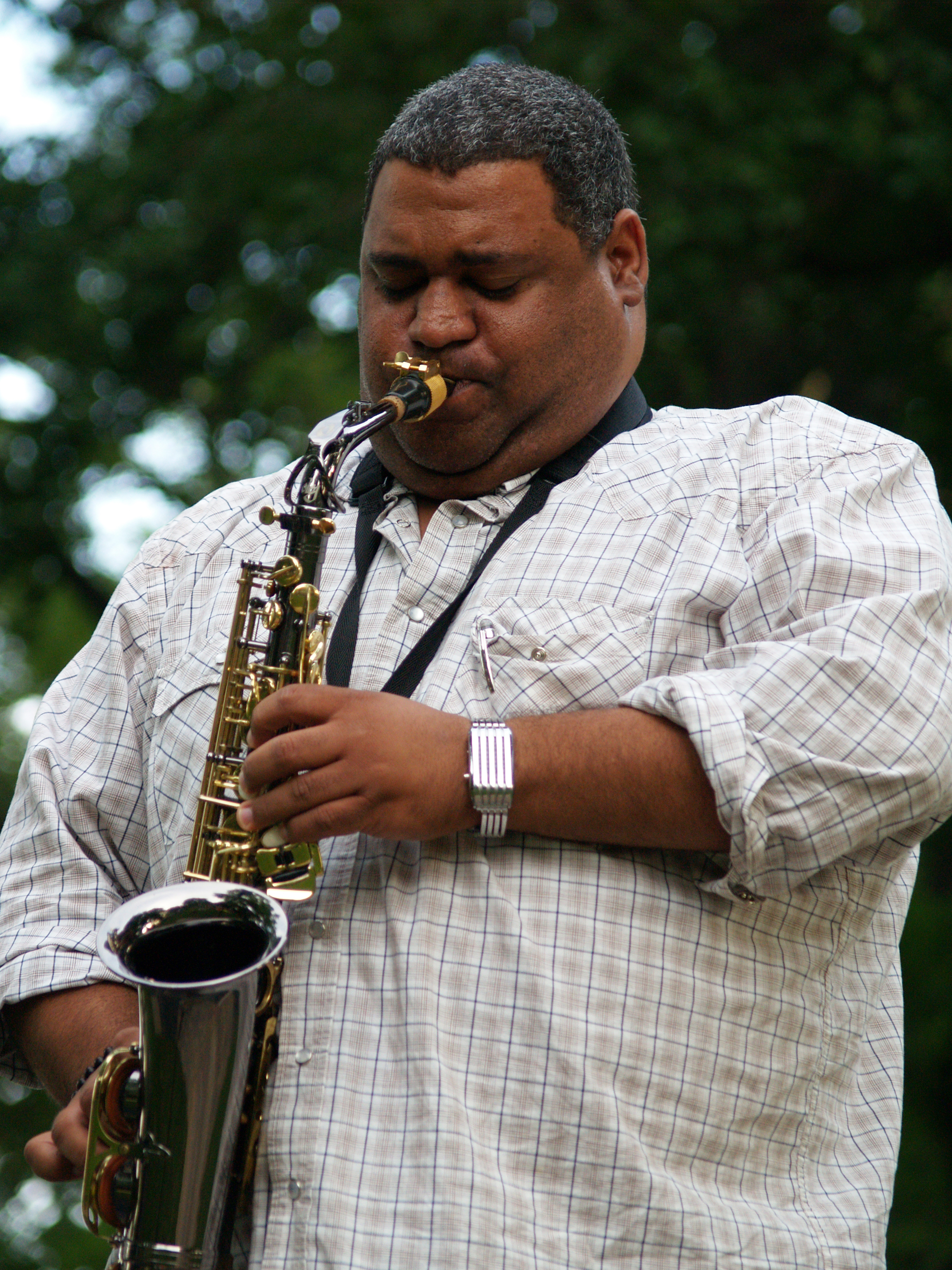
Chris Abani

- Chris Abani
- Anthony Agbo
- Anyim Pius Anyim, first president of the Nigerian Senate from Ebonyi State and first Secretary to Government of the Federation (SGF)
- Uche Azikiwe, professor and pioneer first lady of Nigeria and widow of Nigeria's first president Nnamdi Azikiwe

== C ==
- Andy Chukwu, actor, movie director
- Onyebuchi Chukwu, professor, former minister of health of the Federal Republic of Nigeria (April 2010 - October 2014)

== E ==
- Sam Egwu, first Civilian Governor of Ebonyi State (from 1999 to 2007)
- Chacha Eke, actress
- Priscilla Ekwere Eleje
- Martin Elechi, former Governor of Ebonyi state (from 2007 to 2015)
- Jennifer Ephraim, actress

== I ==
- Akanu Ibiam, former Governor of Eastern Region, Nigeria and predecessor to Chukwuemeka Odumegwu Ojukwu

== N ==
- Sylvanus Ngele, former Senator of the Federal Republic of Nigeria
- Nnenna Oti, Vice-Chancellor-elect of Federal University of Technology Owerri
- Nwali Sylvester Ngwuta, first Justice of the Supreme Court of Nigeria from Ebonyi State
- Igwe Aja-Nwachukwu, former Minister of Education
- Paulinus Igwe Nwagu, former Senator of the Federal Republic of Nigeria

== O ==
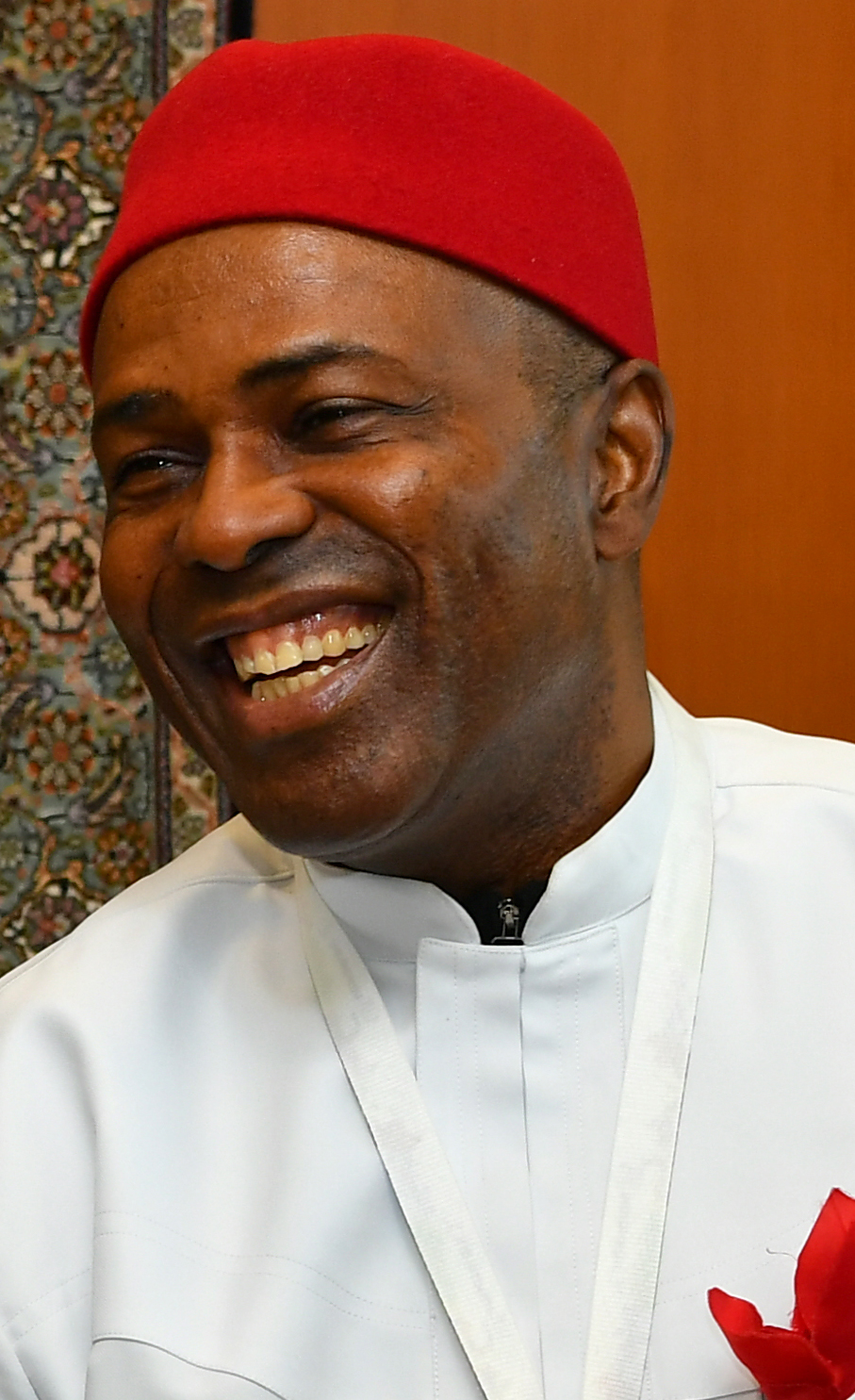
Ogbonnaya Onu

Angela Okorie

- Joseph Ogba, Senator of the Federal Republic of Nigeria
- Elizabeth Ogbaga, former member House of Representative
- Chigozie Ogbu, professor, former deputy governor of Ebonyi State and current Vice Chancellor Ebonyi State University Abakaliki
- John Ogbu, Nigerian American anthropologist, "acting white" theorist
- Frank Ogbuewu
- Sonni Ogbuoji, former Senator of the Federal Republic of Nigeria
- Michael Nnachi Okoro, the Bishop of the Roman Catholic Diocese of Abakaliki
- Angela Okorie, actress
- Francis Otunta, professor and Vice Chancellor Michael Okpara University Umudike
- Ogbonnaya Onu, first Executive Governor of Abia State, current Minister for Science and Technology
- Alex Ozone, Nigerian talent manager and show promoter

== P ==
- Patoranking, singer

== S ==
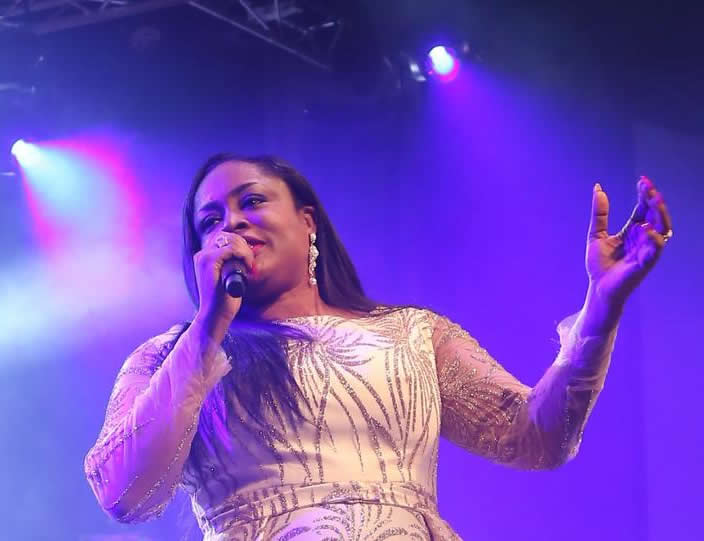
Sinach

- Cynthia Shalom, Actor, producer
- Sinach, gospel singer

== T ==
- Tekno, singer, record producer, dancer

== U ==
- Julius Ucha, former senator (from 2003 to 2011)
- Anyimchukwu Ude, former Senator of the Federal Republic of Nigeria
- Dave Umahi, former Governor of Ebonyi State
- Vincent Obasi Usulor, former Senator of the Federal Republic of Nigeria
