= Vincent Obasi Usulor =

Nigerian politician

Senator for Ebonyi Central
- In office 29 May 1999 – 29 May 2003
- Succeeded by: Julius Ucha

Personal details
- Born: Ebonyi State, Nigeria

Vincent Obasi Usulor is a Nigerian politician. He was elected Senator for the Ebonyi Central constituency of Ebonyi State, Nigeria at the start of the Nigerian Fourth Republic, running on the People's Democratic Party (PDP) platform. He took office on 29 May 1999.

== Career ==
He was to committees on Rules & Procedures, Industries, Science & Technology, Police Affairs, National Planning and Federal Capital Territory (vice chairman).

== See also ==
- List of people from Ebonyi State
