= Okorie Ani =

Nigerian politician

Okorie Anthony Ani is a Nigerian politician. He currently serve as a senator representing Ebonyi South senatorial district in Ebonyi state in the 10th National Assembly.
