= 2007 Ebonyi State gubernatorial election =

State election in Nigeria

- April 14, 2007
| Nominee | Martin Elechi | Ogbonnaya Onu |
| Party | PDP | ANPP |
| Popular vote | 506,444 | 28,579 |
Governor before election
Sam Egwu
PDP
Elected Governor
Martin Elechi
PDP

The 2007 Ebonyi State gubernatorial election was the 7th gubernatorial election of Ebonyi State. Held on April 14, 2007, the People's Democratic Party nominee Martin Elechi won the election, defeating Ogbonnaya Onu of the All Nigeria Peoples Party.

== Results ==
Martin Elechi from the People's Democratic Party won the election, defeating Ogbonnaya Onu from the All Nigeria Peoples Party. Registered voters was 929,375.

2007 Ebonyi State gubernatorial election
| Party | Candidate | Votes | % | ±% |
|---|---|---|---|---|
| PDP | Martin Elechi | 506,444 | | |
| ANPP | Ogbonnaya Onu | 28,579 | | |
| PDP hold | | | | |
