= 2011 Nigerian Senate elections in Ebonyi State =

2011 Nigerian Senate election in Ebonyi State

The 2011 Nigerian Senate election in Ebonyi State was held on April 9, 2011, to elect members of the Nigerian Senate to represent Ebonyi State. Chris Chukwuma Nwankwo representing Ebonyi North, Paulinus Igwe Nwagu representing Ebonyi Central and Sonni Ogbuoji representing Ebonyi South all won on the platform of Peoples Democratic Party.

== Overview ==
| Affiliation | Party | | Total |
| Affiliation | PDP | ACN | Total |
|---|---|---|---|
| Before Election | | | 3 |
| After Election | 3 | – | 3 |

== Summary ==
| District | Incumbent | Party | Elected Senator | Party |
|---|---|---|---|---|
| Ebonyi North | | | Chris Chukwuma Nwankwo | PDP |
| Ebonyi Central | | | Paulinus Igwe Nwagu | PDP |
| Ebonyi South | | | Sonni Ogbuoji | PDP |

== Results ==
=== Ebonyi North ===
Peoples Democratic Party candidate Chris Chukwuma Nwankwo won the election, defeating other party candidates.

2011 Nigerian Senate election in Ebonyi State
| Party | Candidate | Votes | % |
|---|---|---|---|
| PDP | Chris Chukwuma Nwankwo | | |
| Total votes | | | |
| PDP hold | | | |

=== Ebonyi Central ===
Peoples Democratic Party candidate Paulinus Igwe Nwagu won the election, defeating other party candidates.

2011 Nigerian Senate election in Ebonyi State
| Party | Candidate | Votes | % |
|---|---|---|---|
| PDP | Paulinus Igwe Nwagu | | |
| Total votes | | | |
| PDP hold | | | |

=== Ebonyi South ===
Peoples Democratic Party candidate Sonni Ogbuoji won the election, defeating party candidates.

2011 Nigerian Senate election in Ebonyi State
| Party | Candidate | Votes | % |
|---|---|---|---|
| PDP | Sonni Ogbuoji | | |
| Total votes | | | |
| PDP hold | | | |
