= 2003 Nigerian Senate elections in Ebonyi State =

2003 Nigerian Senate election in Ebonyi State

The 2003 Nigerian Senate election in Ebonyi State was held on April 12, 2003, to elect members of the Nigerian Senate to represent Ebonyi State. Christopher Nshi representing Ebonyi North, Julius Ucha representing Ebonyi Central and Emmanuel Azu Agboti representing Ebonyi South all won on the platform of the Peoples Democratic Party.

== Overview ==
Affiliation	Party		Total
Affiliation	PDP	AD	Total
Before Election			3
After Election	3	0	3

== Summary ==
District	Incumbent	Party	Elected Senator	Party
Ebonyi North			Christopher Nshi	PDP
Ebonyi Central			Julius Ucha	PDP
Ebonyi South			Emmanuel Azu Agboti	PDP

== Results ==
=== Ebonyi North ===
The election was won by Christopher Nshi of the Peoples Democratic Party.

2003 Nigerian Senate election in Ebonyi State
Party	Candidate	Votes	%
PDP	Christopher Nshi		
Total votes			
PDP hold			

=== Ebonyi Central ===
The election was won by Julius Ucha of the Peoples Democratic Party.

2003 Nigerian Senate election in Ebonyi State
Party	Candidate	Votes	%
PDP	Julius Ucha		
Total votes			
PDP hold			

=== Ebonyi South ===
The election was won by Emmanuel Azu Agboti of the Peoples Democratic Party.

2003 Nigerian Senate election in Ebonyi State
Party	Candidate	Votes	%
PDP	Emmanuel Azu Agboti		
Total votes			
PDP hold			
