= Flight 250 =

Flight 250 may refer to:

Listed chronologically

- Braniff International Airways Flight 250, crashed on 6 August 1966
- Nigeria Airways Flight 250, crashed on 28 November 1983
