= 2003 Ebonyi State gubernatorial election =

2003 gubernatorial election in Ebonyi State, Nigeria

- (Nigeria)
- April 19, 2003
Nominee	Sam Egwu	Lawrence Nwauruku
Party	PDP	ANPP
Running mate	Emmanuel Isu
Popular vote	768,674
Governor before election
Sam Egwu
PDP
Elected Governor
Sam Egwu
PDP

The 2003 Ebonyi State gubernatorial election occurred on April 19, 2003. PDP's Sam Egwu won election for a first tenure, defeating Incumbent Governor, ANPP's Lawrence Nwauruku and two other candidates.

Sam Egwu emerged winner in the PDP gubernatorial primary election. He retained Emmanuel Isu as his running mate.

== Electoral system ==
The Governor of Ebonyi State is elected using the plurality voting system.

== Results ==
A total of four candidates registered with the Independent National Electoral Commission to contest in the election. PDP candidate Sam Egwu won election for a second term, defeating three other candidates.

The total number of registered voters in the state was 1,002,771. However, only 80.7% (i.e. 809,224) of registered voters participated in the exercise.

Candidate	Party	Votes	%
Sam Egwu	People's Democratic Party (PDP)	768,674	100.00
Lawrence Nwuruku Audu	All Nigeria Peoples Party (ANPP)		
Alliance for Democracy (AD)			
Polycarp Nwite	United Nigeria People's Party (UNPP)		
Total		768,674	100.00
Registered voters/turnout		1,002,771	–
Source: Gamji, Africa Update, Dawodu
