= Mosunmola (name) =

Nigerian given name

- Gender: Female
- Language: Yoruba

Origin
- Origin: Nigerian
- Meaning: I am close to wealth
- Region of origin: South-West Nigeria

Other names
- Short form: Mosun

Mosúnmọ́lá audio is a Nigerian female given name of Yoruba origin which means "I am close to wealth". It can also mean "I have moved close to nobility". Its short form is "Mosun". It originated from Southwest Nigeria.

== Notable people bearing the name ==
- Mo Abudu (Mosunmola Abudu), Nigerian media mogul
- Mosun Filani (Mosunmola Filani), Nigerian actress
