= Champion Breweries =

Nigerian brewing company

Champion Breweries PLC is a Nigerian brewing company located in Akwa Ibom state. The company is the producer of Champion lager beer and Champ Malta.

Champion Breweries was established as a publicly funded commercial enterprise in 1974 and began manufacturing in 1976 with a capacity of 150,000 hecto litres of Champion beer and 10,000 hecto litres of Champ Malta. At formation, the firm patronized a plastic manufacturing company to produce crates for holdings the products instead of paper cartons, a precedent other beer producers later followed.

In 2014, Heineken International acquired a majority equity in the company.

== Products ==
Champion Breweries’ notable brands include: Champion Lager Beer, launched in 1976, it is described as a rich-flavored, golden lager with an exciting aroma.

They introduced new variants in 2023, which includes: Champion Lager Beer with Ginger Extract Champ Malta with Butter Cookies flavor Champ Malta with Tiger Nut.

== See also ==
- Golden Guinea Breweries
- Mopa Breweries
- STAR Lager
