= 2007 Nigerian Senate elections in Osun State =

The 2007 Nigerian Senate election in Osun State was held on 21 April 2007, to elect members of the Nigerian Senate to represent Osun State. Simeon Oduoye representing Osun Central, Isiaka Adetunji Adeleke representing Osun West and Iyiola Omisore representing Osun East all won on the platform of the People's Democratic Party.

== Overview ==
Affiliation	Party		Total
Affiliation	AC	PDP	Total
Before Election			3
After Election	0	3	3

== Summary ==
District	Incumbent	Party	Elected Senator	Party
Osun Central			Simeon Oduoye	PDP
Osun West			Isiaka Adetunji Adeleke	PDP
Osun East			Iyiola Omisore	PDP

== Results ==
=== Osun Central ===
The election was won by Simeon Oduoye of the Peoples Democratic Party (Nigeria).

2007 Nigerian Senate election in Osun State
Party	Candidate	Votes	%
PDP	Simeon Oduoye		
Total votes			
PDP hold			

=== Osun West ===
The election was won by Isiaka Adetunji Adeleke of the Peoples Democratic Party (Nigeria).

2007 Nigerian Senate election in Osun State
Party	Candidate	Votes	%
PDP	Isiaka Adetunji Adeleke		
Total votes			
PDP hold			

=== Osun East ===
The election was won by Iyiola Omisore of the Peoples Democratic Party (Nigeria).

2007 Nigerian Senate election in Osun State
Party	Candidate	Votes	%
PDP	Iyiola Omisore		
Total votes			
PDP hold			
