= Nigerian Institute of Quantity Surveyors =

Professional Quantity Surveying body

The Nigerian Institute of Quantity Surveyors (NIQS)
- Formation: 1969
- Type: Professional association
- Purpose: To encourage professionalism in Quantity Surveying in Nigeria
- Headquarters: No. 24, NIQS Crescent, Off Michael Ama Nnachi Crescent, Cadastral Zone B6, Mabushi District, Abuja, Nigeria.
- Location: Nigeria
- Members: Over 6,000
- Official language: English
- President: QS Dr Aminu Muhammad Bashir, FNIQS.
- Affiliations: CIQS and AIQS
- Website: www.niqs.org.ng

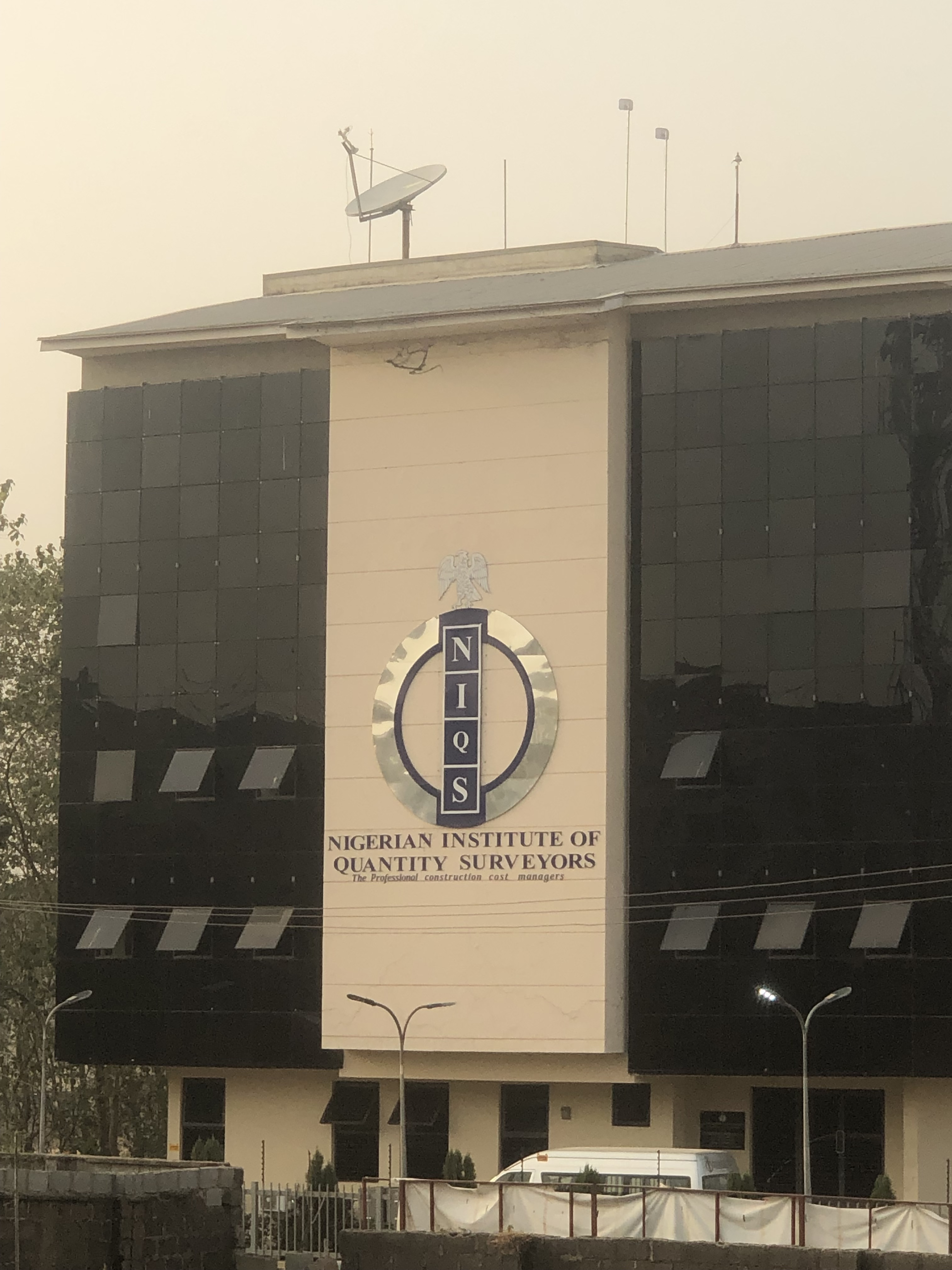
Headquarters in Garki, Abuja

The Nigerian Institute of Quantity Surveyors (NIQS) is the professional umbrella body for quantity surveyors in Nigeria. It is one of the two major bodies associated with the profession in the country. The other is Quantity Surveyors Registration Board of Nigeria (QSRBN), which is the regulatory body of the quantity surveying profession and practice in Nigeria. It was established by Decree No. 31 of December 5, 1986, now CAP Q1 Laws of the Federation of Nigeria (LFN) 2004.

The NIQS has announced the development of a comprehensive cost databank to bolster transparency and accountability in project management for both public and private sectors. Former President Qs. Kene Nzekwe (MNIQS, FNIQS) highlighted this initiative during the August 2024 NIQS national workshop in Abuja, emphasizing that the databank will facilitate effective cost monitoring and regulation, ensuring value for money in construction projects at all governmental levels.

== History ==
The Quantity Surveying profession in Nigeria exist under a body, the Nigeria Institute of Quantity Surveyors, which was founded in 1969. A group of Nigerians, trained in the UK, came back to the country and created a parallel body to the Royal institute of Chartered Surveyors of the United Kingdom.

In the United States of America, quantity surveyors are known as cost engineers. The profession over the years has played some roles in the development of the countries infrastructure by advising government to be accountable. The professional body has as her first president G.A. Balogun, PPNIQS, FNIQS, FRICS (1969-1973), and a first female president, Mercy Torkwase Iyortyer, FNIQS, MAPS (2015- 2017).

== Notable Quantity Surveyors in Nigeria ==
- Mercy Torkwase Iyortyer, FNIQS, MAPS
- Nasir Ahmad el-Rufai
- Mohammed Munir Yakub, Deputy Governor, Katsina State 2015-2023
- Obafemi Onashile
- Michael Ama Nnachi, Nigerian Senator
- Bima Muhammad Enagi, Nigerian Senator

== Chapters ==
- Anambra State Chapter.
- Kaduna State Chapter
- Ondo State Chapter
- Abia State Chapter
- Rivers State Chapter
- Adamawa State Chapter
- Akwa-Ibom State Chapter
- Bauchi State Chapter
- Bayelsa State Chapter
- Benue State Chapter
- Borno State Chapter
- Cross River State Chapter
- Delta State Chapter
- Ebonyi State Chapter
- Edo State Chapter
- Ekiti State Chapter
- Enugu State Chapter
- FCT Chapter
- Gombe State Chapter
- Imo State Chapter
- Jigawa State Chapter
- Kano State Chapter
- Katsina State Chapter
- Kogi State Chapter
- Kwara State Chapter
- Lagos State Chapter
- Nasarawa State Chapter
- Niger State Chapter

== Events ==
The Nigerian Institute of Quantity Surveyors hold workshops across Nigeria annually. Previous events such as workshops, QS Job Fairs, End of The Year Dinner etc were held in Osun State, Gombe, Uyo, March, Kaduna, Makurdy, Abuja, Lagos etc. Other events are Biennial Conference/Election General Meetings and Annual General Meetings.

== Reciprocity agreements ==
During the 65th General Meeting of the Canadian Institute of Quantity Surveyors (CIQS) in 2024, The NIQS and CIQS signed reciprocity agreement, Under the terms of the agreement, a corporate member (fellow or member) of the Nigerian Institute of Quantity Surveyors (NIQS) in good standing may be elected as a Professional Quantity Surveyor (PQS) member of the Canadian Institute of Quantity Surveyors (CIQS) after completing the required portions of the CIQS test of professional experience, which includes sections on bye-laws, rules, regulations, and ethics. Likewise, a Professional Quantity Surveyor (PQS) member of the CIQS in good standing may be elected as a corporate member (fellow or member) of the NIQS. This eligibility requires completing a one-year professional experience as a quantity surveyor in Nigeria, with verification of the professional activities conducted by an NIQS corporate member. The NIQS and CIQS have also committed to exchanging professional research and knowledge and collaborating on topics of shared interest to enhance cooperation on relevant issues.

The NIQS also has reciprocity agreements with the Australian Institute of Quantity Surveyors (AIQS), Engineering Consultants Group (ECG) and the Qatar Green Building Council (QGBC)
