= Tunji Alausa =

Nigerian medical doctor

Mr Tunji Alausa CON

Minister of Education
- Incumbent
- Assumed office 23 October 2024
- President: Bola Tinubu
- Preceded by: Tahir Mamman

Minister of State for Health and Social Welfare
- In office August 21, 2023 – October 23, 2024
- Preceded by: Ekumankama Joseph Nkama
- Succeeded by: Iziaq Adekunle Salako

Personal details
- Born: Morufu Olatunji Alausa; 18 April 1965 (age 61) Epe, Lagos State
- Education: University of Lagos

Tunji Alausa CON (born 18 April 1965) is a Nigerian medical doctor specialising in nephrology and Minister of Education. He previously served as Minister of State for Health and Social Welfare, with both appointments under the administration of President Bola Tinubu.

== Early life and education ==
Alausa was born on 18 April 1965 in Epe, Lagos State. He studied medicine and surgery at the University of Lagos, graduating in 1993.

== Career ==
From 1995 to 1997, Alausa completed a residency in internal medicine at both the Royal Bolton Hospital and the University of Newcastle. Between 1997 and 2001, he was a resident in internal medicine at Cook County Hospital, where he served as Chief Medical Resident. He subsequently became an assistant professor at Rush University Medical School before specialising in nephrology and hypertension at the Medical College of Wisconsin from July 2002 to June 2004.

On 16 August 2023, President Bola Tinubu appointed him Minister of State for Health and Social Welfare. He was sworn in on 21 August 2023. On 23 October 2024, he was redeployed as Minister of Education, replacing Tahir Mamman, one of the five ministers dismissed by the president.
