= Obafemi Onashile =

Nigerian quantity surveyor (born 1964)

Obafemi Oluwole Onashile
- Born: 1964 (age 61–62); Ibadan, Oyo State, Nigeria
- Education: Obafemi Awolowo University, University of Lagos
- Occupations: Quantity surveyor, businessman
- Known for: Founding partner of the Quantity Surveying firm Consol Associates

Obafemi Oluwole Onashile (born August 1964) is a Nigerian quantity surveyor who is the founding partner of the Quantity Surveying firm Consol Associates operating in Nigeria, Ghana and Rwanda. He is also the past President of the Nigerian Institute of Quantity Surveyors (NIQS) and of the African Institute of Quantity Surveyors. He is the President of the Quantity Surveyors Registration Board of Nigeria (QSRBN).

== Early life and education ==
Obafemi was born at Jericho Nursing Home, Ibadan, Oyo State, Nigeria to a family that hails from Ogun State, southwest Nigeria. He grew up in Oke Ado, Ibadan, Oyo State, Nigeria. His father, Folarin Onashile, was a well read lawyer, one of the first of the profession to be trained in the United Kingdom, and he rose to be the chief judge of Ogun State High Court and his mother, Esther Olayide Onashile, was a business woman and building contractor. Obafemi was the seventh child in his family of nine children.

Obafemi had his primary education at Ebenezer Church Primary School, Oke Ado, Ibadan, Oyo State, Nigeria in 1975. In 1980, he completed his secondary education at Federal Government College Odogbolu and he had his bachelor's degree in Quantity Surveying at the University of Ife now Obafemi Awolowo University, Ile Ife in 1986. He then went on to obtain a master's degree in Project Management at the University of Lagos in 2007.

== Career ==
In 1986, Obafemi started his career during his National Youth Service Corps at the Ministry of Works, Housing and Transport, Minna, Niger State, Nigeria. His professional training started at Tillyards & Partners, Kaduna in 1987. He then joined Group Q Associates, Lagos in 1988 there he worked till 1992. In November 2017, Obafemi became the President of Nigerian Institute of Quantity Surveyors (NIQS) until 2019 when he handed over to Mohammed Abba Tor. On 20 October 2020, He was elected and became the 8th President of the African Association of Quantity Surveyors (AAQS) the umbrella body of all the institutions of Quantity Surveyors in Africa

Obafemi started Consol Associates as a Principal Partner after leaving Group Q Associates in Lagos. He leads the management of the Lagos office.
