= 2011 Ebonyi State gubernatorial election =

State election in Nigeria

- 26 April 2011
| Nominee | Martin Elechi | Julius Ucha |
| Party | PDP | ANPP |
| Popular vote | 287,217 | 125,248 |
Governor before election
Martin Elechi
PDP
Elected Governor
Martin Elechi
PDP

The 2011 Ebonyi State gubernatorial election was the 5th gubernatorial election of Ebonyi State. Held on 26 April 2011, the People's Democratic Party nominee Martin Elechi won the election, defeating Julius Ucha of the All Nigeria Peoples Party.

== Results ==
A total of 9 candidates contested in the election. Martin Elechi from the People's Democratic Party won the election, defeating Julius Ucha from the All Nigeria Peoples Party. Valid votes was 451,459.

2011 Ebonyi State gubernatorial election
| Party | Candidate | Votes | % | ±% |
|---|---|---|---|---|
| PDP | Martin Elechi | 287,217 | | |
| ANPP | Julius Ucha | 125,248 | | |
| PDP hold | | | | |
