= Kayode Oduoye =

Nigerian politician, lawyer, and businessman

Kayode Emmanuel Oduoye, often referred to as ‘Superkay’, is a Nigerian politician, lawyer, businessman and philanthropist. He is a member of the People's Democratic Party and was the party's candidate for House of Representatives in 2015.

== Early life ==
Oduoye was born (October 6, 1970) in Ibadan to the family of Late Senator & Chief (Mrs) Simeon Olasunkanmi Oduoye of Ikirun in Ifelodun Local Government Area of Osun State. The Senior Oduoye was military governor of Niger and Ebonyi States between 1996 and 1999. He retired as an Assistant Inspector General in the Nigerian Police in 1999. He also represented Osun Central Senatorially District in the Nigerian Senate from 2003 to 2007. Kayode Oduoye attended INRI Experimental Nursery and Primary School, Onireke, Ibadan; St.Richard's Catholic Primary School, Jericho, Ibadan, and the famous Government College, Ibadan (GCI) where he sat for his West African School Certificate Examination in 1988.

== Career ==
Oduoye gained admission to study Law at the Obafemi Awolowo University, Ile-Ife, in 1989; however, because of the unrest in the institution that year, he, like many "Jambites" of that time, did not resume academic work until 1990. From OAU, he received a Second Class Upper grade in Law in 1995 and also finished as the best foreign student in the Master of Law class at the University of Buckingham, United Kingdom, in 1998. He majored in International Trade and Commercial Law. Upon his return to Nigeria from his overseas studies, Oduoye set up ShalomKay Group. The company is involved in telecommunication, energy, oil and gas.

== Politics ==
Oduoye's foray into politics began in 2001, but because of the circumstance of his father's involvement in the politics as well, Kayode did not seek any political position at that time. However, he was actively involved in the youth mobilization activities for his father's successful senate bid in 2003. Nevertheless, in 2015 he contested for a seat in the House of Representatives to represent the constituents of Ifelodun/Odo-Otin/Boripe Federal Constituency of Osun State. Based on the feelers from his party agents which indicated the election was skewed to favour his opponent, Oduoye was persuaded by his numerous supporters to challenge the results of the election at the Election Tribunal. On 16 December 2015, the Court of Appeal in Akure upheld the decision of the trial Tribunal led by Justice A.G. Kwajaffa and finally resolved the case against him.

== Personal life ==
Oduoye is married to the popular Nollywood actress Mosunmola Filani-Oduoye. The marriage was solemnized at Graceville Chapel, Ikeja, on 29 April 2012 following a traditional wedding that took place 19 February 2012 in Ibadan. It is believed that his father, who died 21 March 2014, left a large sum of money to him, and critics cite that as the source of his philanthropic contributions.
