= Amanchor Cave =

Cave in Ebonyi State, Nigeria

Coordinates: 5°51′55″N 7°48′25″E

Amanchor Cave is located in the Etiti community of Edda, Afikpo South, in Ebonyi State of Nigeria. The cave is 4 km/2.5 miles in length.

== History ==
According to Chief Boniface Agwuibe, the community head, said the cave was discovered by a hunter, Ofia Ugo (or Uko), who named it Ogba Amanchor.

== Passageways ==
The Amanchor cave has a natural step-like entrance that is supported by a wooden ladder built by the community. The cave's entrance is 6 metres (20 feet) high.

The cave features three tunnels, the second of which is known as the "window," leading to the cave's ground level. The cave floor may be seen from the "window."

The cave's third entry is known as the "door." On the last Orie (one of the four market days in the Igbo cultural calendar) of the year, in December, an annual event known as Orie-Ogba is traditionally held in the cave.

== Habitat ==
The cave is home to several species of bats, most likely those of insectivore and fruit-eating species. They exit the cave during twilight and reenter late in the night. There is a belief among local people that the bats protect the cave and will bite intruders with evil intentions.

The cave served as a refuge for local people during the Nigeria/Biafra war.

== Claims of mystical powers ==
Some people claim that the cave serves as a place for spiritual healing or good luck charm to its visitors provided they are led in by the village head before making a wish at a particular spot in the cave.

O. Emeafor and C. Odum of the University of Nigeria, Nsukka have written that the hamlet of Amanchor has rich cultural practices including the secret cult of Egbela, a rite of passage for boys into manhood. The cult has symbolic value for the Edda people, and is reputed to have an influence on their social, political and religious lives. Members of the cult must strictly adhere to moral purity and reverence to benefit from the cult's protective capacity.
