= 1999 Ebonyi State gubernatorial election =

1999 gubernatorial election in Ebonyi State, Nigeria

- January 9, 1999
Nominee	Sam Egwu
Party	PDP	All People's Party (Nigeria)
Popular vote	272,559	213,106
Elected Governor
Sam Egwu
PDP

The 1999 Ebonyi State gubernatorial election occurred in Nigeria on January 9, 1999. The PDP nominee Sam Egwu won the election, defeating the APP candidate.

Sam Egwu emerged PDP candidate.

== Electoral system ==
The Governor of Ebonyi State is elected using the plurality voting system.

== Primary election ==
=== PDP primary ===
The PDP primary election was won by Sam Egwu.

== Results ==
The total number of registered voters in the state was 902,327. Total number of votes cast was 517,893, while number of valid votes was 505,862. Rejected votes were 12,031.

Candidate	Party	Votes	%
Sam Egwu	People's Democratic Party	272,559	56.12
All People's Party	213,106	43.88	
Total		485,665	100.00
Valid votes		485,665	97.58
Invalid/blank votes		12,031	2.42
Total votes		497,696	100.00
Registered voters/turnout		902,327	55.16
Source: Nigeria World, IFES, Semantics Scholar
