= Samuel Olaiya Oni =

Nigerian academic and politician (1941–2015)

Minister of Education
- In office August 1998 – June 1999
- President: Abdulsalami Abubakar

Personal details
- Born: 1941
- Died: 2015 (aged 73–74) Akure, the Ondo state

Samuel Olaiya Oni (1941–2015) was a Nigerian academic and politician who was the Minister of Education from August 1998 to June 1999 during the regime of General Abdulsalami Abubakar.

== Career ==
He formerly served as the Secretary to the State Government of Ondo State, and a pioneer Chairman of the Labour Party.

== Death ==
Oni died in 2015 in Akure, Ondo State.

== See also ==
- List of education ministers of Nigeria
