= Nigeria Airways Flight 250 =

November 1983 plane crash in Enugu, Nigeria

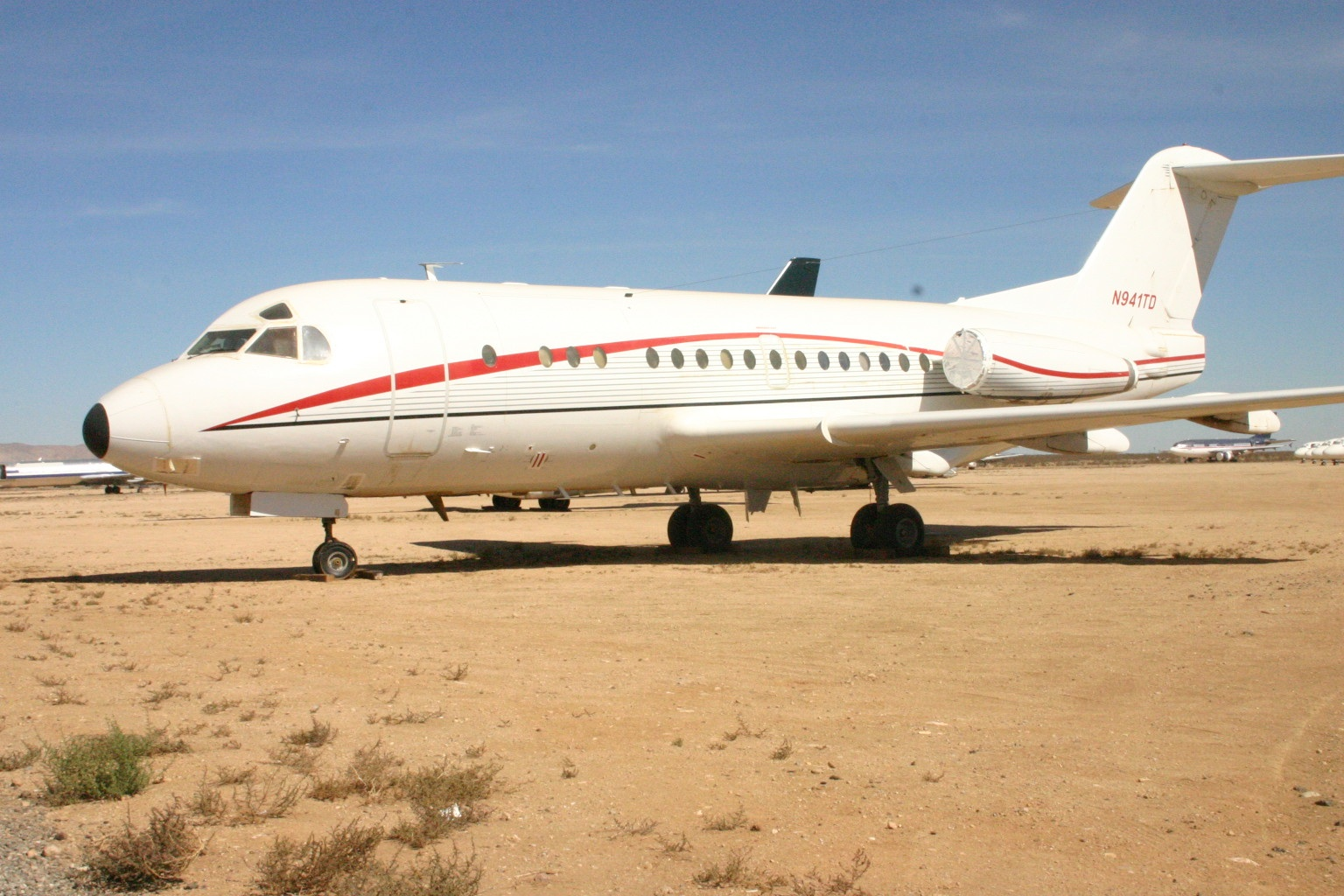
- A Fokker F28 Fellowship similar to the accident aircraft

Accident
- Date: November 28, 1983
- Summary: Controlled flight into terrain due to pilot error in poor weather
- Site: 3.3 km from Akanu Ibiam International Airport, Enugu, Enugu State, Nigeria 6°28′26″N 7°33′40″E

Aircraft
- Aircraft type: Fokker F28 Fellowship 2000
- Operator: Nigeria Airways
- IATA flight No.: WT250
- ICAO flight No.: NGA250
- Call sign: NIGERIAN 250
- Registration: 5N-ANF
- Flight origin: Murtala Muhammed International Airport, Ikeja, Lagos State, Nigeria
- Destination: Akanu Ibiam International Airport, Enugu, Enugu State, Nigeria
- Occupants: 72
- Passengers: 66
- Crew: 6
- Fatalities: 53
- Survivors: 19

Nigeria Airways Flight 250 was a domestic Nigerian flight from Ikeja to Enugu that crashed at 11:13 a.m. on the morning of November 28, 1983. On approach to Akanu Ibiam International Airport in Enugu, the Fokker F28 Fellowship 2000 crashed into a cassava field 3.3 km from the runway. 53 of the 72 people on board the plane were killed, making the crash the fourth-deadliest aviation accident in Nigeria at the time.

== Background ==
=== Aircraft ===
The aircraft involved in the crash was a Fokker F28 Fellowship 2000, registered as 5N-ANF. Its first flight was on February 10, 1975, making it 8 years and 10 months old at the time of the accidents. The plane had 10,618 flight hours and 14,149 flight cycles.

== Accident ==
The pilots decided upon a VOR approach to Enugu. The visibility was very poor and below minima required for this approach. The minimum descent altitude of 300 ft was maintained above the local terrain, however, for unknown reasons, the plane began to descend about 3 km from the runway's threshold. The plane impacted the terrain of a cassava field.

The landing gear was torn off the aircraft and the plane slid on its belly for a few hundred feet. The left wing and engine were torn off by trees. The aft pressure bulkhead, aft fuselage, and empennage separated from the aircraft. The front fuselage was severely compressed and the cargo holds were ruptured. A fire erupted at the separated wing and engulfed the remains of the fuselage.

== Victims and survivors ==
53 people died in the crash. 15 were killed in the initial impact and 38 were killed in the ensuing fire. Of the 19 survivors, 9 had serious injuries, and 10 had minor injuries or were uninjured.

The surviving flight crew and forward flight attendant escaped the wreckage via the cockpit's emergency windows. Some passengers also escaped through the cockpit.

Four of the victims were children of Nigerian senator Offia Nwali. The daughter of the then state governor of Anambra State, C.C. Onoh, was also a victim of the crash. Doctor Josephine Onoh, who was returning from the United States to visit her family died together with her cousin, Doctor Keneth Oji in the crash.

== Probable cause ==
The probable cause was "the decision of the flight crew to continue the approach in below-minima weather conditions until the aircraft impacted the ground."

== See also ==
- List of accidents and incidents involving commercial aircraft
