= Offia Nwali =

Nigerian politician

Senator
- In office 1979–1983
- Constituency: Abakaliki Senatorial District

Personal details
- Died: May 24, 2016 (age 74)
- Occupation: Politician

Offia Nwali was a Nigerian politician who served as a Second Republic senator representing the Abakaliki Senatorial District in the National Assembly from 1979 to 1983. He died on May 24, 2016, at the age of 74.

== Personal life ==
In 1983, Nwali lost his wife and four children in the Nigerian Airways plane crash in Enugu, which claimed the lives of around 53 passengers.

== See also ==
- Nigeria Airways Flight 250
- List of members of the House of Representatives of Nigeria, 1999–2003
