= Walter Feghabo =

Nigerian politician (1956–2025)

Military Administrator of Ebonyi State
- In office 7 October 1996 – August 1998
- Succeeded by: Simeon Oduoye

Military Administrator of Delta State
- In office 12 August 1998 – 29 May 1999
- Preceded by: John Dungs
- Succeeded by: James Ibori

Walter Feghabo (15 August 1956 – 19 October 2025) was a Nigerian military officer born in Warri, Delta State, Nigeria. He was raised in Warri and attended primary and secondary schools in the city. Navy Commander (retired). Walter Feghabo served as the first Military Administrator of Ebonyi State in Nigeria between October 1996 and August 1998 after Ebonyi State was created from parts of Enugu State and Abia State during the military regime of General Sani Abacha. He was then appointed administrator of Delta State in August 1998 during the transitional regime of General Abdulsalami Abubakar, handing over to the elected civilian governor James Ibori on 29 May 1999. In June 1999, all former military administrators in the Abacha and Abubakar regimes were retired by the Federal Government, including Walter Feghabo.

Feghabo died on 19 October 2025, aged 68.

== See also ==
- List of governors of Delta State
