= Adamu Adamu =

Nigerian politician, accountant and journalist (born 1954)

Mallam Adamu Adamu CON
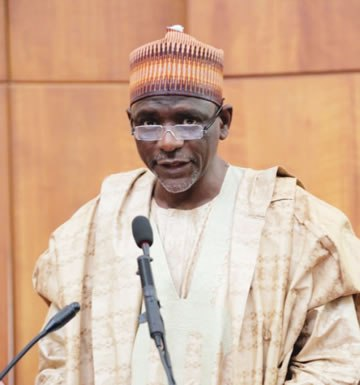

Minister of Education
- In office 11 November 2015 – 29 May 2023
- President: Muhammadu Buhari
- Preceded by: Ibrahim Shekarau
- Succeeded by: Tahir Mamman

Personal details
- Born: 25 May 1954 (age 72) Azare, Northern Region, British Nigeria (now Azare, Katagum, Bauchi State, Nigeria)
- Party: All Progressives Congress
- Education: Ahmadu Bello University; Columbia University
- Occupation: Politician; accountant; journalist

Mallam Adamu Adamu CON (born 25 May 1954) is a Nigerian accountant, journalist and politician who served as the minister of Education from 2015 to 2023.

== Early life and education ==
Adamu was born on 25 May 1954, in Azare. He received a bachelor's degree in accounting from Ahmadu Bello University in Zaria. He later received a master's degree in journalism from Columbia University's School of Journalism. He is a polyglot and speaks Hausa, English, Persian, Arabic and French. He is from Bauchi State, Nigeria.

== Career ==
After graduating, Adamu worked briefly as an accountant in Bauchi State before later venturing into journalism. He began his journalistic career as a public analyst and writer on a variety of themes and subjects. In 1984, he got his first job with the New Nigerian newspapers as a special correspondent and member of the editorial board of the New Nigerian group. He rose to become deputy editor of the New Nigerian newspaper and chairman of the group editorial board. Adamu was also a back-page columnist [Friday Column] for Media Trust's titles and has contributed to many news outlets, including Canada-based Crescent International. Adamu also served as a special assistant to General Muhammadu Buhari, then chairman of the Petroleum Trust Fund, PTF. Before he was appointed minister in 2015, he was the secretary and a member of Muhammadu Buhari's APC Presidential Transition Committee.

== Minister of Education ==
Adamu was first appointed Minister of Education by President Muhammadu Buhari on 11 November 2015, along with 35 others, when the president made his first major appointments. He was reappointed on 21 August 2019 after President Buhari was re-elected for a second term.

== Award ==
In October 2022, a Nigerian national honour of Commander of the Order of the Niger (CON) was conferred on him by President Muhammadu Buhari.

== See also ==
- Cabinets of Nigeria
