= Simeon Oduoye =

Nigerian politician (1945–2014)

Senator for Osun Central
- In office 5 June 2007 – 6 June 2011
- Preceded by: Felix Kola Ogunwale
- Succeeded by: Olusola Adeyeye

Administrator of Ebonyi State
- In office August 1998 – 29 May 1999
- Preceded by: Walter Feghabo
- Succeeded by: Sam Egwu

Administrator of Niger State
- In office 22 August 1996 – August 1998
- Preceded by: Cletus Komena Emein
- Succeeded by: Habibu Idris Shuaibu

Personal details
- Born: Simeon Olasukanmi Oduoye; 13 April 1945 Ikirun, Southern Region, British Nigeria (now in Osun State, Nigeria)
- Died: 21 March 2014 (aged 68)
- Party: Peoples Democratic Party (PDP)
- Spouse: Chief (Mrs) Samiat Titilayo Oduoye
- Children: 6, including Kayode
- Occupation: Politician; administrator

Simeon Olasukanmi Oduoye (13 April 1945 – 21 March 2014) was a Nigerian police officer and administrator of Niger and Ebonyi States. He was elected senator for Osun Central in April 2007 on the Peoples Democratic Party (PDP) platform.

== Background ==
Simeon Oduoye was born on 13 April 1945. He obtained the West African School Certificate in 1964 from Akinorum Grammar School, Ikirun. He enlisted in the Nigeria Police on 1 July 1965. He became an Assistant Inspector General of Police, retiring in 1999. He was Administrator of Niger and Ebonyi States 1996–1999. He was chairman of NSPRI (2005–2007). He is Chairman and Managing Director of Layo Woodmill Nigeria Ltd.

As administrator of Ebonyi State, one of his first acts was to set up a committee to restructure the state civil service to ensure order, seniority, observance to rules and regulations. In an October 2009 interview, Senator Julius Agbo cited Oduoye's administration as an example of a very well organised person who tried to establish civil service in Ebonyi state.

== Senate career ==
Simeon Oduoye was elected senator for Osun Central in April 2007 on the (PDP) platform. He was appointed to committees on Security & Intelligence, Power, Land Transport, Interior Affairs, Drugs Narcotics Anti Corruption and Air Force.

In May 2008, as Vice chairman of the Senate Committee on Security and National Intelligence, Oduoye said the Senate was about to approve the establishment of a special court for financial crimes.

== Personal life ==
He was married to Chief (Mrs) Samiat Titilayo Oduoye.

He is the father to Abidemi Oduoye, Kayode Oduoye, Olanike Oduoye, Olajumoke Oduoye, Olaoluwa Oduoye and Babatunde Oduoye.
