= Abraham Imogie =

Nigerian scholar

Professor Abraham Inanoya Imogie, of Afemai (Edo State) origin, is a distinguished Nigerian scholar and holds the title of Professor Emeritus. He was a former secretary for Education in the short lived interim administration of Ernest Shonekan. During his tenure, he tried to reduce the depth of federal control of schools and the lifting of foreign sanctions on Nigeria in order to ensure effective cooperation between Nigeria and foreign educational institutions.

== Early life and education ==
Abraham Inanoya Imogie hails from Afemai in Edo State, Nigeria. He earned his Ph.D. in Education from Michigan State University in 1980, with a dissertation titled Instructional Media Use by Faculty Members in Ahmadu Bello University, Zaria: A Study of Factors Related to Educational Innovations in a Nigerian University Context.

== Academic career ==
Professor Imogie has held various academic positions, including serving as Deputy Vice Chancellor at the University of Benin. He has authored several influential works on educational technology and instructional media, notably co-writing Fundamentals of Educational Technology in 1988.

== Government service ==
In 1993, during Nigeria's brief Interim National Government under Chief Ernest Shonekan, Professor Imogie was appointed Secretary for Education. In this role, he advocated for reducing federal control over schools and lobbied for the lifting of international sanctions to facilitate better cooperation between Nigeria and foreign educational institutions. His appointment was part of a cabinet announced on August 28, 1993, as reported by NTA TV Lagos.

== Contributions to educational policy ==
Professor Imogie's work has been instrumental in shaping educational policy in Nigeria. His research and publications have focused on the adoption of instructional media and the role of institutional leadership in educational innovation.

== Legacy and recognition ==
A respected figure in Nigerian academia, Professor Imogie celebrated his 80th birthday in 2025, marking decades of dedication to education and policy development. His contributions continue to influence educational practices and policies in Nigeria.
