= Alex Ozone =

Nigerian talent manager and show promoter

- Born: Nwuruku Ozor Alex
- Occupations: Event promoter; Talent manager
- Years active: 2000–present
- Organization: 03Media

Nwuruku Ozor Alex professionally known as Alex Ozone is a Nigerian talent manager and show promoter.

== Life and career ==
Ozone grew up in Ojuelegba, Lagos. In 2000, he founded 03Media which promoted A.Y. which was followed by Terry G's Free Madness. Alex Ozone's Homecoming Development, a platform for collaboration for youths in Ebonyi State was met with critical reception.
