= Tahir Mamman =

Nigerian lawyer and academic (born 1954)

Tahir Mamman SAN OON
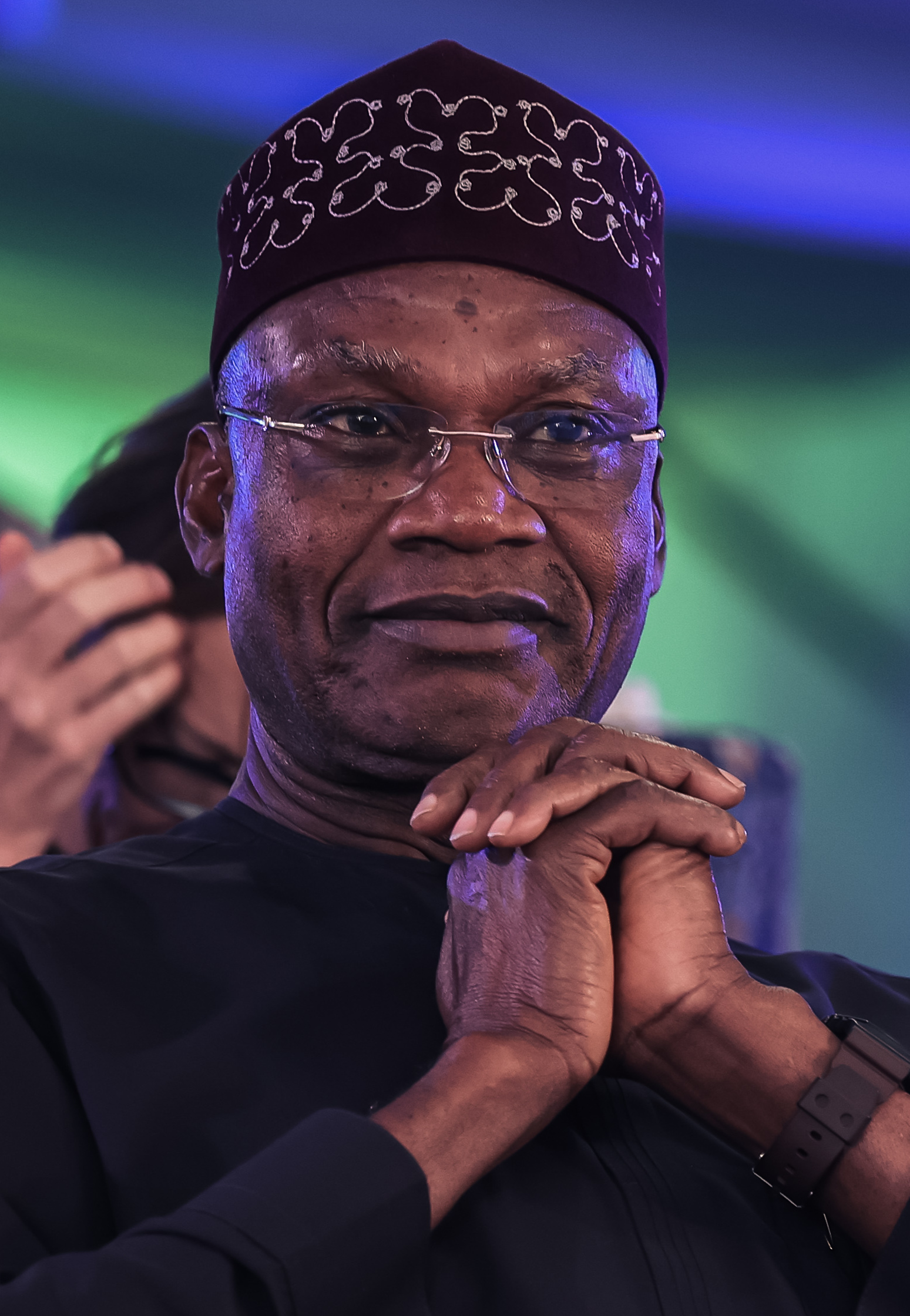

Minister of Education
- In office 21 August 2023 – 23 October 2024
- President: Bola Tinubu
- Minister of State: Yusuf Sununu
- Preceded by: Adamu Adamu
- Succeeded by: Morufu Olatunji Alausa

Director General of the Nigerian Law School
- In office 2005–2013
- Succeeded by: Olanrewaju Onadeko

Personal details
- Born: 7 July 1954 (age 71)
- Party: All Progressives Congress (2014–present)
- Education: Ahmadu Bello University (LL.B.); Nigerian Law School; University of Warwick (LL.M.)
- Occupation: Lawyer; academic; politician

Tahir Mamman SAN OON (born 7 July 1954) is a Nigerian lawyer, professor and academic who is a former minister of education of Nigeria. He was the director-general of the Nigerian Law School from 2005 to 2013. He was a one time vice chancellor of Baze University, Abuja and member governing board of the Niger Delta Development Commission (NDDC).

He was appointed minister of Education by President Bola Tinubu on 16 August 2023 and was relieved of the position in 2024 .

He is a recognized member of the Body of Benchers. In 2010, he became a board member of the International Association of Law Schools based in Washington DC. In September 2015, he was conferred Senior Advocate of Nigeria (SAN). In recognition of his efforts, the Federal Government of Nigeria bestowed him with the national honour of Officer of the Order of the Niger (OON).

Mamman joined party politics in 2014 after completing his tenure as director general of the Nigerian Law School. He ran for Adamawa State governorship election on the platform of the APC in December 2014 along with three other aspirant. In June 2020, the All Progressives Congress national executive committee appointed and inaugurated him as a Member representing the northeast geopolitical zone/acting national vice chairman north east in the National Caretaker/Extraordinary Convention Planning Committee CECPC of the All Progressives Congress. He holds the chieftains titles of Dan Ruwata Adamawa Emirate and Dokajin Mubi of Adamawa State.

== Early life and education ==
Mamman was born in 1954 at Michika in Adamawa State. He holds a LL.B degree at the Ahmadu Bello University in 1983 and call to the bar in the Nigerian Law School in 1984. He earned his master's from the University of Warwick England in 1987 and his PhD in 1990 University of Warwick, Warwickshire England.

== Career ==
He began lecturing at the University of Maiduguri in the Faculty of Law and rose to become the Dean in the Faculty of Law. Mamman had served as judiciary in Adamawa State from 1974 to 1984, head of department common law in 1991 at the University of Maiduguri to 1997 and member of National Universities Commission, member of Local Government Election Tribunal, Adamawa State in 1997, he was the students affairs dean in the University of Maiduguri from 1997 to 2000 and was adviser part time consultant in the State House of Assembly of Adamawa, Yobe and Borno State from 1999 to 2000. He was also steering member committee of the establishment of Adamawa State University, external examiner at the Ahmadu Bello University from 2001 to 2002 and patron for Youth Federation of Nigeria and Nigeria Youth Organization of University of Maiduguri. He became the deputy director of Nigeria Law School Kano campus from 2001 to 2005 prior to become the Director General.

He is a member of the Body of benchers, Council of legal education, Nigerian Bar Association, Nigerian Association Of Law Teacher, Commonwealth Legal Education Association, Centre for Computer Assisted Legal Instruction USA, national association of vice chancellors of Nigeria, United Kingdom Centre for Legal Education, African Network of Constitutional Lawyers, International Bar Association, Body of senior advocates of Nigeria (BOSAN) and member Governing Board of International Association of Law School Washington DC from 2011 to 2013.

== Publication ==
- The law and politics of constitution-making in Nigeria, 1862–1989 issues, interests and compromises. Maiduguri, ed; Ed-Linform Services, Tahir Mamman, con; Heaney N, Mamman M, Tahir H, Al-Gharib A. Lin C. 1998 Nigeria Constitutional law, ISBN 978314961X, 9789783149618, OCLC 1124151500 Unique ID: 7493122309
- The law and politics of constitution making in Nigeria, 1900–1989 issues, interests and compromises. 1991, Ph.D, University of Warwick, Law Politics and political science. Tahir Mamman, Academic theses, OCLC 53541742
