= Jennifer Ephraim =

Nigerian actress

Jennifer Chisom Ephraim
- Born: Jennifer Chisom Ephraim; 23 August 2001 (age 25)
- Citizenship: Nigeria
- Education: Adonai University
- Occupation: Actress
- Years active: 2013–present

Jennifer Chisom Ephraim (born 23 August 2001) is a Nigerian actress. She has acted in several films, including Love and Desperation, Second Wives, Odogwu Finds a Wife and The Waiter.

== Early life and education ==
Ephraim was born in Ebonyi State, Nigeria and was raised in Lagos. She is of Igbo ethnicity of Anambra State. Ephraim is a graduate of international relations and french from the Adonai University, and later trained in acting at the High Definition Film Academy in Abuja.

== Career ==
Ephraim began her acting career since childhood days by acting in her church drama group and other informal stage performances. She made her professional acting debut at the age of 12.

Ephraim has acted in several films, including Love and Desperation, Second Wives, Odogwu Finds a Wife and The Waiter. She is the author of the book "Dilemma Of The Nigeria Girl Child" and the winner of the 2018 Face of Democracy Nigeria South-East. Ephraim is the brand ambassador of Glow by Nessa.

== Philanthropy ==
Ephraim is the founder of the Jennifer Ephraim Foundation which aims to empower women and children. She helps the less privileged and promotes education and empowerment through her foundation. In 2022, her foundation awarded scholarships to students of Government Day Secondary School, Wuse 2 Abuja and in 2023, the foundation renovated the LEA Primary School classrooms in Jikwoyi Phase 1 Abuja.

The Jennifer Ephraim Foundation won Equality and Advocate Foundation of the Year at the Nigeria Humanitarian Award and Magazine 2023 and also NGO of the Year at the Regal Award 2023.

== Selected filmography ==
- Love and Desperation
- Second Wives
- Odogwu Finds a Wife
- The Waiter
- Love in a Fix
- Walking Her Miles
- By My Side
- Finding a Perfect Wife for Dad
- The Good Husband
- Flames of Love
