= Igwe Aja-Nwachukwu =

Former education minister of Nigeria

Igwe Aja-Nwachuku

Federal Minister of Education
- In office 26 July 2007 – 17 December 2008
- Preceded by: Obiageli Ezekwesili
- Succeeded by: Sam Egwu

Personal details
- Born: March 31, 1952
- Died: November 17, 2015 (aged 63)

Igwe Aja-Nwachukwu (March 31, 1952 – November 17, 2015) was a Nigerian politician. He ended his term as education minister of Nigeria on 17 December 2008. He had been appointed education minister eighteen months earlier. He was replaced as education minister by Dr. Sam Egwu. Dr. Aja-Nwachukwu graduated from the University of Ibadan with a B.Sc in statistics, held an MBA Finance, an M.Sc Statistics and a Ph.D in Economics. He also has a postgraduate diploma in computer science and engineering.

He began his public service career as Education Officer with the Ebonyi State Ministry of Education in 1979 as a mathematics teacher. Between 1984 and 2006, he taught finance and business as a Lecturer in Abia State University and Ebonyi State University, Abakaliki. Dr. Aja-Nwachukwu also ran for the office of Governor of Ebonyi state of Nigeria in the 2007 elections. He was a son of Aja Nwachukwu, Nigeria's first Minister of Education.

== See also ==
- List of people from Ebonyi State
