= Mosun Filani =

Nigerian actress

- Born: Mosunmola Filani; Ibadan, Oyo State, Nigeria
- Education: Business Administration, Tai Solarin University of Education
- Occupation: Actress
- Years active: 2005–present
- Spouse: Kayode Oduoye
- Children: 2

Mosunmola Filani is a Nigerian actress.

== Early life and education ==
Mosun was born in Ibadan to parents from Ikole Ekiti. She was raised with four other siblings. She attended Abeokuta College of Education and earned a degree in Business Administration from Tai Solarin University of Education.

== Acting career ==
Mosun has starred in several Nollywood movies, especially Yoruba films and radio productions since 2005. She has also received several nominations including Best Actress in a supporting role in the 2009 and 2011 Best of Nollywood Awards.

== Personal life ==
Mosun's father died in 2015. She is married to a lawyer-politician: Kayode Oduoye with two children.

== Selected filmography ==
- Iku Ewa
- Ami Ayo
- Different Strokes (2023) as Dunni
- Imelda (2022) as Bisola
- Iyo Aye (2011)
- Oga Olopa (2010)
- Ise Onise (2009)
- Ise Imole (2009) as Sunmade
- Jenifa (2009) as Tracy
- Aje metta (2008) as Hadiza

== See also ==
- List of Yoruba people
