= Ruqayyah Ahmed Rufa'i =

Nigerian politician (born 1958)

Ruqayyahtu Ahmed Rufa'i

Minister of Education
- In office 6 April 2010 – 11 September 2013
- Preceded by: Sam Egwu
- Succeeded by: Nyesom Wike

Personal details
- Born: c. 1958 Ringim, Jigawa State, Nigeria

Ruqayyahtu Ahmed Rufa'i (born c. 1958) was appointed as Nigerian Minister of Education on 6 April 2010, when Acting President Goodluck Jonathan announced his new cabinet.

== Early life and education ==
Rufa'i was born in Ringim, in Jigawa State. She obtained a B.Ed in history from Bayero University, Kano, in 1981, an MA in History from the same university in 1987 and PhD in Education from West Virginia University, US, in 1991. She served as Commissioner for Health under the military regime of General Sani Abacha between 1993 and 1996.

She was promoted professor in 2003, and served as Commissioner for Education, Science and Technology in Jigawa State. She said that she was always ashamed when faced with the challenge of low enrollment of the girls in Jigawa State, and found it difficult to explain why the state could not enroll more girls in schools. She banned the use of mobile phones in secondary schools due to their distracting influence.

== Leaving ministerial office ==
Amidst political problems in the ruling Peoples Democratic Party (PDP), where seven governors, including Sule Lamido of Jigawa State, and dozens of senators and members of House of Representatives split to New PDP, President Goodluck Ebele Jonathan relieved nine ministers of their positions, including Ruqayyat, in 2013.

== Bibliography ==
- Ruqayyah Ahmed Rufa'i (1995). Gidan Rumfa: The Kano palace. Triumph Publishing. ISBN 978-188-036-8.
