= Onyekachi Nwaebonyi =

Nigerian politician

Onyekachi Nwaebonyi (born Nwebonyi Onyeka Peter) is a Nigerian politician who has served as senator representing Ebonyi North central senatorial district since 2023. A member of All Progressives Congress, he holds the position of Deputy Chief Whip in the Senate.

== Legal issue ==
In a letter dated 27 March 2025, the spouse of Natasha Akpoti, Emmanuel Udughan, demanded public apology from Nwebonyi following his statements that alleges both married under duress.
