= Anthony Agbo =

Nigerian politician

Anthony O. Agbo

Senator for Ebonyi North
- Incumbent
- Assumed office 29 May 2007
- Preceded by: Christopher Nshi

Personal details
- Born: Ebonyi State, Nigeria

Anthony O. Agbo was elected Senator for the Ebonyi North constituency of Ebonyi State, Nigeria, taking office on 29 May 2007. He is a member of the People's Democratic Party (PDP).

Agbo was educated at Ebonyi State University and the University of Nigeria, Nsukka, graduating in 1988. He was elected to the Enugu State House Of Assembly (before Ebonyi state was formed from part of Enugu), and was appointed Speaker. Later he was Commissioner of Finance (1999–2003) and Commissioner of Public Utilities (2003–2005) for Ebonyi State. Outside his political career, Agbo is a poet who has published his work in several journals and is a sponsor of Nigerian literature.

After taking his seat in the Senate in May 2007 Agbo was appointed to committees on National Identity Card & Population, Housing, Federal Capital Territory and Drugs Narcotics Anti Corruption. In April 2008 he was appointed vice-chairman of a committee investigating Mallam Nasir el-Rufai's administration of the FCT. In a mid-term evaluation of Senators in May 2009, This Day noted that he had sponsored bills on the Nigerian Congressional Medal of Honour Award, the National Cooperative Society Federation and the Nigerian Unified Filed Institute, and had sponsored or co-sponsored many motions. He was active in plenary and committee work.

Agbo has canvassed for establishment of a Ministry for disabled people. In an interview in March 2009, speaking of Nigeria in general and Abuja FCT in particular, he said that the program to rebrand Nigeria would not work until the place was indeed an attractive place to visit, with good infrastructure, a clean environment and security.

== See also ==
- List of people from Ebonyi State
