= Edda (local government area) =

Edda local government area Eddha Afikpo South
- LGA
- Location in Nigeria
- Coordinates: 5°58′N 7°52′E
- Country: Nigeria
- State: Ebonyi State
- Headquarters: Nguzu Edda
- HASC: NG.EB.AS

Government
  - Type: Local Government
  - Chairman: Chima Ekumankama

Area
  - Total: 378 km^{2} (146 sq mi)

Population (2023)
  - Total: 450,072
  - Density: 1,190/km^{2} (3,080/sq mi)
- Time zone: UTC+1 (WAT)
- Postcode: 490

Edda is a local government area in Ebonyi State, Nigeria. It was formerly known as Afikpo South, until the renaming was confirmed by President Muhammadu Buhari on 17 March 2023.

== History ==
Most of the autonomous communities of Edda existed as small city states, with each having its own monarch. These communities, made up of about 72 villages today, functioned as a confederation until 1867, when the British colonialists incorporated Edda into the Southern Protectorate, which later became the Southern Nigeria Protectorate. The defunct city states still have monarchs that have no administrative functions, but serve as social and cultural representatives.

Edda was previously known as Akipfo South, a name which was assigned when it was separated from the Afikpo Local Government Area in 1991 by the Federal Republic of Nigeria.

Successive legislators from the area fought to change the name to Edda, to better reflect the areas heritage and identity.

== Geography ==
Edda is bordered by Unwana to the east, Akaeze to the west, Amasiri to the north, Afikpo to the north-east, Ohafia to the south, Nkporo to the south west, and Erei to the south-east. It has an area of 378 km^{2} (146 sq mi) and had population of 157,072 at the 2006 census.

Edda is composed of autonomous communities and towns which include: Etiti Edda, Ebunwana Edda, Ekoli Edda, Owutu Edda, Amangwu Edda, Oso Edda, and Amato Edda. The administrative headquarters of the local government area is Nguzu Edda.

The names of towns and villages within Edda often have "Edda" as their endings as an addendum designating their membership of the Edda cultural commonwealth.

== Education ==
Education was held a quasi-religious status in Edda in its ancient history. Every district of each town and village in Edda still bears relics of a past where social life was built around mead halls that were centers of education, religion and recreation. Customarily, Edda boys were inducted into the mead hall from a young age. They were taught swordsmanship, warfare, craftmanship and the norms of their clan. They would go on a peregrination in the woods for months where they learned survival, sometimes with an older relative who had already passed the training. Remains of mead halls are still found all over Edda.

The ancient martial culture of the Edda ensured that Edda remained unassailable by slavers. The people defended their lands and protected territories they considered their sphere of influence, stretching into modern day Cross River and Akwa Ibom and extending to the sea. Unfortunately, the traditional mode of education that focused on building skills to defend their lands didn't survive into modern times, as Edda eventually was assimilated into what became Nigeria.

Today, schools in Edda are well kept because of a traditional reverence for learning. Under a centralized education system, children in Edda are not taught traditional craftsmanship. As a result, there is a lack of capacity for modern craftsmanship for the production of goods, building of infrastructure, and development of technology.

== Government ==
The local government in Edda is headed by an elected chairman and councilors who are elected from wards by the citizens. The first executive chairman was Sonni Ogbuoji. The government of Ebonyi State and Nigeria both also recognize the hereditary monarchs of different ancient kingdoms, called Ezeogo, as traditional rulers and ceremonial cultural heads of their communities, albeit without any political powers.

== Climate ==
There are two distinctive seasons in this area: the rainy and dry season. The rainy season usually begins in early March and ends in October, giving way to the dry season. The dry season usually begins in October and ends in February. Temperatures range from 20 °C to 38 °C during dry season and 16 °C to 28 °C during the rainy season. Average annual rainfall varies from 1750 mm/68.8 in to 2250 mm/88.5 in. The vegetation is a parkland, with stunted trees and pockets of forest, consisting of shrubs and trees. The economy is generally subsistence, with agriculture as the mainstay.

== Notable people ==
- Sonni Ogbuoji, politician
- Sinach, gospel singer

== See also ==
- Amanchor Cave
