= Paulinus Igwe Nwagu =

Nigerian politician

Member of House of Representatives
- In office May 2007 – May 2011
- Preceded by: May 2015
- Constituency: Ezza North/Ishielu

National Senator
- Incumbent
- Assumed office May 2011
- Preceded by: Julius Ucha
- Succeeded by: Obinna Joseph Ogba
- Constituency: Ebonyi Central

Personal details
- Born: 12 June 1959 (age 67)
- Party: People's Democratic Party (PDP)
- Spouse: 1 wife
- Profession: Politician

Paulinus Igwe Nwagu // (born 12 June 1959) is a Nigerian politician who was a representative for Ezza North/Ishielu constituency of Ebonyi State, Nigeria in the House of Representatives. In the April 2011 national elections, he was elected Senator for Ebonyi Central running on the People's Democratic Party (PDP) platform.

== Early life and education ==
Nwagu was born on 12 June 1959, in Ebonyi State. He obtained a bachelor's degree in Political Science. He was Councillor for the Ezza North Local Government Council (1990–1993) and Chairman of the Ezza North Local Government Area (1999–2002).

== Political career ==
Nwagu was elected as a member of the House of Representatives for the Ishielu constituency of Ebonyi's Ezzra North in April 2007, on the PDP platform. In the House, he was appointed to committees on Youth and Social Development, Public Procurement, Police Affairs, Petroleum Resources (Downstream), Environment and Emergency & Disaster Management. He was chairman of the House of Representatives Committee on Rural Development. In 2009, Igwe was arrested and detained at Kuje Prisons in Abuja by the Nigerian anti-crime agency, the Economic and Financial Crimes Commission (EFCC) over his alleged involvement in a N5.2 billion ($34.66 million) electric power scam.

In the January 2011 PDP primaries for the Ebonyi Central Senatorial seat, Nwagu was declared the nominated candidate of the PDP following the boycott of exercise by other contestants for alleged irregularities, including the use of ballot papers meant for Kwara State to conduct the Ebonyi Central election. He won the April 2011 election with 55,016 votes on the PDP platform. Ugo Chima of the All Nigeria Peoples Party (ANPP) received 41,096 votes.

In May 2022, he declared his interest to contest in the gubernatorial election in Ebonyi State. Fourteen aspirants jostled to be the flag-bearer of PDP for the 2023 governorship election; nine from Ebonyi North Senatorial zone including Nwagu, four from Ebonyi Central and one from Ebonyi South. The primaries were later won by Obinna Ogba from Ebonyi Central.

== See also ==
- List of people from Ebonyi State
