= Golden Guinea Breweries =

Nigerian brewery

Golden Guinea Breweries Plc is a Nigerian brewery located in Umuahia, Abia State. It was founded in 1962 by the Eastern Nigerian regional government as an indigenous competitor to foreign manufacturers in the country. The company produces Golden Guinea beer.

Golden Guinea was originally named Independence Brewery Limited, the location was chosen due to the importance of water which led to the selection of a site in Umuahia, the town of the regional premier, Michael Okpara. Production started in 1963 with an annual capacity of 1 million gallons. The company introduced Eagle Stout to the market in 1967 but between 1967 and 1970 further production was hampered by the Nigerian Civil War. In 1971, the company changed its name to the current one, Golden Guinea Breweries. In 1975, the company was revamped and an extension was built by the German firm Coutinho Caro which later participated in an equity offering issued by the firm.

Production at the brewery was hampered by a fire incident in 2003 but recent attempts have been made to resuscitate the firm. The company held franchise rights to produce and market Holsten Brewery's Bergedorf premium lager beer and Bergedorf Malta in Nigeria.
