= Anyimchukwu Ude =

Nigerian politician (1941–2023)

Anyim Ude

Senator of the Federal Republic of Nigeria from Ebonyi State South District
- In office 29 May 2007 – May 2011
- Preceded by: Emmanuel A. Azu
- Succeeded by: Sonni Ogbuoji

Personal details
- Born: 1 June 1941 Iyioji, Akaeze, Ebonyi State, British Nigeria
- Died: 15 May 2023 (aged 81)
- Party: People's Democratic Party

Anyim Chukwu Ude (1 June 1941 – 15 May 2023) was a Nigerian politician who served as a Senator for the Ebonyi South constituency of Ebonyi State, taking office on 29 May 2007. He was a member of the People's Democratic Party (PDP).

== Career in broadcasting ==
Before going to the Senate, Ude had a career in the Nigerian Public Service spanning 42 years. He was a veteran journalist, broadcaster and administrator with vast experience in public service, especially in media matters. He entered the public service of former Eastern Nigeria as a clerk in 1960 and later joined the Eastern Nigeria Information Service, printers and publishers of ‘Nigerian Outlook’ in May 1965 as a reporter. At the end of the Nigerian Civil War in 1970, he trained as a journalist and broadcaster in Nigeria and overseas.

Ude later worked in East Central State Broadcasting Service (ECBS), Nigerian Television Authority (NTA), Imo Broadcasting Service (IBS) and Federal Radio Corporation of Nigeria (FRCN). Senator Ude was the first General Manager of Radio Nigeria, Owerri (1981–1985); first Director-General of Imo Broadcasting Corporation (1985–1991); first Director-General of Broadcasting Corporation of Abia State (1991–1996); first Chief Executive of Ebonyi Broadcasting Service; and first Honourable Commissioner for Commerce, Industry & Tourism, Ebonyi State (1997–1999). Ude was for 161/2 years the Chief Executive of several Broadcasting Establishments thus remaining the longest serving Chief Executive in Nigeria's volatile Broadcasting Industry.

== Other appointments ==
Between 1984 and 2003, he held several special appointments. They include Director, Golden Guinea Breweries, Umuahia (1984–1987); Member, Special Advisory Committee to the Federal Government on Electronic Media Operations (1989–1993); Member, Central Working Committee of the Broadcasting Organisations of Nigeria, BON (1987–1997); chairman, Zone ‘E’ of BON comprising the Eastern States; and chairman, Governing Council of the Federal College of Education (Technical), Umunze in Anambra State (2000–2003).

A former President-General of Old Afikpo Union (OAU) comprising today's Ebonyi South Senatorial Zone, he was also an ordained Ruling Elder of the Presbyterian Church of Nigeria. He was the Chairman of the Presbyterian Joint Hospital, Uburu in Ohaozara Local Government Area of Ebonyi State from 1994 to 2000. He was also a Member, Advisory Council to the Moderator of the General Assembly of the Presbyterian Church of Nigeria. He was decorated a Member of the Order of the Niger by former President Olusegun Obasanjo in 2000 and was one of the six delegates selected to represent Ebonyi State at the 2005 National Political Reform Conference.

== Senate career ==
After taking his seat in the Senate in June 2007, Ude was appointed the Chairman of the Senate Committee on Aviation and served in four other Senate Committees: Defence & Army, Land Transport, Capital Markets and Culture & Tourism. As Chairman of the Aviation Committee, he was at the centre of the successful effort to upgrade the Akanu Ibiam Airport, Enugu to the status of an international airport. He also played a major role in the eventual payment of pensions and gratuities to workers of the defunct Nigeria Airways just as he was doing in the payment of compensation to the families of the 2005/2006 air-crash victims. The committee also investigated the disbursement and utilization of the Aviation Intervention Fund.

Ude sponsored the Social Security Bill in the Senate. He also introduced a number of motions on the Floor of the Senate. As Chairman of the Senate Committee on Aviation, in April 2010, Ude raised concern about security lapses at the nation's airports after an incident in Calabar where a motorist rammed into an airplane that was preparing to take off.

== Death ==
Ude died on 15 May 2023, at the age of 81.

== See also ==
- List of people from Ebonyi State
