= Martin Elechi =

Nigerian economist and politician

Martin Nwancho Elechi
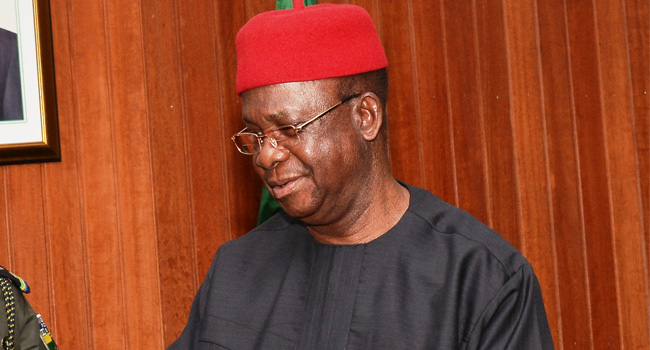

Governor of Ebonyi State
- In office 29 May 2007 – 29 May 2015
- Preceded by: Sam Egwu
- Succeeded by: Dave Umahi

Personal details
- Born: 1941 (7 February or 2 April) Ikwo
- Party: All Progressives Congress
- Spouse: Josephine Elechi

Martin Nwancho Elechi is a Nigerian politician. He served as the governor of Ebonyi State from 2007 to 2015.

== Governor of Ebonyi State ==
He ran in the 2007 Nigerian general election on the People's Democratic Party (PDP) ticket and assumed the position in 2007, succeeding Sam Egwu. Elechi ran successfully for re-election on 26 April 2011. He received more than 50% of the vote, with

One of Elechi's goals as governor was to improve infrastructure in the state. In his time as governor, a set of "Unity Bridges" over the Ebonyi River were built, connecting all regions of the state to Abakaliki, the state capital. Although many of these infrastructure projects were successful, his government was criticized for abandoning a number of projects as well.

In the last few months of Elechi's second term, members of the Ebonyi State House of Assembly raised an impeachment effort against him. It was short-lived, with the leaders of the impeachment movement withdrawing from the impeachment process after deciding that the long-term instability of impeachment outweighed the short-term benefits.

== Later years ==
Elechi's second term as governor ended on 29 May 2015, and he was succeeded by David Umahi. Elechi announced his retirement from "active" politics in 2016.

In 2017 Elechi left the People Democratic Party (PDP) for All Progressives Congress (APC). He credited his change to concerns about the leadership of the PDP, as well as his personal fondness for President Muhammadu Buhari, a member of the APC.

== See also ==
- List of people from Ebonyi State
- List of state governors of Nigeria
- List of governors of Ebonyi State
