= Sonni Ogbuoji =

Nigerian politician

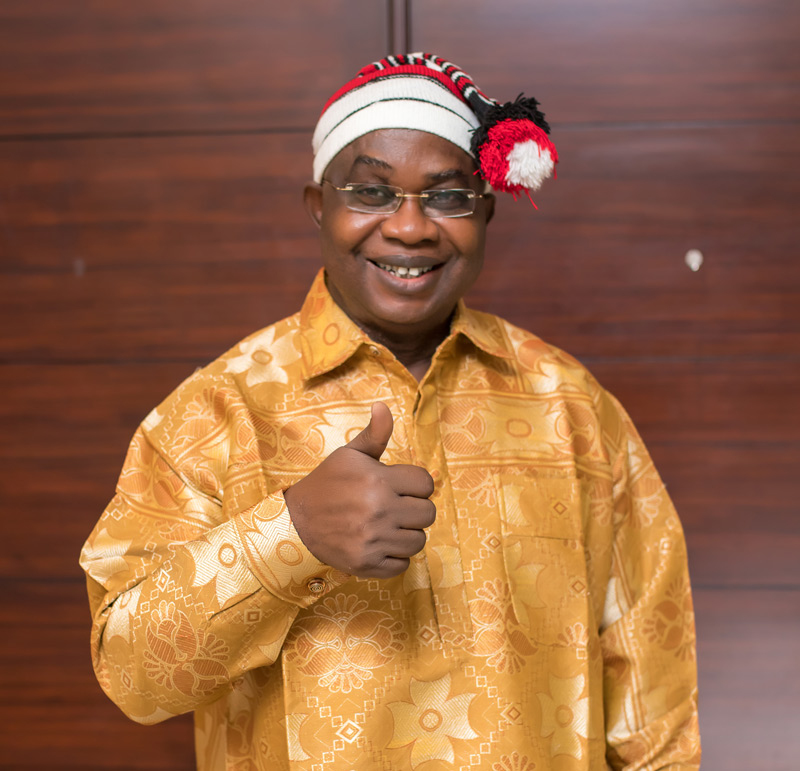

Senator for Ebonyi South
- In office May 2011 – May 2019
- Preceded by: Anyimchukwu Ude
- Succeeded by: Michael Ama Nnachi

Personal details
- Party: All Progressives Party (Nigeria) (APC)
- Website: sonniogbuoji.com

Sonni Ogbuoji is a Nigerian politician who was elected Senator for Ebonyi South, in Ebonyi State, Nigeria in the 9 April 2011 national elections. He was elected on the People's Democratic Party (PDP) ticket. He left the senate in the 2019. Sonni hails from Ebunwana Edda in Afikpo South local government area of Ebonyi state.

Ogbuoji was the local government chairman of Afikpo local government area during the military regime before the start of the Nigerian Fourth Republic.

Ogbuoji was Commissioner for Economic Empowerment and Poverty Reduction in the government of Martin Elechi. In this role he supervised construction and stocking of 35 catfish ponds in an effort to provide youth employment. In November 2010 Ogbuoji, resigned from this post. He remained the Ebonyi coordinator for the Goodluck / Sambo Presidential campaign.

Ogbuoji won 65,735 votes in the April 2011 senatorial election for Ebonyi South. Idu Igariwey of the All Nigeria Peoples Party (ANPP) followed with 16,501 and Darlington Okere of the Action Congress of Nigeria (ACN) got 11,602.

== Birth and education ==
He was born on 29 September 1954 to late Mr. Ogbu Nnachi Oji and Mrs. Mary Mai Oji of Ebunwana, Afikpo South (Edda) LGA, Ebonyi State and attended Edda Central School, Ebunwana between 1964 and 1970. He attended Government College Umuahia, between 1971 and 1975 and University of Nigeria, Nsukka, between 1976 and 1981 with bachelor's degree in agriculture.

== Politics and public office ==
Elected Chairman of old Afikpo Local Government (Afikpo North and South) Elected pioneer Chairman of Afikpo South LGA 1991–1993 National Publicity Secretary of the defunct GDM (1996–1998). Chairman of Ebonyi State Secondary Education Board 2003–2006 Member, Ebonyi State Committee on Vision 20:20:20 (2009) Commissioner for Economic Empowerment and Poverty Reduction 2009 Senator representing Ebonyi South (2011–2015) Second Term Senator (2015–2019) Board member, Nigerian Shippers' Council (NSC) Board member, Nigerian Geological Survey Agency (NGSA) In the Senate Vice Chairman: Senate Committees on Appropriations and Special Duties Membership: Agriculture, Education, Defence, Air Force, Foreign Affairs, Poverty Alleviation, Senate Services, SDGs, States and Local Governments.

== Awards/chieftaincy recognitions ==
Fellow of Technology by Akanu Ibiam Federal Polytechnic Unwana, Fellow of Technology by Akanu Ibiam Federal Polytechnic Unwana Vocational Service Award by Rotary Club of AfikpoMerit Award by Nigerian Institute of Animal Science Ebonyi Ambassador by Ebonyi Professionals Forum Award of Excellence by National Association of Imo State Students U.IMerit Award by Animal Science Association of Nigeria, South East Zone1 Omeudo of Amangwu Edda (Peace Maker) Agubata of Umunna Edda (Strength of a Lion) Ochioha of Oso and Ebunwana Edda (Leader of the people) Enyioha of Etiti Edda (Friend of the Masses) Onioku of Oziza, Afikpo (The giver of light) Omereoha of Akpoha, Afikpo (The Philanthropist) Ife Edda The light of Edda people

== Personal ==
Ogbuoji enjoys playing the tennis, travelling and reading. He is married to Scholastica Ugo Ogbuoji and has two sons.

== See also ==
- List of people from Ebonyi State
