= Michael Ama Nnachi =

Nigerian politician

Senator for Ebonyi South
- In office June 2019 – May 2023
- Succeeded by: David Umahi

Personal details
- Born: 6 August 1964 (age 62) Ebonyi State
- Party: People's Democratic Party (PDP)
- Education: Enugu State University of Science and Technology
- Profession: Politician; Quantity Surveyor

Michael Ama Nnachi (born 6 August 1964) is a Nigerian Politician and Quantity Surveyor, he is the senator representing Ebonyi South Senatorial District of Ebonyi State at the Nigerian 9th National Assembly.

== Education ==
Nnachi attended Government College Afikpo. He obtained B.Sc. in Quantity Surveying from Enugu State University of Science and Technology in 1997, In 2000, he obtained his master's degree in Environmental Management at the same Enugu State University of Science and Technology .

== Professional career ==
Michael Ama Nnachi is a fellow at Nigerian Institute of Quantity Surveyors( and Corporate Administration of Nigeria (FCAI). He is a member of Environmental Management Association of Nigeria (MEMAN) and Nigerian Institute of Chartered Arbitrators (MCArb)

== Political career ==
Sen. Michael, functions as the Vice Chairman at Poverty Alleviation and Social Investment Program Committee from June 2019 till June 2023. He is also the vice-chairman at Air Force Committee which started from June 2019 until June 2023 In the February 23, 2019 Ebonyi south Senatorial district Election, he polled 103,751 votes to defeat his rival Mr. Onu Nweze of the APC, who polled 19,663 votes.

== Awards and honours ==
- Zenith Achievers International Merit Award.
- African International Merit Award.
- Best Youth Corper Award 1998/89, Gongola State
