= Joseph Ogba =

Nigerian politician

Joseph Obinna Ogba

Member of the Senate of Nigeria for Ebonyi Central
- Incumbent
- Assumed office 9 June 2015

Commissioner for Youths and Sports Ebonyi State
- In office 2000–2001
- In office 2019 - date

Personal details
- Born: 1961 (age 64–65) Ishielu, Ebonyi State, Nigeria
- Committees: Chairman Committee on Sports

Joseph Obinna Ogba (born 1961 in Ebonyi State, Nigeria) is a Nigerian politician. He is the senator representing Ebonyi Central senatorial district in the Nigerian Senate. He is a member of the 8th National Assembly in Nigeria and also senator-elect in the 9th republic of the National Assembly.

== Personal life and education ==
Joseph Ogba was born in 1961 in Nkalagu, Ishielu Local Government Area of Ebonyi State, Nigeria. He was raised in Ishielu briefly. Ogba attended Command Secondary School in Nkalagu where he received his General Certificate of Education in 1975. He then attended Federal Polytechnic, Oko where he obtained a Diploma and Higher National Diploma in Mass Communication.

== Career ==
Ogba started his career as a referee in the Nigerian Football Referee Association in 1986. In 1995, he was appointed Chairman of Nigeria Football Referee Council (Anambra State Chapter) and served in that position till 1997. In 1997, he was appointed a member of Federal Government Delegation to United States on Image Building.

=== Political career ===
In 1998, he went into politics and was elected Chairman of Ishielu local government in Ebonyi State. Subsequently he was appointed Chairman of Chairmen (ALGON) in Ebonyi State. Due to his experience in football, he was appointed Chairman, Ebonyi Angels Football Club in 1999 up till 2002.

While still serving as Chairman of Ebonyi Angels, he was appointed Commissioner for Youths and Sports, Ebonyi State in 2002. In 2003, after serving as commissioner he was appointed the Chairman of Football Association in Ebonyi State. In 2006, he was the Chairman of the marketing and sponsor committee of Nigeria Football Federation.

During the 2015 general elections in Nigeria, Ogba contested for the senate and was elected to represent Ebonyi Central senatorial district. He was appointed Chairman committee on sports in the Nigerian senate. In 2019, he was re-elected into the Nigerian senate for a second term.

== See also ==
- List of people from Ebonyi State
