= Julius Ucha =

Nigerian politician

Julius Ali Ucha

Senator for Ebonyi Central
- In office 29 May 2003 – May 2011
- Preceded by: Obasi V. Usulor
- Succeeded by: Paulinus Igwe Nwagu

Personal details
- Born: 19 October 1958 (age 67) Ebonyi State, Nigeria
- Party: All progressives Congress(APC)

Julius Ucha (born 19 October 1958) was elected Senator for the Ebonyi Central constituency of Ebonyi State, Nigeria, taking office on 29 May 2003, and was reelected in 2007. He is a member of the All Progressives Congress(APC).

Ucha earned an LL.B degree from Anambra State University of Science & Technology. He was a member of the old Enugu State Board of Mercy. He was elected a member of the Ebonyi State House of Assembly, where he was appointed Speaker. After returning to the Senate in 2007 Ucha was appointed to committees on Works, Senate Services, Inter-Parliamentary Affairs, Independent National Electoral Commission and Commerce. In a mid-term evaluation of Senators in May 2009, ThisDay said he had not sponsored any bills but had sponsored or co-sponsored several motions.

== See also ==
- List of people from Ebonyi State
