= Sam Egwu =

Nigerian politician

Sam Ominyi Egwu
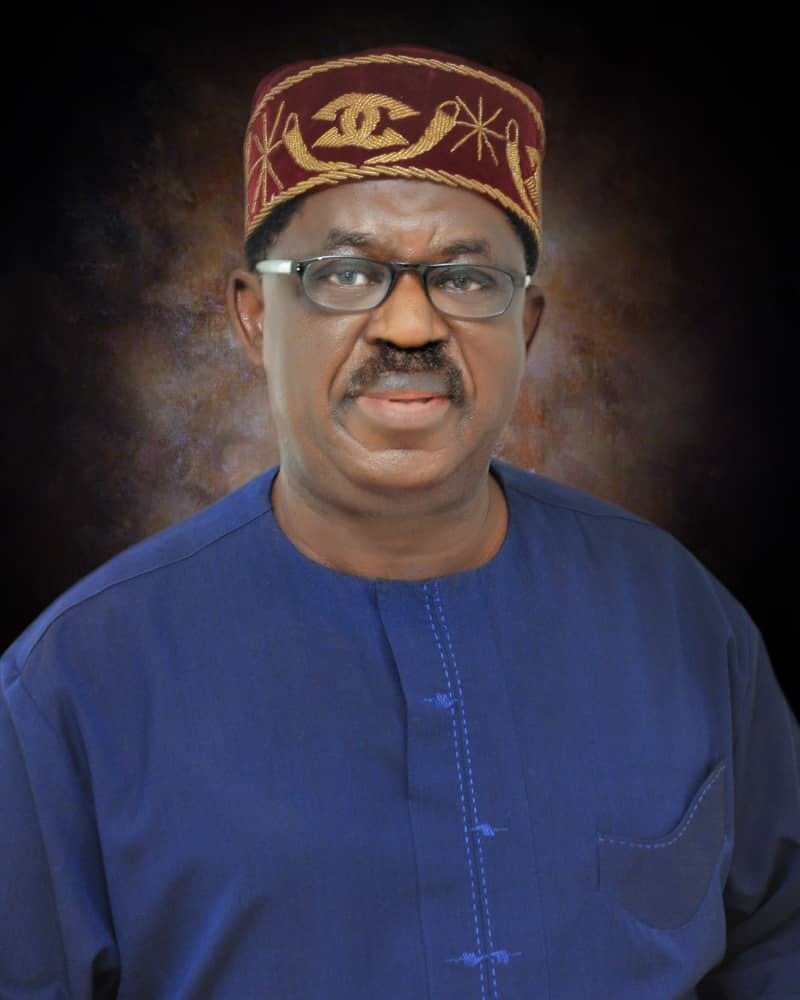

Senator for the Ebonyi State North District
- In office 29 May 2015 – 14 June 2023
- Preceded by: Christopher Nwankwo

Governor of Ebonyi State
- In office 29 May 1999 – 29 May 2007
- Preceded by: Simeon Oduoye
- Succeeded by: Martin Elechi

Minister of Education
- In office 17 December 2008 – 17 March 2010
- Preceded by: Igwe Aja-Nwachukwu
- Succeeded by: Ruqayyah Ahmed Rufa'i

Personal details
- Born: 20 June 1954 (age 72)
- Party: People's Democratic Party (PDP)

Sam Ominyi Egwu CON (born 20 June 1954) is a Nigerian politician and member of People's Democratic Party (PDP) in Nigeria. He was elected Governor of Ebonyi State in the 1999 Ebonyi State gubernatorial election from 29 May 1999 to 29 May 2007. Dr Egwu is noted as pillar of educational development in Ebonyi state and Nigeria. He attended the University of Nigeria, Nsukka where he obtained a bachelor's degree in Agriculture in 1981. He later received a master's degrees in Agricultural from the University of Nigeria, Nsukka in 1987 and Doctorate in Agronomy from Enugu State University of Technology in 1996. He was a senior lecturer at Enugu State University of Technology and served as commissioner for education in Ebonyi state contributed to the successes recorded in education sector during his tenure as governor.

In 2008, President Umaru Yar'Adua appointed him Minister of Education, position he held till April 2010 when he was replaced by Professor Ruqayyah Ahmed Rufa'i.

Egwu was former President Olusegun Obasanjo's choice to become National Chairman of the PDP at its 2008 National Convention. However, at the convention on 8 March 2008, he withdrew in favour of the compromise candidate Prince Vincent Ogbulafor, who was chosen as an alternative to Egwu and his main rival for the position, Anyim Pius Anyim.

His stay as education minister was characterized by ASUU (Academic Staff Union of Universities) and other university union strikes. This led to people demanding his sacking.

In 2015, he successfully contested the senatorial seat for Ebonyi North Senatorial Zone on the platform of People's Democratic Party. Currently, he is the Senate committee chairman on industry. He is from Ohaukwu LGA of the state.

== Awards and honours ==
- Commander of the Order of the Niger (CON).
- D.Sc. (Honoriscausa) by University of Nigeria, Nsukka, 2006.
- D.Sc. (Honoriscausa) by Ebonyi State University, Abakaliki, 2008.

== See also ==
- List of governors of Ebonyi State
- List of people from Ebonyi State
