= 2023 Ebonyi State gubernatorial election =

- 18 March 2023
- Registered: 1,597,646
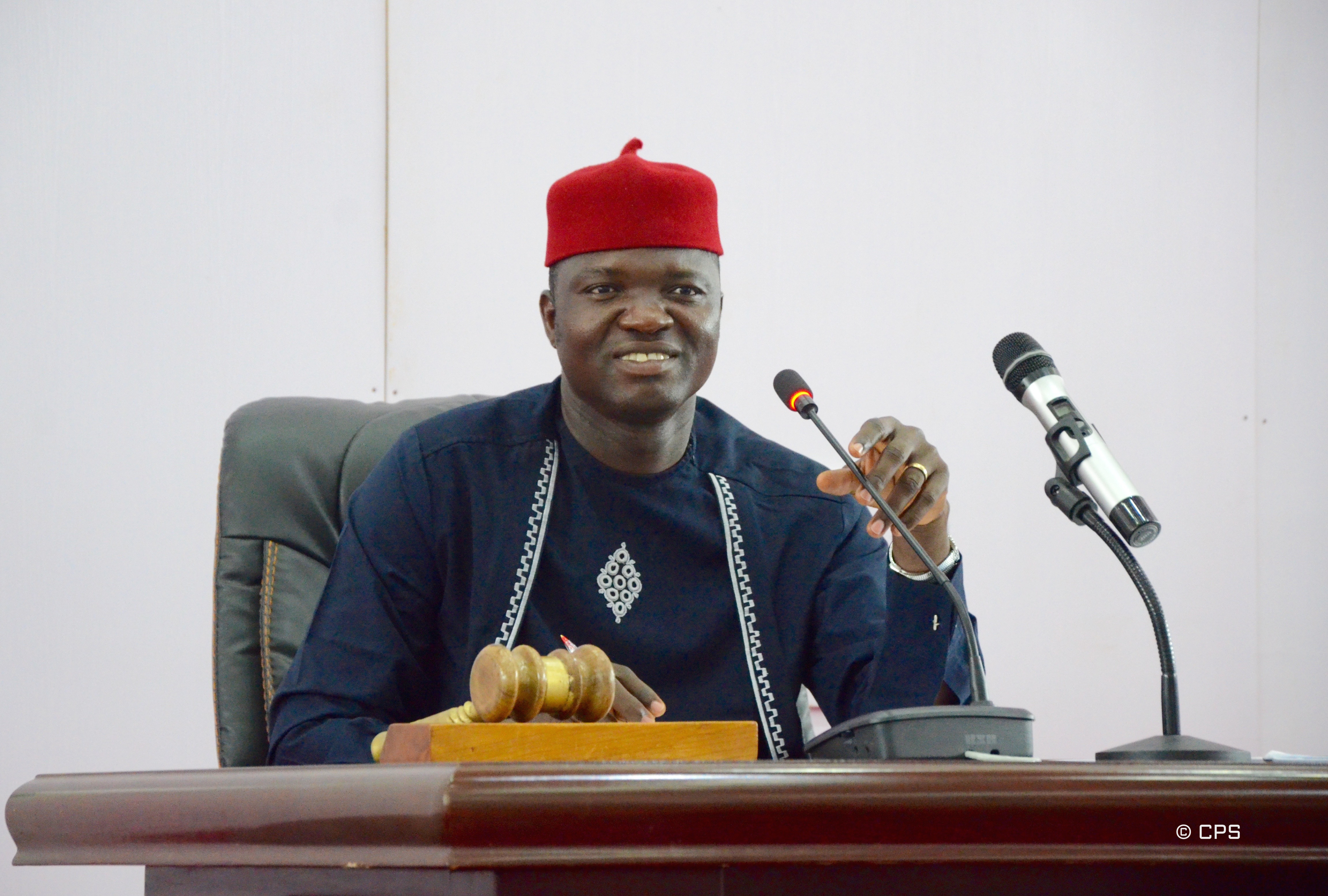
		PDP	APGA
Nominee	Francis Nwifuru	Ifeanyi Odii	Bernard Odoh
Party	APC	PDP	APGA
Running mate	Patricia Obila	Paulinus Igwe Nwagu	Nkata Chuku
Popular vote	199,131	80,191	52,189
Percentage	58.13%	23.41%	15.24%
Governor before election
Dave Umahi
APC
Elected Governor
Francis Nwifuru
APC

The 2023 Ebonyi State gubernatorial election was held on 18 March 2023, to elect the Governor of Ebonyi State, concurrent with elections to the Ebonyi State House of Assembly as well as twenty-seven other gubernatorial elections and elections to all other state houses of assembly. The election — which was postponed from its original 11 March date — was held three weeks after the presidential election and National Assembly elections. Incumbent APC Governor Dave Umahi was term-limited and could not seek re-election to a third term. Speaker of the House of Assembly Francis Nwifuru held the office for the APC by a margin of 35% over first runner-up and PDP nominee — businessman Ifeanyi Odii.

Party primaries were scheduled for between 4 April and 9 June 2022 with the All Progressives Grand Alliance nominating former Secretary to the State Government Bernard Odoh on 29 May while both the All Progressives Congress and the Peoples Democratic Party had two separate parallel primaries. For the APC, one primary nominated Nwifuru on 26 May while another was won by former Revenue Mobilisation Allocation and Fiscal Commission chairman Elias Mbam on the same day; in the PDP, one primary nominated Odii on 30 May as a different primary nominated Senator for Ebonyi Central Joseph Ogba on 6 June. By July, INEC recognised Nwifuru as the APC nominee while the PDP nomination was awarded to Odii by the Supreme Court in September.

The day after the election, collation completed and INEC declared Nwifuru as the victor. In the full results, Nwifuru won about 199,000 votes and 58% of the vote as runner-up Odii received over 80,000 votes and 23% of the vote while Odoh came third with around 52,000 votes and 15% of the vote. Odii rejected the official results and filed legal challenges; the proceedings eventually reached the Supreme Court, which affirmed the victory of Nwifuru in a January 2024 judgment.

== Electoral system ==
The Governor of Ebonyi State is elected using a modified two-round system. To be elected in the first round, a candidate must receive the plurality of the vote and over 25% of the vote in at least two-thirds of state local government areas. If no candidate passes this threshold, a second round will be held between the top candidate and the next candidate to have received a plurality of votes in the highest number of local government areas.

== Background ==
Ebonyi State is a small, Igbo-majority southeastern state with a growing economy and vast natural areas but facing an underdeveloped yet vital agricultural sector, rising debt, and a low COVID-19 vaccination rate.

Politically, the state's 2019 elections were categorized as a continuation of the PDP's control as Umahi won with over 81% of the vote and the party won every seat in the House of Assembly along with all three senate seats. However, the PDP did lose one House of Representatives seat to the APC after a court ruling and although the state was easily won by PDP presidential nominee Atiku Abubakar, it still swung towards Buhari compared to 2015 and had lower turnout. In the interim between 2019 and 2023, the state's political landscape drastically changed as Umahi defecting to the APC in November 2020 set in motion a wave of other defections that gave the APC control of the House of Assembly. While the defections massively improved the APC's southeastern standing, the legal ramifications are still unknown as a high court briefly removed Umahi and all assemblymembers who also defected from office in March 2022 until the decision was overturned on appeal; it has been appealed further.

Ahead of his second term, Umahi stated focuses included agriculture, economic development, and resource development; however, he was criticized for authoritarian-esque actions. Alarms were raised after Umahi's defection when he ordered security forces to lock the state PDP secretariat in 2021 and when the state PDP spokesman was arrested for criticizing Umahi in 2022; he was also accused of using security forces to harass critics and political opponents. At other points during his administration, Umahi was given praise for economic diversification and increasing government transparency while receiving further criticism for blaming IPOB attacks on politicians without evidence and ranting against the judiciary.

== Primary elections ==
The primaries, along with any potential challenges to primary results, were to take place between 4 April and 3 June 2022 but the deadline was extended to 9 June. An informal zoning gentlemen's agreement sets the Ebonyi North Senatorial District to have the next governor as Ebonyi North has not held the governorship since 2007. However, some groups such as the Association of Ebonyi State Indigenes in the Diaspora claimed that as one full rotation of districts would be complete in 2023, further zoning was unnecessary. On the other hand, some leaders in the Izzi subgroup of the Igbo people claim that not only should the governorship be zoned to Ebonyi North, it should go to the Izzi as former Governor Sam Egwu was from a non-Izzi area of Ebonyi North. Meanwhile, some leaders in the Ezaa subgroup of the Igbo people called for their group to hold the governorship as the Ezaa are one of the largest subgroups in the state.

Eventually, the PDP settled on zoning to the "Abakaliki bloc" (the North and Central Senatorial Districts) while APGA and the APC declined to formally zone their nominations.

=== All Progressives Congress ===
Ahead of the primary, the state APC constituted a zoning committee that submitted its report in April 2022; along with the zoning committee, Umahi also asked leaders from both the Ezaa and Izzi subethnic groups to put forward candidates. While Ezaa APC leaders settled on former Senator Julius Ucha at a meeting in Onueke, the Izzi process was much more contentious as Izzi stakeholders were reportedly divided between backing RMFAC Chairman Elias Mbam or Assembly Speaker Francis Ogbonna Nwifuru. After Mbam eventually won out, Nwifuru supporters rushed to endorse him anyway while other Izzi leaders chastised the supportive statement.

Another cause of intraparty strife were rumours that Umahi was personally supporting Nwifuru. This speculation was confirmed on 23 April 2022 when Umahi endorsed Nwifuru while at a funeral. Ucha and other candidates derided Umahi's endorsement of Nwifuru as 'undemocratic imposition' that was characteristic of his "high-handed" party leadership style. In response, an Umahi aide claimed the endorsement was based on the wide support Nwifuru received from stakeholders and that Umahi's would not prevent internal democracy during the primary.

On 20 April 2022, the APC National Executive Committee announced the party's schedule for gubernatorial primaries, setting its expression of interest form price at ₦10 million and nomination form price at ₦40 million with a 50% nomination form discount for candidates younger than 40 while women and candidates with disabilities get free nomination forms. Forms were to be sold from 26 April to 6 May until the deadline was later extended to 10 May then 12 May. After the submission of nomination forms by 13 May, candidates were screened by a party committee on 14 and 15 May while 16 May was the date for the screening appeal process. Ward congresses and LGA congresses were set for between 7 and 9 May to elect delegates for the primary. Candidates approved by the screening process advanced to a primary set for 26 May, in concurrence with other APC gubernatorial primaries; challenges to the result could be made the next day.

On the primary date, two separate factional primaries were held with the grouping backed by Umahi and the state party holding an indirect primary at the Pa Ngele Oruta Township Stadium while the faction supported by Mbam held an indirect primary at Mbam's campaign office. After both primaries were peacefully held, the Stadium primary ended in Nwifuru winning by a wide margin while the Mbam factional primary resulted in his victory. Nwifuru was recognized as the legitimate nominee in July by INEC.

==== Nominated ====
- Francis Nwifuru: House of Assembly member for Izzi West (2011–present) and Speaker of the House of Assembly (2015–present)
  - Running mate—Patricia Obila: Afikpo North Local Government Vice Chairman

==== Eliminated in primary ====
- Elias Mbam: Chairman of the Revenue Mobilization Allocation and Fiscal Commission (2010–2015; 2019–2022) and former commissioner (1999–2005)
- Edward Nkwegu: Chairman of Ebonyi State Extended Special Public Works Programme of the Federal Government, 2019 APC gubernatorial candidate, and 2015 LP gubernatorial nominee (defected after the primary to the LP)
- Rosemary Ofoke Nwogbaga
- Julius Ucha: member of the National Assembly Service Commission (2020–present), 2015 APC gubernatorial nominee, 2011 ACN gubernatorial nominee, former Senator for Ebonyi Central (2003–2011), former House of Assembly member, and former Speaker of the House of Assembly

==== Withdrew ====
- Nnanna Igwe: medical doctor

==== Declined ====
- Augustine Nwankwegu: former state Attorney General (2015–2017), former House of Assembly member for Izzi West, and former Speaker of the House of Assembly
- Godwin Ogbaga: former acting Secretary to the State Government and former Minister of State for Power and Steel (1998–1999)
- Sonni Ogbuoji: former Senator for Ebonyi South (2011–2019), 2019 APC gubernatorial nominee, former Commissioner for Economic Empowerment and Poverty Reduction (2009–2010), and former Afikpo South Local Government Chairman
- Kenneth Ugbala: Secretary to the State Government (2019–2022)

==== Results ====
Candidates' vote share
1. Francis Nwifuru (87.8%)
2. Rosemary Ofoke Nwogbaga (7.45%)
3. Other candidates (4.73%)

APC primary results
Party	Candidate	Votes	%
APC	Francis Nwifuru	743	87.82%
APC	Rosemary Ofoke Nwogbaga	63	7.45%
APC	Julius Ucha	22	2.60%
APC	Elias Mbam	10	1.18%
APC	Edward Nkwegu	8	0.95%
Total votes		846	100.00%
Invalid or blank votes		8	N/A
Turnout		854	Unknown

Invalid Mbam office primary results
Candidates' vote share
1. ~~Elias Mbam~~ (98.2%)
2. ~~Other candidates~~ (1.85%)

~~APC Mbam office primary results~~
Party	Candidate	Votes	%
APC	~~Elias Mbam~~	741	98.15%
APC	~~Francis Nwifuru~~	7	0.93%
APC	~~Julius Ucha~~	4	0.53%
APC	~~Edward Nkwegu~~	2	0.26%
APC	~~Rosemary Ofoke Nwogbaga~~	1	0.13%
Total votes		755	100.00%
Invalid or blank votes		22	N/A
Turnout		777	Unknown

=== All Progressives Grand Alliance ===
In early April 2022, state APGA Chairman Ricky Okorouka announced that the state party would not zone its gubernatorial nomination.

On 25 March 2022, the national APGA announced its primary schedule, setting its expression of interest form price at ₦3 million and the nomination form price at ₦12 million with a 50% discount for women candidates and candidates with disabilities. Forms are to be sold from 29 March to 11 April; after the purchase of forms, gubernatorial candidates are to be screened by a party committee on 22 and 23 April while the screening appeal process is slated for 5 May. Ward congresses are set for 10 May to elect delegates for the primary. Candidates approved by the screening process advanced to a primary set for 29 May, in concurrence with all other APGA gubernatorial primaries; challenges to the result could be made on 31 May.

On the primary date, former Secretary to the State Government Bernard Odoh was the sole candidate and won the nomination unopposed. In his acceptance speech, Odoh derided the APC and PDP along with pledging to lead APGA to victory.

==== Nominated ====
- Bernard Odoh: 2019 APC gubernatorial candidate and former Secretary to the State Government (2015–2018)

Running mate—Nkata Chuku

==== Results ====
APGA primary results
Party	Candidate	Votes	%
APGA	Bernard Odoh	513	100.00%
Total votes		513	100.00%

=== Peoples Democratic Party ===
In late September 2021, State PDP Chairman Fred Udeogu announced that the state party had zoned its gubernatorial nomination to the "Abakaliki bloc" (the North and Central Senatorial Districts).

On 16 March 2022, the national PDP announced its gubernatorial primaries' schedule, setting its expression of interest form price at ₦1 million and the nomination form price at ₦20 million with a 50% discount for candidates between 25 and 30. Forms were to be sold until 1 April but the party later extended the deadline four times before reaching a final deadline of 22 April. After the submission of nomination forms by 25 April, candidates were screened by a party committee on 28 April while 2 May was the rescheduled date for the screening appeal process. Ward congresses were set for 29 April and LGA congresses were rescheduled for 10 May to elect delegates for the primary. Candidates approved by the screening process advanced to a primary set for 25 May, in concurrence with all other PDP gubernatorial primaries; challenges to the result could be made in the following days.

On the primary date, the national PDP abruptly cancelled the gubernatorial primary along with all other Ebonyi PDP primaries due to court ruling over state party leadership. Before the national leadership set a new primary date, a party faction led by ousted state chairman Silas Onu held its own election, nominating businessman Ifeanyi Chukwuma Odii by a wide margin. The national party and its recognized state chairman, Tochukwu Okorie, rejected the primary and held their own primary on 6 June; it was won by Senator Joseph Ogba. However, the next day, a Federal High Court annulled the Okorie factional primary and declared the Odii-won primary as legitimate. The court battle continued afterwards until 14 September when the Supreme Court ruled in favor of Odii and declared him the legitimate nominee. INEC briefly removed Odii as recognized nominee in December 2022 due to renewed litigation but he was returned to the list of candidates by late January.

==== Nominated ====
- Ifeanyi Chukwuma Odii: businessman

==== Eliminated in primary ====
- Edwin Anayo: House of Representatives member for Ezza North/Ishielu (2015–present)
- Emmanuel Ezeh: President of Ebonyi Chambers of Commerce, Industry, Mines and Agriculture
- Austin Igwe-Edeze
- Paulinus Igwe Nwagu: former Senator for Ebonyi Central (2011–2015), former House of Representatives member for Ezza North/Ishielu (2007–2011), and former Ezza North Local Government Chairman (1999–2002)
- Fidelis Nwankwo: former Minister of State for Health and former Izzi Local Government Chairman
- Augustine Nwazunku: former Secretary of the Ebonyi State Agency for Control of AIDS and brother of opponent Chukwuma Nwazunku
- Chukwuma Nwazunku: House of Representatives member for Abakaliki/Izzi (2015–present), former House of Assembly member, former Speaker of the House of Assembly, and brother of opponent Augustine Nwazunku
- Adaeze Nwuzor: former Ebonyi Local Government Chairman
- Joseph Ogba: Senator for Ebonyi Central (2015–present), former Commissioner for Youths and Sports (2002–2003), and former Ishielu Local Government Chairman
  - Running mate—Oliver Osi: House of Assembly member for Ivo
- Sylvester Ogbaga: House of Representatives member for Abakaliki/Izzi (2007–present) and former Abakaliki Local Government Chairman
- Chris Usulor: House of Assembly member for Ezza South (2011–present) and son of former Ebonyi Central Senator Vincent Obasi Usulor

==== Declined ====
- Chukwuma Nwandiugo: former Commissioner for Works and Transport

==== Results ====
Candidates' vote share
1. Ifeanyi Chukwuma Odii (93.1%)
2. Other candidates (6.93%)

PDP Onu factional primary results
Party	Candidate	Votes	%
PDP	Ifeanyi Chukwuma Odii	349	93.07%
PDP	Chris Usulor	9	2.40%
PDP	Sylvester Ogbaga	8	2.13%
PDP	Andrew Sunday Opoke	6	1.60%
PDP	Emmanuel Ezeh	1	0.27%
PDP	Augustine Nwazunku	1	0.27%
PDP	Chukwuma Nwazunku	1	0.27%
PDP	Other candidates	0	0.00%
Total votes		367	100.00%

Invalid Okorie factional primary results
Candidates' vote share
1. Joseph Ogba (52.4%)
2. Edwin Anayo (22.8%)
3. Sylvester Ogbaga (13.0%)
4. Fidelis Nwankwo (9.11%)
5. Other candidates (2.69%)

PDP Okorie factional primary results
Party	Candidate	Votes	%
PDP	Joseph Ogba	253	52.38%
PDP	Edwin Anayo	110	22.78%
PDP	Sylvester Ogbaga	63	13.04%
PDP	Fidelis Nwankwo	44	9.11%
PDP	Chukwuma Nwazunku	6	1.24%
PDP	Austin Igwe-Edeze	3	0.62%
PDP	Paulinus Igwe Nwagu	2	0.41%
PDP	Ifeanyi Chukwuma Odii	1	0.21%
PDP	Augustine Nwazunku	1	0.21%
PDP	Adaeze Nwuzor	0	0.00%
Total votes		483	100.00%
Invalid or blank votes		14	N/A
Turnout		497	Unknown

=== Minor parties ===
- Chukwuma Awuregu Nwandugo (Action Alliance)
  - Running mate: Cordelia Chiaka Ugboaja
- Kenneth Nwabueze Oziomaeze (Action Democratic Party)
  - Running mate: Ogochukwu Jonah Okorie
- Apollos Ndubisi Okpara (Action Peoples Party)
  - Running mate: Elijah Umoke
- Bernard Nyaba Nwonomara (African Democratic Congress)
  - Running mate: Solomon Ogbonna Okoh
- Chinenye Judith Igwe (Allied Peoples Movement)
  - Running mate: Kingsley Chukwuma Aliede
- Edward Nkwegu (Labour Party)
  - Running mate: Ajah Nwabueze Igwe
- Chris Soni Adol-Awam (New Nigeria Peoples Party)
  - Running mate: Nkechinyere B. Okochi
- Anthony N. Usulor (National Rescue Movement)
  - Running mate: Evo Christopher Ogbonnaya
- Micheal Ikechukwu Nwankwo (Social Democratic Party)
  - Running mate: Iheanacho Nwugo
- Sunday Andrew Opoke (Young Progressives Party)
  - Running mate: Sunday Ogbonnaya Okoro

== Campaign ==
Much of the general election campaign was dominated by internal party disputes that often led to extensive legal battles. The nominations of both Nwifuru and Odii were challenged by the winners of their parties' parallel primaries with the PDP case rising to the Supreme Court. For the state PDP, the court cases were only a part of its wider internal crisis. By 2023, attention mainly switched to the presidential election on 25 February. In the election, Ebonyi State voted for Peter Obi (LP); Obi won the state with 79.8% of the vote, beating Bola Tinubu (APC) at 13.0% and Atiku Abubakar (PDP) at 4.2%. Although the result was unsurprising—Ebonyi is in Obi's southeastern stronghold and projections had favored him—the result led to increased attention on the chances of LP gubernatorial nominee Edward Nkwegu as opposed to Nwifuru, Odoh, or Odii. However, the LP nomination itself was embroiled in legal action which culminated in the removal of Nkwegu as nominee. In the wake of the presidential election and the court ruling sacking Nkwegu, analysts focused on various factors including regional strength by candidate, internal party relations, and zoning dynamics.

== Projections ==
Source	Projection	As of
Africa Elects (Note: AfricaElects projections predict the likelihood of a candidate winning a state by categorizing a state as "Safe" for exceedingly likely, "Likely" for somewhat likely, and "Lean" for least likely. If no clear determination could be made, states are categorized as "tossups".)	Tossup	17 March 2023
Enough is Enough- SBM Intelligence (Note: EiE-SBM projections predict which candidates will win states.)	Odii	2 March 2023

== Conduct ==
=== Electoral timetable ===
On 26 February 2022, the Independent National Electoral Commission released the timetable, setting out key dates and deadlines for the election. Months later on 27 May 2022, INEC made a slight revision to the timetable, allowing parties extra time to conduct primaries.

- 28 February 2022 – Publication of Notice of Election
- 4 April 2022 – First day for the conduct of party primaries
- 9 June 2022 (Note: The original deadline was 3 June; however, INEC pushed it back to 9 June at the behest of parties.) – Final day for the conduct of party primaries, including the resolution of disputes arising from them
- 1 July 2022 – First day for submission of nomination forms to INEC via the online portal
- 15 July 2022 – Final day for submission of nomination forms to INEC via the online portal
- 12 October 2022 – Commencement of the official campaign period
- 16 March 2023 (Note: The original deadline was 9 March; however, INEC pushed it back to 16 March.) – Final day of the official campaign period

== General election ==
=== Results ===
2023 Ebonyi State gubernatorial election
Party	Candidate	Votes	%
AA	Chukwuma Awuregu Nwandugo		
ADP	Kenneth Nwabueze Oziomaeze		
APP	Apollos Ndubisi Okpara		
ADC	Bernard Nyaba Nwonomara		
APM	Chinenye Judith Igwe		
APC	Francis Nwifuru		
APGA	Bernard Odoh		
LP	Edward Nkwegu		
New Nigeria Peoples Party	Chris Soni Adol-Awam		
NRM	Anthony N. Usulor		
PDP	Ifeanyi Odii		
SDP	Micheal Ikechukwu Nwankwo		
YPP	Sunday Andrew Opoke		
ZLP			
Total votes			100.00%
Invalid or blank votes			N/A
Turnout			

==== By senatorial district ====
The results of the election by senatorial district.

Senatorial District	Francis Nwifuru APC		Bernard Odoh APGA		Ifeanyi Odii PDP		Others		Total Valid Votes
Senatorial District	Votes	Percentage	Votes	Percentage	Votes	Percentage	Votes	Percentage	Total Valid Votes
Ebonyi Central Senatorial District (Note: Comprising the local government areas of Ezza North, Ezza South, Ikwo, and Ishielu.)	TBD	%	TBD	%	TBD	%	TBD	%	TBD
Ebonyi North Senatorial District (Note: Comprising the local government areas of Abakaliki, Ebonyi, Izzi, and Ohaukwu.)	TBD	%	TBD	%	TBD	%	TBD	%	TBD
Ebonyi South Senatorial District (Note: Comprising the local government areas of Afikpo North, Afikpo South, Ivo, Ohaozara, and Onicha.)	TBD	%	TBD	%	TBD	%	TBD	%	TBD
Totals	TBD	%	TBD	%	TBD	%	TBD	%	TBD

==== By federal constituency ====
The results of the election by federal constituency.

Federal Constituency	Francis Nwifuru APC		Bernard Odoh APGA		Ifeanyi Odii PDP		Others		Total Valid Votes
Federal Constituency	Votes	Percentage	Votes	Percentage	Votes	Percentage	Votes	Percentage	Total Valid Votes
Abakaliki/Izzi Federal Constituency (Note: Comprising the local government areas of Abakaliki and Izzi.)	TBD	%	TBD	%	TBD	%	TBD	%	TBD
Afikpo North/Afikpo South Federal Constituency (Note: Comprising the local government areas of Afikpo North and Afikpo South.)	TBD	%	TBD	%	TBD	%	TBD	%	TBD
Ebonyi/Ohaukwu Federal Constituency (Note: Comprising the local government areas of Ebonyi and Ohaukwu.)	TBD	%	TBD	%	TBD	%	TBD	%	TBD
Ezza North/Ishielu Federal Constituency (Note: Comprising the local government areas of Ezza North and Ishielu.)	TBD	%	TBD	%	TBD	%	TBD	%	TBD
Ezza South/Ikwo Federal Constituency (Note: Comprising the local government areas of Ezza South and Ikwo.)	TBD	%	TBD	%	TBD	%	TBD	%	TBD
Ivo/Ohaozara/Onicha Federal Constituency (Note: Comprising the local government areas of Ivo, Ohaozara, and Onicha.)	TBD	%	TBD	%	TBD	%	TBD	%	TBD
Totals	TBD	%	TBD	%	TBD	%	TBD	%	TBD

==== By local government area ====
The results of the election by local government area.

LGA	Francis Nwifuru APC		Bernard Odoh APGA		Ifeanyi Odii PDP		Others		Total Valid Votes	Turnout Percentage
LGA	Votes	Percentage	Votes	Percentage	Votes	Percentage	Votes	Percentage	Total Valid Votes	Turnout Percentage
Abakaliki	TBD	%	TBD	%	TBD	%	TBD	%	TBD	%
Afikpo North	TBD	%	TBD	%	TBD	%	TBD	%	TBD	%
Afikpo South	TBD	%	TBD	%	TBD	%	TBD	%	TBD	%
Ebonyi	TBD	%	TBD	%	TBD	%	TBD	%	TBD	%
Ezza North	TBD	%	TBD	%	TBD	%	TBD	%	TBD	%
Ezza South	TBD	%	TBD	%	TBD	%	TBD	%	TBD	%
Ikwo	TBD	%	TBD	%	TBD	%	TBD	%	TBD	%
Ishielu	TBD	%	TBD	%	TBD	%	TBD	%	TBD	%
Ivo	TBD	%	TBD	%	TBD	%	TBD	%	TBD	%
Izzi	TBD	%	TBD	%	TBD	%	TBD	%	TBD	%
Ohaozara	TBD	%	TBD	%	TBD	%	TBD	%	TBD	%
Ohaukwu	TBD	%	TBD	%	TBD	%	TBD	%	TBD	%
Onicha	TBD	%	TBD	%	TBD	%	TBD	%	TBD	%
Totals	TBD	%	TBD	%	TBD	%	TBD	%	TBD	%

== See also ==
- 2023 Nigerian elections
- 2023 Nigerian gubernatorial elections
