= 2019 Ebonyi State gubernatorial election =

2019 gubernatorial election in Ebonyi State, Nigeria

- March 9, 2019
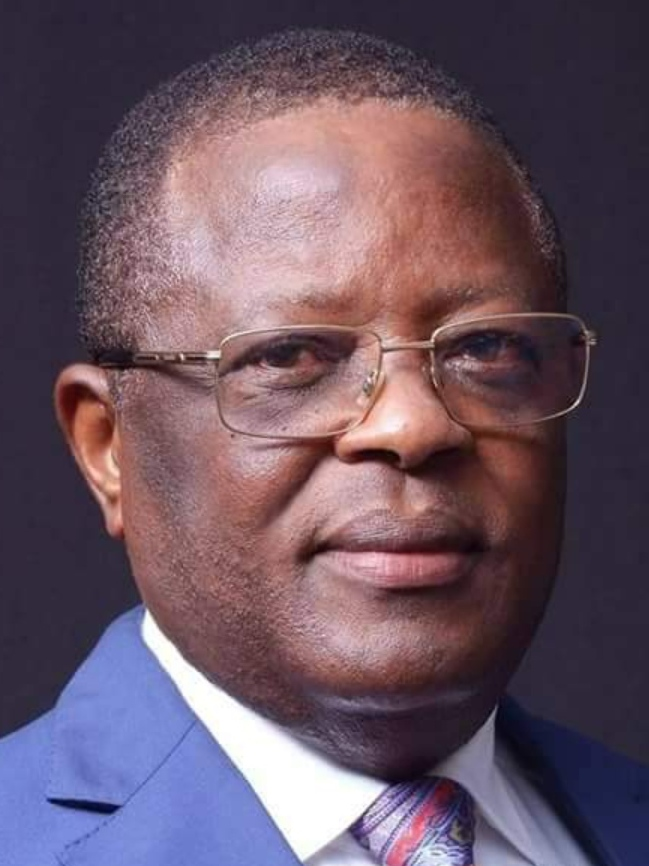

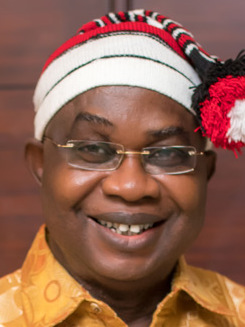
Nominee	Dave Umahi	Sonni Ogbuoji
Party	PDP	APC
Running mate	Eric Kelechi Igwe	Bernard Odoh
Popular vote	393,043	81,703
Percentage	81.54%	16.95%
Governor before election
Dave Umahi
PDP
Elected Governor
Dave Umahi
PDP

The 2019 Ebonyi State gubernatorial election occurred on March 9, 2019. Incumbent PDP Governor Dave Umahi won re-election for a second term, defeating APC Sonni Ogbuoji and several minor party candidates.

Dave Umahi emerged PDP gubernatorial candidate unopposed. He picked Eric Kelechi Igwe as his running mate. Sonni Ogbuoji was the APC candidate with Justin Mbam Ogodo as his running mate. 37 candidates contested in the election.

== Electoral system ==
The Governor of Ebonyi State is elected using the plurality voting system.

== Primary election ==
=== PDP primary ===
The PDP primary election was held on September 30, 2018.

=== Candidates ===
- Party nominee: Dave Umahi: incumbent governor
- Running mate: Eric Kelechi Igwe: incumbent deputy governor

=== APC primary ===
The APC primary election was held on September 30, 2018. Sonni Ogbuoji won the primary election polling 785 votes against 8 other candidates. His closest rival was Bernard Odoh, the immediate past secretary to the state government of Ebonyi, who came second with 519 votes. Edward Nkwegu came third with 395 votes.

=== Candidates ===
- Party nominee: Sonni Ogbuoji: Nigerian senator
- Running mate: Justin Mbam Ogodo
- Bernard Odoh: Immediate past secretary to the state government of Ebonyi
- Edward Nkwegu
- Ogbonnaya Obasi
- Austine Edeeze
- Paul Okorie
- Emmanuel Agboti
- Kelechi Chima
- Christian Chukwu

== Results ==
A total number of 37 candidates registered with the Independent National Electoral Commission to contest in the election.

The total number of registered voters in the state was 1,432,528, while 497,291 voters were accredited. Total number of votes cast was 493,002, while number of valid votes was 482,018. Rejected votes were 10,984.

Candidate	Party	Votes	%
Dave Umahi	People's Democratic Party	393,043	81.54
Sonni Ogbuoji	All Progressives Congress	81,703	16.95
Other candidates		7,272	1.51
Total		482,018	100.00
Valid votes		482,018	97.77
Invalid/blank votes		10,984	2.23
Total votes		493,002	100.00
Registered voters/turnout		1,432,528	34.41
Source: Independent Newspapers Nigeria

=== By local government area ===
Here are the results of the election by local government area for the two major parties. The total valid votes of 482,018 represents the 37 political parties that participated in the election. Green represents LGAs won by Dave Umahi. Blue represents LGAs won by Sonni Ogbuoji.

LGA	Dave Umahi PDP		Sonni Ogbuoji APC		Total votes
LGA	#	%	#	%	#
Onicha	52,851		2,497		
Ohaozara	48,256		1,004		
Ikwo	37,947		11,475		
Izzi	34,199		13,430		
Ohaukwu	30,606		9,943		
Afikpo South	27,720		9,275		
Ezza South	27,583		3,245		
Ishielu	26,700		3,105		
Abakaliki	26,809		9,815		
Ebonyi	25,830		5,951		
Afikpo North	21,245		7,446		
Ivo	19,166		2,055		
Ezza North	14,181		2,482		
Totals	393,043		81,703		482,018
