= Ohaozara people =

Subgroup of Igbo people in Nigeria

Ohaozara, is a place in Igboland in the present day of Ebonyi State, Nigeria. Ohaozara is made up of six towns:Okposi, Uburu, and Ugwulangwu. Ohaozara is inhabited by Ohaozara people who are a subgroup of Igbo people and speak Ohaozara dialects of Igbo language. Ohaozara people are the people of Ugwulangu-Ezeokechima, Okposi-Ezinasato, and Uburu-Adunsiegbe.

== History ==
Before the migration of the six towns of Ohaozara, the land was a wilderness with much dessert and less trees. The 1700-1800 AD saw the migrations of the six towns starting from Oshiri down to Ugwulangwu from different existing and ancestral clans within igboland. The origin of the name OHAOZARA, although was not formed in a day, but the early settlers often refer to the place as OHA OZARA (meaning LAND OF DESERT) and that is how the name was coined. OHAOZARA is also called OHAOZARA OBODOISII (meaning OHAOZARA OF SIX TOWNS) because of the six towns that make up of Ohaozara.

During the settlement, each of the towns fought with their neighbors which made Onicha to have fought with all remaining five towns due to being surrounded by the rest of the Ohaozara towns, with some of the fights lingering to early 1900 AD. In late 1900s/early 1910s, during the British colonization, the colonial masters changed the spelling of so many places to sound English like Oka to Awka, Okunano to Awkwunanaw, Okuzu to Awkuzu and OHAOZARA to AWHAWZARA (But Ohaozara with little few other places never adapted the spelling while majority of the places adapted it).

== Culture and natural resources ==
Although the six towns of Ohaozara are independent in the terms of Traditions but share the same Culture. In Ohaozara a lot of festivals and traditional ceremonies are celebrated in the land including Iri ji, Aju (often celebrated within August to early September annually with the land) and other cultural and traditional events which are held and celebrated as well.

Ohaozara is blessed with Salt among other natural resources, history has it that the salt of Ohaozara played a supporting role during the Biafra War, the salk lakes of Ohaozara are located in Uburu and also in Okposi. The salt in Ohaozara earned Ebonyi state the slogan- Salt of the Nation.

== Geography ==
Ohaozara is located in the Northeast of Igboland with approximately 673km^{2}. Ohaozara land is boarded by igbo clans as follows; Ezza land in the North and East, Edda land, Ehugbo (Afikpo) land, Akaeze town in the South, Awgu land in the Southwest and Nkanu land in the Northwest.

Within Ohaozara land, Isu occupies North and Northwest, Oshiri occupies Northeast, Ugwulangwu occupies Southeast, Okposi occupies South, Uburu occupies Southwest and Onicha occupies Central.

== Administration and government ==
In the precolonial period, Ohaozara like other clans in Igboland, had no king but relies on Dibia who would give orders and directives as the gods lead, and in later times had Okpara, Di, Okenwa, etc. until the British colonizations where Warrant Chief was introduced and later kingship. Warrant Chief in Ohaozara towns were all reporting to the British in the Provincial Parliament in Afikpo in early 19th century, therefore in which after the era Kingship was introduced around igboland. The new kingship method saw the reigns of HRH EZE UDE UMANTA (Ezeoha 1 of Isu-Okoma, Abutu 1 of Ohaozara Obodoisii), HRH EZE DAVID ABBA ONU (Eze Adu 1 Uburu-Adunsiegbe) among other 1st kings in Ohaozara. Today Ohaozara has a total of 13 autonomous communities where each has its own king.

During the creation of Imo state In 1976, the name "Ohaozara" was politically adapted to be a local government's name. Old Ohaozara LGA covered the six towns with three towns of Ezza (Ukawu, Ishinkwo and Aba-Omege) and two distinct towns (Akaeze and Ishagu). All these towns stayed under the LGA until 1991 during the creation of Abia state, Onicha LGA was created for (Ukawu, Aba-Omege, Isu, Oshiri, Onicha-Igboeze and Ishinkwo), again while creating Ebonyi state, Ivo LGA for (Ishagu and Akaeze) was also created. Until today three towns (Ugwulangwu, Okposi and Uburu) still remain under the New Ohaozara LGA.

Obiozara has been the administrative capital of Ohaozara LGA since when the capital was moved from ENUAKWA (COURT AREA) OKPOSI in which the change brought a political crisis between Aja Nwachukwu of Okposi and Aja Eze of Uburu. Obiozara was carved out from some parts of Onicha, some parts of Okposi and some parts of Uburu. Due to proximity habitation from the part of Uburu and non-proximity habitation from the parts Okposi and Onicha, it now seems as if Obiozara is fully part of Uburu but, rather it is all part of the 3 above named towns.

== Towns and villages ==
=== Isu ===
- Agbagbo
- Amanator
- Isu Achara
- Mgbaneze
- Mgbalukwu
- Obeagu
- Umuniko

=== Uburu ===
- Ihenu
- Umuchima
- Umuobuna
- Umuaneketa
- Amegu
- Urobo
- Uhuaba
- Ogwu
- Umunaga
- Mgbom
- Umuodigbo
- Umuanum
- Amenu
- Umuagwuoke

=== Okposi ===
- Amechi (Amenu)
- Mebiokpa
- umuakuma
- Umuka
- Mgbom
- Mebiowa
- Avu Umuiwa
- Okposi Echara
- Okwu

=== Ugwulangu ===
- Amata
- Amene
- Amenu
- Ufuovoke
- Amegu mgbom
- Umuigboke
- Ohaechara
- Ufuezerako
- Amandim
- Amaokpara
- Amankalu
- lyiazu
- Owom
- Mboji
- Amaocha
- Amaegu
- Agbabi
- Umuorie
- Umuimam
- Umumboke
- Umuefia
- Umumgbala
- Isieke
- Isinkwo
- Ufuezeofu

=== Onicha ===
- Anike
- Ezekporoke
- Enuagu
- Amutu
- Okpoma
- Uvu
- Akanu
- Eziga
- Umubo
- Anwanator
- Amata
- Isiama
- Anwakporo
- Umudomi

== Notable people ==
- Patoranking, musician from Onicha-Igboeze Ohaozara
- David Umahi, politician from Uburu Ohaozara
- Ifeanyi Odii, business mogul and politician from Isu Ohaozara
- Crayon, Singer from Onicha-Igboeze Ohaozara
- Ogbonnaya Onu, politician from Uburu Ohaozara
