= Benard Odoh =

Nigerian politician and academic

Vice Chancellor of Nnamdi Azikiwe University
- In office October 29, 2024 – November 20, 2024
- Preceded by: Charles Esimone

Secretary to Ebonyi State Government
- In office 2015–2018
- Appointed by: Dave Umahi

Personal details
- Born: 5 August 1975 (age 51) Ondo town, Ondo State
- Spouse: Dr. Juliana Nkechi Odoh
- Occupation: Politician, Academic

Benard Ifeanyi Odoh (born 5 August 1975) is a Nigerian politician and professor of applied geophysics who served as the vice-chancellor of Nnamdi Azikiwe University, Awka, Anambra State, for 22 days (29 October - 20 November 2024). He was the Secretary to the Ebonyi State Government from 2015 to 2018. He also was the gubernatorial nominee of the All Progressives Grand Alliance in Ebonyi State in 2023.

== Education and career ==
Odoh started his early primary school at Ezza Road Primary School and thereafter obtained his SSCE from Special Science School, Igbeagu Abakaliki, Ebonyi State, in 1994. He proceeded to obtain a B.Sc. in Geological Sciences(1999), MSc in Applied Geophysics,(2006), and a PhD (2008) in Applied Geophysics (Geoelectrical Geophysics) all from Nnamdi Azikiwe University, Awka. Odoh joined the academia in 2002 and was appointed a professor of Applied Geophysics in the year 2014 Nnamdi Azikiwe University, Awka. He also lectured at Ebonyi State University, Abakaliki from March 2002 – September 2009, Nnamdi Azikiwe University, Awka between September 2009 to August 2014, and was a researcher with the Society of Exploration Geophysics (SEG) at Oklahoma USA, 2006, 2007, 2008 and 2011. His research in this area provided economic decision-making tools towards reducing failures: in groundwater exploitation; solid mineral exploitation; reservoir characterization and prospect mapping for World Bank Community Water Projects, Anambra Imo River Basin. He is a member of the Society of Exploration Geophysics, Oklahoma, USA, American Association of Petroleum Geologists, USA, European Association of Geoscientists & Engineers, London, and Nigeria Association of Petroleum Explorations, Lagos. He is also a member of the Nigerian Mining and Geosciences Society, Abuja.

== Political career ==
Odoh began his political career when he contested for the Ebonyi Central senatorial position on the platform of the All Progressives Grand Alliance (APGA) in the 2015 Nigerian general elections but lost to Senator Obinna Ogba of the People's Democratic Party(PDP). He was appointed the Secretary to the State Government of Ebonyi State in May 2015 by the Governor of Ebonyi State, Dave Umahi. He resigned from the Executive Council In April 2018 for reasons of maladministration by Governor Dave Umahi. He subsequently contested for the 2019 Ebonyi Governorship election under the All Progressives Congress but lost in the primaries to Sonni Ogbuoji .

In 2022, Odoh defected from the All Progressives Congress back to the All Progressives Grand Alliance and subsequently won the gubernatorial ticket to become the nominee for the All Progressives Grand Alliance in the 2023 Ebonyi State gubernatorial election.

== Appointments and public positions held ==
- Odoh was appointed Secretary to Ebonyi State Government between May 2015 and April 2018
- Chairman CBN Anchor-Borrowers Program to boost rice production in Nigeria, 2016
- Visiting Professor to Federal University Gusau, July 2014.

=== Projects ===
Odoh was awarded the Tertiary Educational Trust Fund 2012 research grant for investigating the geological and geochemical origin of Okposi-Uburu Salt Lakes; geotechnical investigation for characterizing subsurface geology, Ebonyi State, Nigeria. He was also awarded the Society of Exploration Geophysics (SEG) Oklahoma USA, 2011 grant for geoelectrical sounding and hydrogeochemical studies for delineating groundwater contamination of acid mine drainage at Okpara Mine site, Enugu, Southeastern Nigeria, and Society of Exploration Geophysics/TGS Field Camp Project Grant in support of the project "Investigation of Toxic Waste Sites and Buried Fuel Tanks Using Spontaneous Potential Method" 2009. Other projects headed by Odoh include the Society of Exploration Geophysics Projectin support of Pb-Zn Exploration in Abakaliki using Spontaneous Potential, 2008 and Society of Exploration Geophysics Project on Hydrogeophysical mapping of the Abakaliki shale aquifers, 2007.

== Controversy ==
The claim of his professorship became a contentious issue when he was first appointed Vice-Chancellor of UNIZIK. In his curriculum vitae, he stated that he had been promoted to full professor in 2015 by the Federal University Gusau (FUGUS), Zamfara State. However, FUGUS authorities on 21 November 2024 issued a statement disowning the claim, asserting that he had never served as a professor at the institution.
