= Valentine Okike =

Nigerian politician

Deputy Speaker of the Ebonyi State House of Assembly
- In office 2011–2013
- Constituency: Onicha West

Personal details
- Occupation: Politician

Valentine Okike is a Nigerian politician who served as the Deputy Speaker of the Ebonyi State House of Assembly, representing the Onicha West Constituency of Ebonyi state.

== See also ==
- 2011 Ebonyi State House of Assembly election
- 2015 Ebonyi State House of Assembly election
