= Stanley Lebechi Mbam =

Nigerian civil engineer and politician

Commissioner for Works, Ebonyi State
- Incumbent
- Assumed office 2023
- Governor: Francis Nwifuru

Personal details
- Born: Nkaleke Unuphu, Abakaliki Local Government Area, Ebonyi State, Nigeria
- Party: All Progressives Congress (APC)
- Education: Enugu State University of Science and Technology
- Occupation: Civil engineer, politician
- Profession: Civil engineering

Stanley Lebechi Mbam is a Nigerian civil engineer and politician serving as the Commissioner for Works in Ebonyi State, in the cabinet of Governor Francis Nwifuru. He previously held appointments in the administration of former governor Dave Umahi and is a member of the All Progressives Congress (APC).

== Early life and education ==
Mbam is a native of the Nkaleke Unuphu community in Abakaliki Local Government Area of Ebonyi State. He attended Nkaliiki Primary School, which he has described as his alma mater.

He studied civil engineering, earning a Bachelor of Engineering degree from the Enugu State University of Science and Technology (ESUT). He is a registered member of the Council for the Regulation of Engineering in Nigeria (COREN) and a corporate member of the Nigerian Society of Engineers (NSE). He also holds fellowships including Fellow of the Nigerian Association of Technologists in Engineering (FNATE) and Fellow of the Institute of Policy Management Development (FIPMD).

== Career ==
=== Engineering career ===
After graduating, Mbam practised privately as a civil engineer and worked with a number of private firms. During the administration of former governor Dave Umahi, he served as General Manager of the Ebonyi North Construction Company.

=== Political career ===
Mbam served as a Special Assistant on Projects (also described as Special Assistant on Works) in a previous state administration before his appointment as commissioner.

Following the inauguration of Governor Francis Nwifuru in 2023, Mbam was appointed Commissioner for Works (at times referred to as Commissioner for Works and Transport). In that role he has overseen road and infrastructure projects across the state and, on the transport side, the affairs of the Ebonyi Transport Company (EBOTRANS).

== Philanthropy ==
Mbam runs the Mbam Stanley Lebechi (MSL) Foundation, through which he carries out community and welfare initiatives. In January 2025, the foundation launched a scholarship scheme under which 30 indigent undergraduates each received a cheque of ₦120,000. He has also funded community projects including the installation of a 300 KVA transformer and the distribution of empowerment packages and motorcycles to community security operatives in his home community.

== Suspension and reinstatement ==
In late February 2026, Governor Nwifuru suspended Mbam, together with the Commissioner for Infrastructure Development for Concession, Ogbonnaya Obasi Abara, over alleged "dereliction of duties", directing them to hand over all government property in their possession. The suspension was lifted in May 2026, returning both officials to their posts.

== Political ambitions ==
Ahead of the 2027 general elections, Mbam emerged as an aspirant for the Abakaliki/Izzi Federal Constituency seat in the House of Representatives on the platform of the APC. In April 2026, the Coalition of South-East Youth Leaders (COSEYL) publicly endorsed his aspiration.
