= Knorr Taste Quest =

Nigerian TV cooking show

- Genre: Cooking show
- Created by: Unilever Nigeria
- Directed by: Gregory Odutayo
- Starring: Dr Robert & Chef Fregz
- Opening theme: “Toss it” by Yemi Alade
- Country of origin: Nigeria
- Original language: English
- No. of seasons: 5
- No. of episodes: 39 (list of episodes)

Production
- Running time: 60 minutes

Original release
- Release: November 2013 – present

Knorr Taste Quest is a Unilever Nigeria-sponsored TV cooking show that started airing in 2013. On the show, a panel of expert judges gives various tasks to the contestants to test their culinary prowess and creativity.

Two well-known Nigerian celebrity chefs, Dr Robert and Chef Fregz, have been the judges from the start of the show to Season 4. In the competition, the judges select the best 12 contestants to compete for 13 weeks, with one of them emerging as the winner.

== Format ==
At the start of each season, there is a ‘call to entry’ into the competition and afterwards an audition process where qualified candidates are selected to enter into the final competition which can involve delivering different tasks as allocated by the judges. The grand finale usually involves the top three contestants battling it out for the chance to emerge as the winner.

SEASONS	First Winner	Second Winner	Third Winner
Knorr Taste Quest Season 1	Lalu Surdiham	Patricia Allison	Saratu Mamman
Knorr Taste Quest Season 2	Dixon Olakunbi	Nwando Onuigbo	Olabode Akinyoola
Knorr Taste Quest Season 3	Davies Obiekea	Dapo Lambo	Onisarotu Olatunji
Knorr Taste Quest Season 4	Nahvi Ifode	Emmanuel Ehimen	Oluwaseun Akomolafe
Knorr Taste Quest Season 5	Gbolabo Adebakin	Busuyi Komolafe	Dasola Abaniwonda
Knorr Taste Quest Season 6	Coming Soon	Coming Soon	Coming Soon

== Season 1 ==
=== Contestants ===
Contestant	Hometown	Age	Occupation	Status
Lalu Surdiham	Alimosho, Lagos	37	IT analyst	Winner
Patricia Allison	Apapa, Lagos	39	Housewife	Duelist (2nd place)
Saratu Mamman	Onicha, Ebonyi	20	Law student	3rd place 7th evicted
Precious Mangane	Jos, Plateau	23	Art student	4th place
