= Oluchukwu Ezeali =

Nigerian politician

Oluchukwu Ukie Ezeali

Member of the Ebonyi State House of Assembly
- Incumbent
- Assumed office 2023
- Constituency: Afikpo North East

Personal details
- Party: All Progressives Congress
- Occupation: Politician

Oluchukwu Ukie Ezeali is a Nigerian politician. He currently serves as the State Representatives representing Afikpo North East constituency in the Ebonyi State House of Assembly.
