= Odefa Obasi Odefa =

Nigerian politician

Odefa Obasi Odefa is a Nigerian politician who served as the Deputy Speaker of the Ebonyi State House of Assembly, representing the Onicha East State Constituency.
