= Perry Prominent =

Nigerian digital content creator (born 2003)

Lazarus Destiny Chibuzor (born 6 June 2003) known professionally as Perry Prominent, is a Nigerian content creator and entrepreneur based in Port Harcourt.

== Early life and education ==
Lazarus Destiny Chibuzor was born on 6 June 2003 in Ukawu, Ebonyi State, Nigeria. He is from Onicha Local Government Area of Ebonyi State and grew up in Ondo State. He is based in Port Harcourt, Rivers State.

== Career ==
Chibuzor began his career in digital content creation in 2022.

Perry has also been involved in humanitarian activities which includes the distribution of food and clothing to people in need, financial contributions towards essential bills and participation in rural outreach programmes.

In 2024, Perry Prominent was nominated for Digital Content Creator of the Year at the African Entertainment Awards USA (AEAUSA), an awards programme recognising contributions to African entertainment and culture. In 2025, he received the Humanitarian Content Creator of the Year award at the NextWave Awards. The ceremony was held in Port Harcourt, Rivers State, Nigeria.

== Awards ==
Year	Award	Category	Result
2025	NextWave Awards	Humanitarian Content Creator of the Year	Won
2024	African Entertainment Awards USA	Digital Content Creator of the Year	Nominated
