= Executive Council of Ebonyi State =

The Ebonyi State Executive Council (also known as the Cabinet of Ebonyi State) is the highest formal governmental body that plays important roles in the Government of Ebonyi State headed by the Governor of Ebonyi State. It consists of the Governor, Deputy Governor, Secretary to the State Government, Chief of Staff, Commissioners who preside over ministerial departments, and the Governor's special aides.

== Functions ==
The Executive Council exists to advise and direct the Governor. Their appointment as members of the Executive Council gives them the authority to execute power over their fields.

== Current cabinet ==
The current Executive Council is serving under the Dave Umahi administration which was elected as the 5th Governor of Ebonyi State on April 11, 2015.

Office	Incumbent
Governor	Francis Nwifuru
Deputy Governor	Patricia Obila
Secretary to the State Government	Prof. Mrs Grace Umezurike
Head of Service	Dr Rita-Mary Okoro
Chief of Staff	Prof. Emmanuel Echiegu
Deputy Chief of Staff	Timothy Nwachi
Principal Secretary	Mathias Adum
Deputy Principal Secretary	Okey Oroke
Personal Assistant to the Governor	Onu Silas Emeka
Personal Assistant to the Deputy Governor	Sunday Nwankwo
Commissioner for Justice and Attorney General of the State	A. N. Nwankwagu
Commissioner for Agriculture and Natural Resources	Uchenna Orji
Commissioner for Border Peace and Conflict Resolution	Obinna Nwachukwu
Commissioner for Commerce and Industry	Elizabeth Ogbaga
Commissioner for Culture and Tourism	Euphemia Nwali
Commissioner for Economic Empowerment and Job Creation	Sabinus Nwankwegu
Commissioner for Education	J. U. Eke
Commissioner for Environment	Moses Ogodoali Nomeh
Commissioner for Finance and Economic Development	Denis Ekumankama
Commissioner for Health	Daniel Umezurike
Commissioner for Information and State Orientation	Emma Onwe
Commissioner for Lands, Survey and Housing	Sunday Inyima
Commissioner for Local Government	Sam Okoronkwo
Commissioner for Power	Emma N. Uguru
Commissioner for Solid Mineral Development Communities	Jonah O. Egba
Commissioner for Water Resources	Francis Udu Orji
Commissioner for Women Affairs and Social Development	Rebecca N. Ogbuewu
Commissioner for Works	Engr. Stanley Lebechi Mbam
Commissioner for Youth and Sport Development	Emeka Charles Akpuanike
Senior Special Adviser - Religious and Welfare Matters	Dr. A. Nwali
Senior Special Adviser - Higher Education	Adaeze Nwuzor
Senior Special Adviser - Assembly Matters	Ogbu Anthony Ikechukwu
Senior Special Adviser - Cement/Salt	Sunday N. Ugwuocha
Senior Special Adviser - Abuja Liaison	Joseph Ekumankama
Senior Special Adviser - Legal	Uwabunkeonye Onwosi
Senior Special Adviser - Security	Ali Odefa
Special Adviser - Internal Generated Revenue	J.O.J. Oketah
Special Adviser - Petrol & Gas	Onyiba Bassey Chima
Special Adviser - Attitudinal Change	Pius Eze
Special Adviser - Market Development	Peter Oba
Special Adviser - Inter-Party Affairs	Gideon I. Onwe
Special Adviser - Labour Relations	Grace O. Chukwu
Special Adviser - Students Affairs	Martin A. Okwuegbu
Special Adviser - WCD (North)	Patricia Ogodo Ede
Special Adviser - WCD (Central)	Stephanie Chima
Special Adviser - WCD (South)	Emerald Ude Akaji
Special Adviser - DE & PM	Emma O. Ibaki
Special Adviser - Primary Health (North)	Chris E. Achi
Special Adviser - Primary Health (Central)	Obianuju G. Alo
Special Adviser - Primary Health (South)	Chikere Omabe
Special Adviser - Transport	Philip Eworo
Special Adviser - Grants/Donors	Chidiebere Ibe
Special Adviser - Rural Development	Ogbuefi Enekwachi Akpa
Special Adviser - Primary Education	Itapa Azuobu
Special Adviser - Lagos Liaison	Jacinta Nworie
Special Adviser - ICT	Aja Nwabueze Igwe
Special Adviser - SD	Onyeabor N. Ngene
