= Sylvester Ogbaga =

Nigerian politician (born 1961)

State Representative
- Constituency: Abakaliki/Izzi

Personal details
- Born: 7 July 1961 (age 65)
- Occupation: Politician

Sylvester O. Ogbaga (born 7 July 1961) is a Nigerian politician. He was a member of the Ebonyi state house of representative representing Abakaliki/Izzi state constituency under the platform of the Peoples Democratic Party. He retired at the 2023 election to run for the governorship of Ebonyi State but was eliminated in the primary.

== Early life and career ==
Sylvester O. Ogbaga was born on 7 July 1961 in Ebonyi State, Nigeria. He started his career as a teacher with the Local Government Service Commission in Abakaliki, where he worked from 1985 to 1987. From 1995 to 1998, he served as a health instructor and sports coordinator before beginning his political career.

== Political career ==
Ogbaga began his political career in 1998 when he was elected Chairman of Abakaliki Local Government Area. During his tenure, he also served as Chairman of the Ebonyi State chapter of the Association of Local Governments of Nigeria (ALGON).

He was later elected to the House of Representatives on the platform of the Peoples Democratic Party (PDP), representing the Abakaliki/Izzi Federal Constituency. He was re-elected in the 2011, 2015 and 2019 general elections and served in the 7th, 8th and 9th National Assemblies.

In the 2023 election, Ogbaga contested for the governorship of Ebonyi State but was defeated in the party's primary election.

== See also ==
- 2023 Nigerian House of Representatives election
- 2023 Ebonyi State gubernatorial election
