= Fidelis Nwankwo =

Nigerian politician

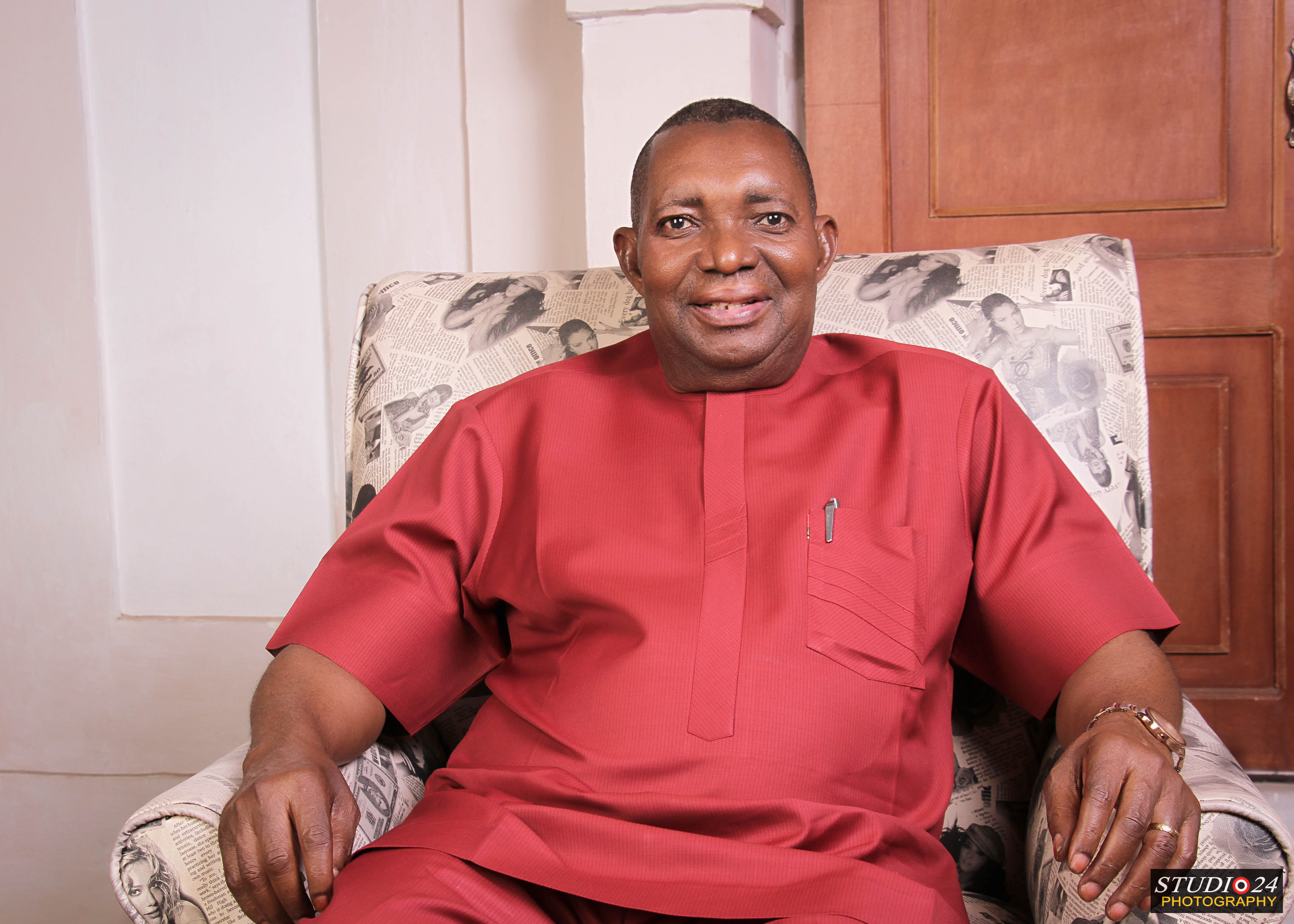

Minister of State For Health
- Appointed by: President Goodluck Jonathan

Personal details
- Occupation: Politician

Fidelis Nwankwo is a Nigerian politician who served as the Minister of State for Health during the administration of President Goodluck Jonathan. In 2022, he declared his intention to contest the 2023 Ebonyi State gubernatorial election on the platform of the Peoples Democratic Party (PDP), but was unsuccessful in the primary.
