= Chukwuma Nwazunku =

Nigerian politician

Chukwuma Nwazunku is a Nigerian politician. He was a member representing Ohaukwu/Ebonyi Federal Constituency in the House of Representatives.

== Early life and education ==
Chukwuma Nwazunku was born in 1975 and hails from Ebonyi State. He completed his secondary education in 1992 at Abakiliki High School.

== Political career ==
In 2019, he was elected as a member representing Ohaukwu/Ebonyi Federal Constituency. Ahead of the 2023 gubernatorial elections, Chukwuma picked the party form alongside his older brother, Dr. Augustine Nwazunku, both under the platform of the Peoples Democratic Party (PDP). He served as Speaker, Ebonyi State House of Assembly, and faced impeachment twice. In May 2025, he defected to the All Progressives Congress (APC).

== Award ==
- Akwamini-Eka I of Ebonyi State
