= Ifeanyi Odii =

Nigerian businessman and politician (born 1975)

Ifeanyi Chukwuma Odii
- Born: 17 April 1975 (age 51); Onicha, Ebonyi State, Nigeria
- Education: National Open University of Nigeria
- Occupations: Businessman, Philanthropist, Politician

Ifeanyi Chukwuma Odii (born 17 April 1975) is a Nigerian businessman, philanthropist and politician. He is the founder and chairman of Orient Global Group. and also the gubernatorial candidate of the People’s Democratic Party for Ebonyi State in the 2023 gubernatorial election. Odii is a native of Isu in Onicha local government area (LGA) of Ebonyi state, Nigeria.

== Early life and education ==
Odii attended Isu-achara primary school and Isu secondary school, both in Ebonyi state for his early education. Odii studied Business Administration from the National Open University of Nigeria earning a Bachelors of Science (B.Sc.). He was conferred with a Doctor of Science Degree in Strategic Business Management & Corporate Governance by the European American University in the Republic of Panama. He also studied through the Chief Executive program at Lagos Business School. He is a member of the Lagos State University Governing board announced in 2021 by the Lagos State Governor, Babajide Sanwo-Olu He is also on the board of the Nnamdi Azikwe University Business School.

== Political career ==
Odii was elected 2023 Gubernatorial candidate of the People’s Democratic Party (Nigeria) polling a total of 349 votes to defeat his closest rival, Chris Usulor, who scored nine votes.

== Awards ==
- In 2022, Guardian Newspaper recognized Odii as one of the top 50 CEOs that impacted and contributed to Nigeria’s GDP growth in 2021.
- Odii was awarded Independent Newspaper’s Philanthropist of the year.
- Odii won the “Next Bull Awards” in 2021 at the Nigerian Investors Value Awards (NIVA) organized by Business Day Newspaper and the Nigerian Stock Exchange.

== Philanthropy ==
Odii setup the Ebele and Anyichuks Foundation which he runs with his wife. The foundation has built over 130 homes for poor people, six churches and a 2.2 km (1.4 mi) road in Magodo, Lagos. During the COVID-19 pandemic, the foundation also donated 150m naira to the Federal Government of Nigeria, Lagos state government and Ebonyi state government as well as distribute pallatives to people. He has also provided scholarships for students in Ebonyi state

== See also ==
- List of people from Ebonyi State
