= 2015 Ebonyi State House of Assembly election =

The 2015 Ebonyi State House of Assembly election was held on April 11, 2015, to elect members of the Ebonyi State House of Assembly in Nigeria. All the 24 seats were up for election in the Ebonyi State House of Assembly.

== Results ==
=== Izzi West ===
PDP candidate Francis Ogbonnaya Nwifuru won the election.

2015 Ebonyi State House of Assembly election
Party	Candidate	Votes	%
PDP	Francis Ogbonnaya Nwifuru		
PDP hold			

=== Onicha East ===
PDP candidate Odefa Obasi Odefa won the election.

2015 Ebonyi State House of Assembly election
Party	Candidate	Votes	%
PDP	Odefa Obasi Odefa		
PDP hold			

=== Ezza North West ===
PDP candidate Victor Nwite won the election.

2015 Ebonyi State House of Assembly election
Party	Candidate	Votes	%
PDP	Victor Nwite		
PDP hold			

=== Afikpo North West ===
PDP candidate Ikoro Kingsley Ogbonnaya won the election.

2015 Ebonyi State House of Assembly election
Party	Candidate	Votes	%
PDP	Ikoro Kingsley Ogbonnaya		
PDP hold			

=== Ebonyi North West ===
PDP candidate Aleke Victor Umoke won the election.

2015 Ebonyi State House of Assembly election
Party	Candidate	Votes	%
PDP	Aleke Victor Umoke		
PDP hold			

=== Ezza South ===
PDP candidate Chris Ususlor won the election.

2015 Ebonyi State House of Assembly election
Party	Candidate	Votes	%
PDP	Chris Ususlor		
PDP hold			

=== Ohaozara West ===
PDP candidate Onu Nwonye won the election.

2015 Ebonyi State House of Assembly election
Party	Candidate	Votes	%
PDP	Onu Nwonye		
PDP hold			

=== Ezza North East ===
PDP candidate Nwobashi Joseph won the election.

2015 Ebonyi State House of Assembly election
Party	Candidate	Votes	%
PDP	Nwaobashi Joseph		
PDP hold			

=== Afikpo South West ===
PDP candidate Nkemka Okoro Onuma won the election.

2015 Ebonyi State House of Assembly election
Party	Candidate	Votes	%
PDP	Nkemka Okoro Onuma		
PDP hold			

=== Izzi East ===
LP candidate Anthony Nwegede won the election.

2015 Ebonyi State House of Assembly election
Party	Candidate	Votes	%
LP	Anthony Nwegede		
LP hold			

=== Abakaliki North ===
PDP candidate Okpo Franca Chinyere won the election.

2015 Ebonyi State House of Assembly election
Party	Candidate	Votes	%
PDP	Okpo Franca Chinyere		
PDP hold			

=== Ikwo North ===
PDP candidate Nwuruku Humphrey Alieze won the election.

2015 Ebonyi State House of Assembly election
Party	Candidate	Votes	%
PDP	Nwuruku Humphrey Alieze		
PDP hold			

=== Ohaukwu South ===
PDP candidate Oselebe Ebiaga Christian won the election.

2015 Ebonyi State House of Assembly election
Party	Candidate	Votes	%
PDP	Oselebe Ebiaga Christian		
PDP hold			

=== Ebonyi North East ===
PDP candidate Ezeoma Benjamin won the election.

2015 Ebonyi State House of Assembly election
Party	Candidate	Votes	%
PDP	Ezeoma Benjamin		
PDP hold			

=== Afikpo South East ===
PDP candidate Chidi Ejem won the election.

2015 Ebonyi State House of Assembly election
Party	Candidate	Votes	%
PDP	Chidi Ejem		
PDP hold			

=== Ikwo South ===
PDP candidate Ogiji Imo Chike won the election.

2015 Ebonyi State House of Assembly election
Party	Candidate	Votes	%
PDP	Ogiji Imo Chike		
PDP hold			

=== Ishielu South ===
PDP candidate Julius Ifeanyi Nwokpo won the election.

2015 Ebonyi State House of Assembly election
Party	Candidate	Votes	%
PDP	Julius Ifeanyi Nwokpo		
PDP hold			

=== Ivo ===
PDP candidate Oliver Osi won the election.

2015 Ebonyi State House of Assembly election
Party	Candidate	Votes	%
PDP	Oliver Osi		
PDP hold			

=== Ohaozara East ===
PDP candidate Ude Augusta Chika won the election.

2015 Ebonyi State House of Assembly election
Party	Candidate	Votes	%
PDP	Ude Augusta Chika		
PDP hold			

=== Ohaukwu North ===
PDP candidate Frank Nwaka Onwe won the election.

2015 Ebonyi State House of Assembly election
Party	Candidate	Votes	%
PDP	Frank Nwaka Onwe		
PDP hold			

=== Onicha West ===
PDP candidate Valentine Okike Uzo won the election.

2015 Ebonyi State House of Assembly election
Party	Candidate	Votes	%
PDP	Valentine Okike Uzo		
PDP hold			

=== Abakaliki South ===
PDP candidate Luke Nkwegu won the election.

2015 Ebonyi State House of Assembly election
Party	Candidate	Votes	%
PDP	Luke Nkwegu		
PDP hold			

=== Ishielu North ===
PDP candidate Ali Okechukwu won the election.

2015 Ebonyi State House of Assembly election
Party	Candidate	Votes	%
PDP	Ali Okechukwu		
PDP hold			

=== Afikpo North East ===
PPA candidate Maria Ude Nwachi won the election.

2015 Ebonyi State House of Assembly election
Party	Candidate	Votes	%
PPA	Maria Ude Nwachi		
PPA hold			
