= 2007 Ebonyi State House of Assembly election =

The 2007 Ebonyi State House of Assembly election was held on April 14, 2015, to elect members of the Ebonyi State House of Assembly in Nigeria. All 24 seats were up for election.

== Results ==
=== Izzi West ===
PDP candidate Augustine Nwankwegu won the election.

2007 Ebonyi State House of Assembly election
Party	Candidate	Votes	%
PDP	Augustine Nwankwegu		
PDP hold			

=== Onicha East ===
PDP candidate Odefa Obasi Odefa won the election.

2007 Ebonyi State House of Assembly election
Party	Candidate	Votes	%
PDP	Odefa Obasi Odefa		
PDP hold			

=== Ezza North West ===
PDP candidate Emmanuel Nwobo won the election.

2007 Ebonyi State House of Assembly election
Party	Candidate	Votes	%
PDP	Emmanuel Nwobo		
PDP hold			

=== Afikpo North West ===
PDP candidate Sylvester Oko Omeri won the election.

2007 Ebonyi State House of Assembly election
Party	Candidate	Votes	%
PDP	Sylvester Oko Omeri		
PDP hold			

=== Ebonyi North West ===
PDP candidate Ikechukwu Nwankwo won the election.

2007 Ebonyi State House of Assembly election
Party	Candidate	Votes	%
PDP	Ikechukwu Nwankwo		
PDP hold			

=== Ezza South ===
PDP candidate Aleke Emmanuel won the election.

2007 Ebonyi State House of Assembly election
Party	Candidate	Votes	%
PDP	Aleke Emmanuel		
PDP hold			

=== Ohaozara West ===
PDP candidate Aja Samuel Onu won the election.

2007 Ebonyi State House of Assembly election
Party	Candidate	Votes	%
PDP	Aja Samuel Onu		
PDP hold			

=== Ezza North East ===
PDP candidate Patrick Mgbebu Nworu won the election.

2007 Ebonyi State House of Assembly election
Party	Candidate	Votes	%
PDP	Patrick Mgbebu Nworu		
PDP hold			

=== Afikpo South West ===
PDP candidate Uduma Chima Eni won the election.

2007 Ebonyi State House of Assembly election
Party	Candidate	Votes	%
PDP	Uduma Chima Eni		
PDP hold			

=== Izzi East ===
PDP candidate Richard Idike Ugo won the election.

2007 Ebonyi State House of Assembly election
Party	Candidate	Votes	%
PDP	Richard Idike Ugo		
PDP hold			

=== Abakaliki North ===
PDP candidate Jude A.P. Okolo won the election.

2007 Ebonyi State House of Assembly election
Party	Candidate	Votes	%
PDP	Jude A.P. Okolo		
PDP hold			

=== Ikwo North ===
PDP candidate Nwali Samuel won the election.

2007 Ebonyi State House of Assembly election
Party	Candidate	Votes	%
PDP	Nwali Samuel		
PDP hold			

=== Ohaukwu South ===
PDP candidate Kennedy Ogba won the election.

2007 Ebonyi State House of Assembly election
Party	Candidate	Votes	%
PDP	Kennedy Ogba		
PDP hold			

=== Ebonyi North East ===
PDP candidate Bede Johnson Nwali won the election.

2007 Ebonyi State House of Assembly election
Party	Candidate	Votes	%
PDP	Bede Johnson Nwali		
PDP hold			

=== Afikpo South East ===
PDP candidate Dorothy Ogonnaya Obasi won the election.

2007 Ebonyi State House of Assembly election
Party	Candidate	Votes	%
PDP	Dorothy Ogonnaya Obasi		
PDP hold			

=== Ikwo South ===
PDP candidate Ogiji Imo Chike won the election.

2007 Ebonyi State House of Assembly election
Party	Candidate	Votes	%
PDP	Ogiji Imo Chike		
PDP hold			

=== Ishielu South ===
PDP candidate Gabriel Ede Ebenyi won the election.

2007 Ebonyi State House of Assembly election
Party	Candidate	Votes	%
PDP	Gabriel Ede Ebenyi		
PDP hold			

=== Ivo ===
PDP candidate Orji Uchenna Orji won the election.

2007 Ebonyi State House of Assembly election
Party	Candidate	Votes	%
PDP	Orji Uchenna Orji		
PDP hold			

=== Ohaozara East ===
PDP candidate Nwogu Iheanacho won the election.

2007 Ebonyi State House of Assembly election
Party	Candidate	Votes	%
PDP	Nwogu Iheanacho		
PDP hold			

=== Ohaukwu North ===
PDP candidate Vincent Awoke Ome won the election.

2007 Ebonyi State House of Assembly election
Party	Candidate	Votes	%
PDP	Vincent Awoke Ome		
PDP hold			

=== Onicha West ===
PDP candidate Mike Anoke Ude Umanta won the election.

2007 Ebonyi State House of Assembly election
Party	Candidate	Votes	%
PDP	Mike Anoke Ude Umanta		
PDP hold			

=== Abakaliki South ===
PDP candidate Helen Nwabosi won the election.

2007 Ebonyi State House of Assembly election
Party	Candidate	Votes	%
PDP	Helen Nwabosi		
PDP hold			

=== Ishielu North ===
PDP candidate Nwachukwu Johnson won the election.

2007 Ebonyi State House of Assembly election
Party	Candidate	Votes	%
PDP	Nwachukwu Johnson		
PDP hold			

=== Afikpo North East ===
PDP candidate Ben Ndubuisi Isu won the election.

2007 Ebonyi State House of Assembly election
Party	Candidate	Votes	%
PDP	Ben Ndubuisi Isu		
PDP hold			
