= 2011 Ebonyi State House of Assembly election =

The 2011 Ebonyi State House of Assembly election was held on April 26, 2011, to elect members of the Ebonyi State House of Assembly in Nigeria. All the 24 seats were up for election in the Ebonyi State House of Assembly.

== Results ==
=== Izzi West ===
PDP candidate Nwifuru Francis Ogbonna won the election.

2011 Ebonyi State House of Assembly election
Party	Candidate	Votes	%
PDP	Nwifuru Francis Ogbonna		
PDP hold			

=== Onicha East ===
PDP candidate Odefa Obasi Odefa won the election.

2011 Ebonyi State House of Assembly election
Party	Candidate	Votes	%
PDP	Odefa Obasi Odefa		
PDP hold			

=== Ezza North West ===
ANPP candidate Enyi O. Chukwuma won the election.

2011 Ebonyi State House of Assembly election
Party	Candidate	Votes	%
ANPP	Enyi O. Chukwuma		
ANPP hold			

=== Afikpo North West ===
PDP candidate Ikoro Ogbonna Kingsley won the election.

2011 Ebonyi State House of Assembly election
Party	Candidate	Votes	%
PDP	Ikoro Ogbonna Kingsley		
PDP hold			

=== Ebonyi North West ===
PDP candidate Ikechukwu Nwankwo won the election.

2011 Ebonyi State House of Assembly election
Party	Candidate	Votes	%
PDP	Ikechukwu Nwankwo		
PDP hold			

=== Ezza South ===
PDP candidate Usulor Christian won the election.

2011 Ebonyi State House of Assembly election
Party	Candidate	Votes	%
PDP	Usulor Christian		
PDP hold			

=== Ohaozara West ===
PDP candidate Jerry Obasi won the election.

2011 Ebonyi State House of Assembly election
Party	Candidate	Votes	%
PDP	Jerry Obasi		
PDP hold			

=== Ezza North East ===
ANPP candidate Nwobashi Joseph won the election.

2011 Ebonyi State House of Assembly election
Party	Candidate	Votes	%
ANPP	Nwobashi Joseph		
ANPP hold			

=== Afikpo South West ===
PDP candidate Uduma Chima Eni won the election.

2011 Ebonyi State House of Assembly election
Party	Candidate	Votes	%
PDP	Uduma Chima Eni		
PDP hold			

=== Izzi East ===
PDP candidate Nwibo Vincent Mbam won the election.

2011 Ebonyi State House of Assembly election
Party	Candidate	Votes	%
PDP	Nwibo Vincent Mbam		
PDP hold			

=== Abakaliki North ===
PDP candidate Nwachukwu Oliver won the election.

2011 Ebonyi State House of Assembly election
Party	Candidate	Votes	%
PDP	Nwachukwu Oliver		
PDP hold			

=== Ikwo North ===
PDP candidate Nwali Samuel Nwoba won the election.

2011 Ebonyi State House of Assembly election
Party	Candidate	Votes	%
PDP	Nwali Samuel Nwoba		
PDP hold			

=== Ohaukwu South ===
PDP candidate Aleke Mabel Ozueaku won the election.

2011 Ebonyi State House of Assembly election
Party	Candidate	Votes	%
PDP	Aleke Mabel Ozueaku		
PDP hold			

=== Ebonyi North East ===
PDP candidate Nwazunku Chukwuma won the election.

2011 Ebonyi State House of Assembly election
Party	Candidate	Votes	%
PDP	Nwazunku Chukwuma		
PDP hold			

=== Afikpo South East ===
PDP candidate Oji Blaise Eze won the election.

2011 Ebonyi State House of Assembly election
Party	Candidate	Votes	%
PDP	Oji Blaise Eze		
PDP hold			

=== Ikwo South ===
PDP candidate Ogiji Imo Chike won the election.

2011 Ebonyi State House of Assembly election
Party	Candidate	Votes	%
PDP	Ogiji Imo Chike		
PDP hold			

=== Ishielu South ===
PDP candidate Julius Nwokpor won the election.

2011 Ebonyi State House of Assembly election
Party	Candidate	Votes	%
PDP	Julius Nwokpor		
PDP hold			

=== Ivo ===
PDP candidate Lillian Igwe won the election.

2011 Ebonyi State House of Assembly election
Party	Candidate	Votes	%
PDP	Lillian Igwe		
PDP hold			

=== Ohaozara East ===
PDP candidate Nnenna Nwane won the election.

2011 Ebonyi State House of Assembly election
Party	Candidate	Votes	%
PDP	Nnenna Nwane		
PDP hold			

=== Ohaukwu North ===
PDP candidate Onwe Frank Nwaka won the election.

2011 Ebonyi State House of Assembly election
Party	Candidate	Votes	%
PDP	Onwe Frank Nwaka		
PDP hold			

=== Onicha West ===
PDP candidate Valentine Okike won the election.

2011 Ebonyi State House of Assembly election
Party	Candidate	Votes	%
PDP	Valentine Okike		
PDP hold			

=== Abakaliki South ===
PDP candidate Helen Nwobasi won the election.

2011 Ebonyi State House of Assembly election
Party	Candidate	Votes	%
PDP	Helen Nwobasi		
PDP hold			

=== Ishielu North ===
PDP candidate Ogbu Anthony Ikechukwu won the election.

2011 Ebonyi State House of Assembly election
Party	Candidate	Votes	%
PDP	Ogbu Anthony Ikechukwu		
PDP hold			

=== Afikpo North East ===
PDP candidate Eloy Ogbonna won the election.

2011 Ebonyi State House of Assembly election
Party	Candidate	Votes	%
PDP	Eloy Ogbonna		
PDP hold			
