= 2003 Ebonyi State House of Assembly election =

The 2003 Ebonyi State House of Assembly election was held on May 3, 2003, to elect members of the Ebonyi State House of Assembly in Nigeria. All the 24 seats were up for election in the Ebonyi State House of Assembly.

== Results ==
=== Izzi West ===
PDP candidate Sylvester Nwankwo won the election.

2003 Ebonyi State House of Assembly election
| Party | Candidate | Votes | % |
|---|---|---|---|
| PDP | Sylvester Nwankwo | | |
| PDP hold | | | |

=== Onicha East ===
PDP candidate Patrick Edediugwu won the election.

2003 Ebonyi State House of Assembly election
| Party | Candidate | Votes | % |
|---|---|---|---|
| PDP | Patrick Edediugwu | | |
| PDP hold | | | |

=== Ezza North West ===
PDP candidate Emmanuel Nwobo won the election.

2003 Ebonyi State House of Assembly election
| Party | Candidate | Votes | % |
|---|---|---|---|
| PDP | Emmanuel Nwobo | | |
| PDP hold | | | |

=== Afikpo North West ===
PDP candidate Christopher Omo Isu won the election.

2003 Ebonyi State House of Assembly election
| Party | Candidate | Votes | % |
|---|---|---|---|
| PDP | Christopher Omo Isu | | |
| PDP hold | | | |

=== Ebonyi North West ===
PDP candidate Kenneth Ochigbo won the election.

2003 Ebonyi State House of Assembly election
| Party | Candidate | Votes | % |
|---|---|---|---|
| PDP | Kenneth Ochigbo | | |
| PDP hold | | | |

=== Ezza South ===
PDP candidate Tobias Okwuru won the election.

2003 Ebonyi State House of Assembly election
| Party | Candidate | Votes | % |
|---|---|---|---|
| PDP | Tobias Okwuru | | |
| PDP hold | | | |

=== Ohaozara West ===
PDP candidate Anthony Onu won the election.

2003 Ebonyi State House of Assembly election
| Party | Candidate | Votes | % |
|---|---|---|---|
| PDP | Anthony Onu | | |
| PDP hold | | | |

=== Ezza North East ===
PDP candidate won the election.

2003 Ebonyi State House of Assembly election
| Party | Candidate | Votes | % |
|---|---|---|---|
| PDP | | | |
| PDP hold | | | |

=== Afikpo South West ===
PDP candidate Ugorji Ama Oti won the election.

2003 Ebonyi State House of Assembly election
| Party | Candidate | Votes | % |
|---|---|---|---|
| PDP | Ugorji Ama Oti | | |
| PDP hold | | | |

=== Izzi East ===
PDP candidate Simon Iseh won the election.

2003 Ebonyi State House of Assembly election
| Party | Candidate | Votes | % |
|---|---|---|---|
| PDP | Simon Iseh | | |
| PDP hold | | | |

=== Abakaliki North ===
PDP candidate Fabian Muoneke won the election.

2003 Ebonyi State House of Assembly election
| Party | Candidate | Votes | % |
|---|---|---|---|
| PDP | Fabian Muoneke | | |
| PDP hold | | | |

=== Ikwo North ===
PDP candidate James Alaka won the election.

2003 Ebonyi State House of Assembly election
| Party | Candidate | Votes | % |
|---|---|---|---|
| PDP | James Alaka | | |
| PDP hold | | | |

=== Ohaukwu South ===
PDP candidate Onwe S. Onwe won the election.

2003 Ebonyi State House of Assembly election
| Party | Candidate | Votes | % |
|---|---|---|---|
| PDP | Onwe S. Onwe | | |
| PDP hold | | | |

=== Ebonyi North East ===
PDP candidate Sabinus Nwankwegu won the election.

2003 Ebonyi State House of Assembly election
| Party | Candidate | Votes | % |
|---|---|---|---|
| PDP | Sabinus Nwankwegu | | |
| PDP hold | | | |

=== Afikpo South East ===
PDP candidate Ben Oko Obasi won the election.

2003 Ebonyi State House of Assembly election
| Party | Candidate | Votes | % |
|---|---|---|---|
| PDP | Ben Oko Obasi | | |
| PDP hold | | | |

=== Ikwo South ===
PDP candidate Nweke Clement won the election.

2003 Ebonyi State House of Assembly election
| Party | Candidate | Votes | % |
|---|---|---|---|
| PDP | Nweke Clement | | |
| PDP hold | | | |

=== Ishielu South ===
PDP candidate Peter Ede won the election.

2003 Ebonyi State House of Assembly election
| Party | Candidate | Votes | % |
|---|---|---|---|
| PDP | Peter Ede | | |
| PDP hold | | | |

=== Ivo ===
PDP candidate Paul Ogbonnia won the election.

2003 Ebonyi State House of Assembly election
| Party | Candidate | Votes | % |
|---|---|---|---|
| PDP | Paul Ogbonnia | | |
| PDP hold | | | |

=== Ohaozara East ===
PDP candidate Sunday Chukwu won the election.

2003 Ebonyi State House of Assembly election
| Party | Candidate | Votes | % |
|---|---|---|---|
| PDP | Sunday Chukwu | | |
| PDP hold | | | |

=== Ohaukwu North ===
PDP candidate Bernard Uzim Nwankwo won the election.

2003 Ebonyi State House of Assembly election
| Party | Candidate | Votes | % |
|---|---|---|---|
| PDP | Bernard Uzim Nwankwo | | |
| PDP hold | | | |

=== Onicha West ===
PDP candidate Uzor Chigbo won the election.

2003 Ebonyi State House of Assembly election
| Party | Candidate | Votes | % |
|---|---|---|---|
| PDP | Uzor Chigbo | | |
| PDP hold | | | |

=== Abakaliki South ===
PDP candidate Fidelis Ogodo won the election.

2003 Ebonyi State House of Assembly election
| Party | Candidate | Votes | % |
|---|---|---|---|
| PDP | Fidelis Ogodo | | |
| PDP hold | | | |

=== Ishielu North ===
PDP candidate Nwachukwu Johnson won the election.

2003 Ebonyi State House of Assembly election
| Party | Candidate | Votes | % |
|---|---|---|---|
| PDP | Nwachukwu Johnson | | |
| PDP hold | | | |

=== Afikpo North East ===
PDP candidate Arinze Egwu won the election.

2003 Ebonyi State House of Assembly election
| Party | Candidate | Votes | % |
|---|---|---|---|
| PDP | Arinze Egwu | | |
| PDP hold | | | |
