= Isieke =

- town
- Location in Nigeria
- Coordinates: 6°23′N 8°04′E
- Country: Nigeria
- State: Ebonyi State
- Time zone: UTC+1 (WAT)

Isieke (or 'Isiaka) is a larger town in Ebonyi State, Nigeria. It is the headquarters of the Ivo Local Government Area.

The town has an official Post Office.
