= 1999 Ebonyi State House of Assembly election =

The 1999 Ebonyi State House of Assembly election was held on January 9, 1999, to elect members of the Ebonyi State House of Assembly in Nigeria. All the 24 seats were up for election in the Ebonyi State House of Assembly.

== Results ==
=== Izzi West ===
APP candidate Ngwuta Joseph won the election.

1999 Ebonyi State House of Assembly election
Party	Candidate	Votes	%
All People's Party (Nigeria)	Ngwuta Joseph		
All People's Party (Nigeria) hold			

=== Onicha East ===
APP candidate Patrick Ebediegwu won the election.

1999 Ebonyi State House of Assembly election
Party	Candidate	Votes	%
All People's Party (Nigeria)	Patrick Ebediegwu		
All People's Party (Nigeria) hold			

=== Ezza North West ===
PDP candidate Mgbada Samuel won the election.

1999 Ebonyi State House of Assembly election
Party	Candidate	Votes	%
PDP	Mgbada Samuel		
PDP hold			

=== Afikpo North West ===
PDP candidate Christopher Omo Isu won the election.

1999 Ebonyi State House of Assembly election
Party	Candidate	Votes	%
PDP	Christopher Omo Isu		
PDP hold			

=== Ebonyi North West ===
PDP candidate Kenneth Ochigbo won the election.

1999 Ebonyi State House of Assembly election
Party	Candidate	Votes	%
PDP	Kenneth Ochigbo		
PDP hold			

=== Ezza South ===
PDP candidate Tobias Okwuru won the election.

1999 Ebonyi State House of Assembly election
Party	Candidate	Votes	%
PDP	Tobias Okwuru		
PDP hold			

=== Ohaozara West ===
APP candidate Anoke Uwadiegwu won the election.

1999 Ebonyi State House of Assembly election
Party	Candidate	Votes	%
All People's Party (Nigeria)	Anoke Uwadiegwu		
All People's Party (Nigeria) hold			

=== Ezza North East ===
PDP candidate Joseph Nwaobasi won the election.

1999 Ebonyi State House of Assembly election
Party	Candidate	Votes	%
PDP	Joseph Nwaobasi		
PDP hold			

=== Afikpo South West ===
APP candidate Ugorji Ama Oti won the election.

1999 Ebonyi State House of Assembly election
Party	Candidate	Votes	%
All People's Party (Nigeria)	Ugorji Ama Oti		
All People's Party (Nigeria) hold			

=== Izzi East ===
PDP candidate Simon Iseh won the election.

1999 Ebonyi State House of Assembly election
Party	Candidate	Votes	%
PDP	Simon Iseh		
PDP hold			

=== Abakaliki North ===
PDP candidate Fabian Muoneke won the election.

1999 Ebonyi State House of Assembly election
Party	Candidate	Votes	%
PDP	Fabian Muoneke		
PDP hold			

=== Ikwo North ===
PDP candidate David Onuoha won the election.

1999 Ebonyi State House of Assembly election
Party	Candidate	Votes	%
PDP	David Onuoha		
PDP hold			

=== Ohaukwu South ===
PDP candidate Onwe S. Onwe won the election.

1999 Ebonyi State House of Assembly election
Party	Candidate	Votes	%
PDP	Onwe S. Onwe		
PDP hold			

=== Ebonyi North East ===
A candidate won the election.

1999 Ebonyi State House of Assembly election
Party	Candidate	Votes	%
	hold		

=== Afikpo South East ===
APP candidate Ben Obasi won the election.

1999 Ebonyi State House of Assembly election
Party	Candidate	Votes	%
All People's Party (Nigeria)	Ben Obasi		
All People's Party (Nigeria) hold			

=== Ikwo South ===
PDP candidate Festus Okoha won the election.

1999 Ebonyi State House of Assembly election
Party	Candidate	Votes	%
PDP	Festus Okoha		
PDP hold			

=== Ishielu South ===
PDP candidate Julius Ucha won the election.

1999 Ebonyi State House of Assembly election
Party	Candidate	Votes	%
PDP	Julius Ucha		
PDP hold			

=== Ivo ===
PDP candidate Ray Akanwa won the election.

1999 Ebonyi State House of Assembly election
Party	Candidate	Votes	%
PDP	Ray Akanwa		
PDP hold			

=== Ohaozara East ===
PDP candidate Sunday Chukwu won the election.

1999 Ebonyi State House of Assembly election
Party	Candidate	Votes	%
PDP	Sunday Chukwu		
PDP hold			

=== Ohaukwu North ===
PDP candidate Uzim Nwankwo won the election.

1999 Ebonyi State House of Assembly election
Party	Candidate	Votes	%
PDP	Uzim Nwankwo		
PDP hold			

=== Onicha West ===
PDP candidate Okorie Linus won the election.

1999 Ebonyi State House of Assembly election
Party	Candidate	Votes	%
PDP	Okorie Linus		
PDP hold			

=== Abakaliki South ===
AD candidate Fidelis Ogodo won the election.

1999 Ebonyi State House of Assembly election
Party	Candidate	Votes	%
AD	Fidelis Ogodo		
AD hold			

=== Ishielu North ===
PDP candidate Eze Jonathan won the election.

1999 Ebonyi State House of Assembly election
Party	Candidate	Votes	%
PDP	Eze Jonathan		
PDP hold			

=== Afikpo North East ===
APP candidate Arinze Egwu won the election.

1999 Ebonyi State House of Assembly election
Party	Candidate	Votes	%
All People's Party (Nigeria)	Arinze Egwu		
All People's Party (Nigeria) hold			
