= Nwobashi Joseph =

Nigerian politician

State Representative
- Constituency: Ezza North/Ishielu

Personal details
- Occupation: Politician

Nwobashi Joseph is a Nigerian politician who currently serves as a second-term member of the Ebonyi State House of Assembly, representing the Ezza North/Ishielu Constituency of Ebonyi State.
