= Onueke =

- Location in Nigeria
- Coordinates: 6°20′N 8°06′E
- Country: Nigeria
- State: Ebonyi State
- LGA: Ezza South
- Time zone: UTC+1 (WAT)
- Climate: Aw

Onueke is the ancestral headquarters of the Ezza, Ezzas are the most populous clans in the Ebonyi State of Nigeria. Ezza people live in virtually all three senatorial zones of Ebonyi State and beyond, but are concentrated in the Ezza North, Ezza South, Onicha, Ishielu, and Ohaukwu Local Government Areas. The Ezza people in Ohaukwu dominates in Effium community inhabiting the Minor communities of Inikiri Umuezeoka, Umuezeokaoha, and Kpakpaji. Traditionally, Ezaas in all walks of life return to Onueke to offer sacrifices to the graves of their progenitors: Ezekuna and his wife, Anyigo Ezekuna. Coincidentally, Sacred Heart Parish, Onueke, also serves as the headquarters of Christianity for Ezaa Catholics. All saints parish, Onueke, also the headquarter of Ezza presbytery "Presbyterian Church of Nigeria". Other Pentecostal denominations present at Onueke include Foursquare Gospel Church Nigeria.

Onueke has been quite important politically speaking. It used to be the headquarters of the old Ezzikwo Division. It was also the headquarters of the old Ezza Local Government Area. Right now, it doubles as the headquarters of the Ezza South Local Government Area and Ebonyi Central Senatorial Zone comprising the Ezza South, Ezza North, Ishielu, and Ikwo Local Government Areas.

Historically Onueke has been a Neolithic foraging abode of the autochthonous Northeastern Igboid group the Anakiwha ancestors prior to the mid 1st millennium AD . Onueke and Afikpo (ehugbo) is noted as the oldest northeastern polity with the shared mercenarial hamlets system. The Ezaa people uses the ogbo system from Onueke to expand its territorial control across the 5 original Anakiwha clan (imoha, izzikworo, izzo, kpakpaji and Ukawu) toward other non Ekumaenyi areas (like Ezilo, Effium, Agba etc.). Onueke remains the head fortress of the Ezaa warships tradition.

== Etymology ==
Onueke derives its name from the famous Eke Imoha, one of the oldest and biggest markets in Ebonyi State. The Eke Imoha market is central to the economic life of Ezaa people. This is where the people sell their rich agricultural produce. Mainly farmers, the Ezaas produce yams, cassava, rice, cocoyams, and many other crops in abundance. These food crops, along with many other modern wares, are bought and sold in the Eke market, which is held every four days. The other markets in the Ezaa area include Awho, Nkwo, and Oryie. Eke is considered the first and biggest of these markets.
