= Patricia Obila =

Nigerian politician

Her Excellency Patricia Obila

Deputy Governor of Ebonyi State
- Incumbent
- Assumed office 29 May 2023
- Governor: Francis Nwifuru
- Preceded by: Eric Kelechi Igwe

Personal details
- Born: 23 November 1968 (age 57)
- Party: All Progressives Congress

Patricia Obila (born 23 November 1968) is a Nigerian politician who is serving as the deputy governor of Ebonyi State since 29 May 2023. A native of Nkpoghoro, Afikpo, she has served as the vice chairman of Afikpo North local government area for two terms.
