= Godwin Ogbaga =

Nigerian politician (born 1956)

Godwin Ogbaga OON

Personal details
- Born: October 1956 (age 69) Ebonyi State, South Eastern Nigeria
- Education: Obafemi Awolowo University (BSc); University of Nigeria (LLB); Nigerian Law School
- Occupation: Politician

Godwin Ogbaga is a Nigerian politician and seasoned administrator who was Minister of State for Power and Steel during the short term of Maj. Gen Abdulsalami Abubakar.

== Early life and education ==
Godwin Ogbaga was born in October 1956 in Ebonyi State, South Eastern Nigeria. He obtained a Bachelor of Science degree in Agricultural Economics in 1979 from University of Ife now Obafemi Awolowo University, Ile-Ife. He thereafter proceeded for his one-year compulsory National Youth Service in the same year at Nigeria Institute of Social and Economic Research, University of Ibadan. He also got an LLB (Hons.) degree in Law in 1995 at the University of Nigeria, Enugu Campus and later attended the Nigeria Law School, Lagos. He was called to the bar in March 1996, and qualified for legal practice as a Solicitor and Advocate of the Supreme Court of Nigeria.

== Abubakar Cabinet ==
Godwin Ogbaga was appointed Minister of State for Power and Steel in August 1998. He served in the ministerial position for nine months and brought electricity to many towns in different states of the federation, including Ebonyi State. Some of the electrification projects he attracted include: Iboko – Nwofe electrification, Nwofe – Mbeke electrification, Mbeke - Effium electrification, Odomoke – Ugbodo electrification, Oriuzor – Ebiaji – Achiagu electrification, Folk Tech College– Ikwo electrification, Akpoha – Afikpo electrification, NEPA permanent District office, Abakaliki, Transformers in Abakaliki, Afikpo, Effium, Ikwo, and other towns in Ebonyi state, Awgu electrification, Akpakpume – Nze electrification, Umuchigbo – Abakpa – Nike electrification and some other towns in Enugu State, Transformers in Trans - Ekulu, GRA, Ukehe and other towns in Enugu State, Transformers in Onitsha, Nnewi, Awka and other towns in Anambra state; etc.

== Others ==
In November 2005, Godwin was appointed the Clerk of Ebonyi House of Assembly. He had declared his intention to run for Ebonyi North senatorial seat in 2015 but ended up unsuccessful in the bid for the position. He was awarded a national honour of Officer of the Order of the Niger (OON) by President Muhammadu Buhari on 11 October 2022.
