= Francis Nwifuru =

Nigerian politician (born 1975)

His Excellency The Right Honourable Francis Nwifuru
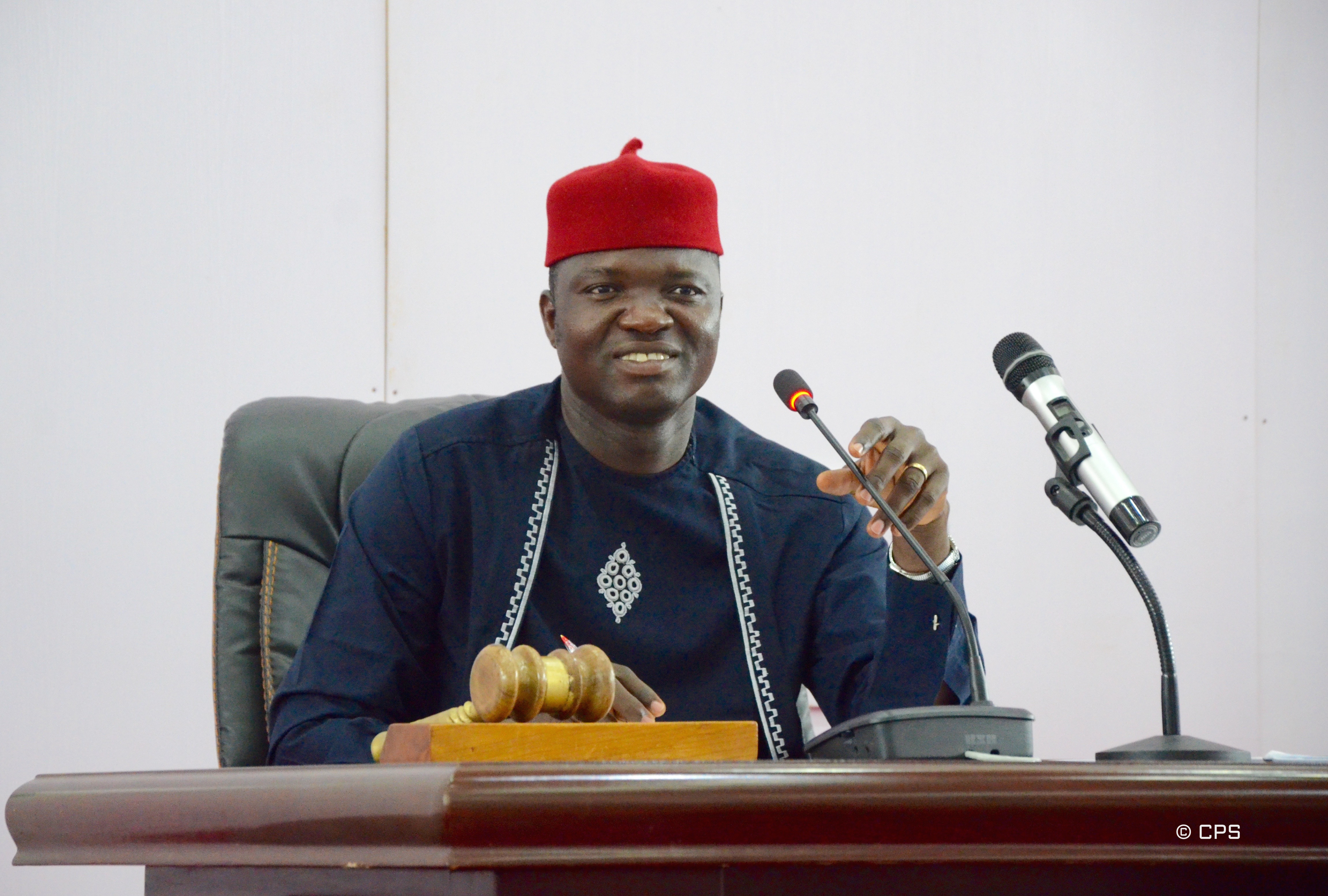
- Nwifuru in 2020

6th Governor of Ebonyi State
- Incumbent
- Assumed office 29 May 2023
- Deputy: Patricia Obila
- Preceded by: Dave Umahi

Speaker of the Ebonyi State House of Assembly
- In office 9 June 2015 – 29 May 2023

Personal details
- Born: 25 February 1975 (age 51) Oferekpe Agbaja, Izzi, Ebonyi State, Nigeria
- Spouse: Mary-Maudline Uzoamaka Nwifuru
- Occupation: Politician; lawyer; entrepreneur

Francis Ogbonna Erishi Nwifuru (born 25 February 1975) is a Nigerian politician and lawyer who is the current governor of Ebonyi State since 2023. He previously served as speaker of the Ebonyi State House of Assembly from June 2015 to May 2023. He hails from Oferekpe Agbaja in Izzi local government area of Ebonyi State.

Nwifuru represented Izzi West constituency at the Ebonyi State legislature between 2011 and 2023. He was the Deputy Chief Whip of the 4th Ebonyi State House of Assembly (2011–2015). During that period, he served as chairman Ebonyi State House of Assembly Committee on Lands, Survey, Urban Development and Environment. His journey into the State House of Assembly was under Peoples Democratic Party (PDP), until 2020, when he moved to the All Progressives Congress (APC).

== Early life and education ==
Nwifuru was born into a polygamous family of Chief and Mrs Nwifuru Nwamkpu. He got enrolled into Oferekpe Agbaja Community Primary School in the year 1991. He continued his education at the Community Secondary School, Nwofe Agbaja in the year 1999.

His educational activities weren't smooth-sailing. For a fact, he attended school only at intervals and joined his brothers in rearing of their father's numerous cattle.

Upon concluding his post-primary education, Ogbonna was christened 'Francis' after baptism as a Catholic. He enrolled into Ebonyi State University, Abakaliki, to study Building technology and Wood Work.

Nwifuru received a master's degree in Procurement, Logistics and Supply Chain Management from Salford University, Manchester, United Kingdom in June 2021.

== Career ==
In 2007 he ran for his state constituency in the Ebonyi State House of Assembly, but lost.

He was later appointed as an Ex-Officio State Executive Member of the Peoples Democratic Party (PDP), in Ebonyi State.

In March 2011, he took a second shot, won the election to represent Izzi West Constituency at Ebonyi State House of Assembly.

In that same tenure, he became the Deputy Chief Whip and chairman House Committee on Lands, Survey, Urban Development, and Environment.

He was re-elected in 2015 as 5th speaker of the Assembly. He was also re-elected for same positions in 2019; hence becoming the only member to have returned as a two-time Speaker in the history of Ebonyi State House of Assembly.

In 2020, he was elected as the National vice-chairman South East Conference of State Legislatures of Nigeria.

As the flagbearer of the All Progressives Congress during the 2023 Ebonyi gubernatorial election, Nwifuru garnered a total of 199,131 votes cast across the 13 local governments in the state to win the election.
