= Anayo Edwin Nwonu =

Nigerian politician

Anayo Edwin Nwonu (born 1975) is a Nigerian politician and member of the House of Representatives of Nigeria representing Ezza North/Ishielu Federal Constituency in Ebonyi State.
