= 2019 Nigerian House of Representatives elections in Ebonyi State =

The 2019 Nigerian House of Representatives elections in Ebonyi State was held on February 23, 2019, to elect members of the House of Representatives to represent Ebonyi State, Nigeria.

== Overview ==
Affiliation	Party		Total
Affiliation	APC	PDP	Total
Before Election	-	6	6
After Election	-	6	6

== Summary ==
District	Incumbent	Party	Elected Reps Member	Party
Abakaliki/Izzi	Sylvester Ogbaga	PDP	Sylvester Ogbaga	PDP
Afikpo North/Afikpo South	Iduma Igariwey	PDP	Iduma Igariwey	PDP
Ezza North/Ishielu	Edwin Anayo	PDP	Edwin Anayo	PDP
Ezza South/Ikwo	Chinedu Ogah	PDP	Lazarus Ogbee	PDP
Ebonyi/Ohaukwu	Chukwuma Nwazunku	PDP	Chukwuma Nwazunku	PDP
Ivo-Ohaozara/Onich	Linus Okorie	PDP	Livinus Makwe	PDP

== Results ==
=== Abakaliki/Izzi ===
A total of 11 candidates registered with the Independent National Electoral Commission to contest in the election. PDP candidate Sylvester Ogbaga won the election, defeating APC Nshii Uchenna Mbam and other party candidates.

2019 Nigerian House of Representatives election in Ebonyi State
Party	Candidate	Votes	%
PDP	Sylvester Ogbaga	40,890	
APC	Nshii Uchenna Mbam	21,541	
Others		320	
Total votes		62,751	
PDP hold			

=== Afikpo North/Afikpo South ===
A total of 10 candidates registered with the Independent National Electoral Commission to contest in the election. PDP candidate Iduma Igariwey won the election, defeating APC Anthony Ogbonna Ekoh and other party candidates.

2019 Nigerian House of Representatives election in Ebonyi State
Party	Candidate	Votes	%
PDP	Iduma Igariwey	28,691	
APC	Anthony Ogbonna Ekoh	9,951	
Others		9,286	
Total votes		47,928	
PDP hold			

=== Ezza North/Ishielu ===
A total of 10 candidates registered with the Independent National Electoral Commission to contest in the election. PDP candidate Edwin Anayo won the election, defeating APC Micheal .H. Ifere and other party candidates.

2019 Nigerian House of Representatives election in Ebonyi State
Party	Candidate	Votes	%
PDP	Edwin Anayo	34,373	
APC	Micheal .H. Ifere	13,372	
Others		1,195	
Total votes		48,940	
PDP hold			

=== Ezza South/Ikwo ===
A total of 8 candidates registered with the Independent National Electoral Commission to contest in the election. PDP candidate Lazarus Ogbee won the election, defeating APC Chinedu Ogar Nweke and other party candidates.

2019 Nigerian House of Representatives election in Ebonyi State
Party	Candidate	Votes	%
PDP	Lazarus Ogbee	31,296	
APC	Chinedu Ogar Nweke	27,695	
Others		204	
Total votes		59,195	
PDP hold			

=== Ebonyi/Ohaukwu ===
A total of 10 candidates registered with the Independent National Electoral Commission to contest in the election. PDP candidate Chukwuma Nwazunku won the election, defeating APC Peter Oge Ali and other party candidates.

2019 Nigerian House of Representatives election in Ebonyi State
Party	Candidate	Votes	%
PDP	Chukwuma Nwazunku	39,638	
APC	Peter Oge Ali	18,213	
Others		547	
Total votes		58,398	
PDP hold			

=== Ivo-Ohaozara/Onich ===
A total of 11 candidates registered with the Independent National Electoral Commission to contest in the election. PDP candidate Livinus Makwe won the election, defeating APC Odii Festus Ifesinachi and other party candidates.

2019 Nigerian House of Representatives election in Ebonyi State
Party	Candidate	Votes	%
PDP	Livinus Makwe	68,136	
APC	Odii Festus Ifesinachi	10,178	
Others		4,565	
Total votes		82,879	
PDP hold			
