= Eric Kelechi Igwe =

Nigerian lawyer and politician

Eric Kelechi

Deputy Governor of Ebonyi State
- In office 29 May 2015 – 29 May 2023
- Governor: Dave Umahi
- Succeeded by: Patricia Obila

Personal details
- Born: Eric Kelechi Igwe

Eric Kelechi Igwe is a Nigerian lawyer and politician who served as deputy governor of Ebonyi State from May 2015 to May 2023.

He was born in Ndufu Alike in Ikwo, Ebonyi State.

== Controversy ==
On March 8, 2022, Igwe and the governor Dave Umahi were sacked as Governor and Deputy Governor of Ebonyi State respectively by the Federal High Court in Abuja for defecting to the All Progressives Congress while in office. The court said that the popular votes given to Umahi belonged to the People's Democratic Party and by defecting from the party the office seizes to be theirs. The court immediately ordered the PDP to submit the name of their gubernatorial candidate to INEC or for a fresh gubernatorial election to be conducted in Ebonyi State.
