= Ezza North =

- LGA
- Interactive map of Ezza North
- Country: Nigeria
- State: Ebonyi State
- Capital: Ebiaji

Government
  - Member of House of Representatives: Anayo Edwin Nwonu
  - Member of State House of Assembly: Nwobashi Joseph

Area
  - Total: 305 km^{2} (118 sq mi)

Population (2006)
  - Total: 145,619
  - Density: 477/km^{2} (1,240/sq mi)
- Time zone: UTC+1 (WAT)
- 3-digit postal code prefix: 482

Ezza North is a local government area in Ebonyi State, Nigeria. Its headquarters is at Ebiaji town. It has an area of 305 km^{2} and a population of 145,619 at the 2006 census.

It is a predominantly Igbo town inhabited by the Ezza and the Orring people of Idzem (Amuda) and Okpolo (Okpomoro) extraction.

The postal code of the area is 482.

== History ==
Ezza North was created in 1996 alongside other LGAs in the then new Ebonyi State. It used to be part of old Ezza Local Government Area before its creation.

== Climate and geography ==
In Ezza North, the rainy season is usually warm, humid, and cloudy, while the dry season is hot, sticky, and partly cloudy. Throughout the year, temperatures generally range from about 18 °C (64 °F) to 33 °C (91 °F), and it is uncommon for them to rise above 33 °C (92 °F) . Ezza North LGA experiences two main seasons: the rainy season and the dry season. The area has an average temperature of about 27 °C (81 °F), and its humidity level generally stays around 69%.

== Economy ==
The primary occupation of the residents of Ezza North LGA is farming, where crops including rice, yam, cassava, and cocoyam are farmed in significant amounts. With the LGA housing a number of marketplaces, including the Eke Imoha market, which offers a venue for the exchange of a range of goods and services in the region, trade also flourishes there.
