= Ezza South =

- LGA
- Interactive map of Ezza South
- Location within Nigeria
- Country: Nigeria
- State: Ebonyi State
- Capital: Onueke

Area
  - Total: 324 km^{2} (125 sq mi)

Population (2006)
  - Total: 133,625
  - Density: 412/km^{2} (1,070/sq mi)
- Time zone: UTC+1 (WAT)
- Postal code: 482

Ezza South is a local government area located in Ebonyi State in south-eastern Nigeria. Its headquarters is Onueke, which also serves as a central town for the Ezza nation as well as the headquarters of Ebonyi Central senatorial zone.

== History ==
It was created on October 1, 1996, amongst other local government areas in the then new Ebonyi state by the military government of General Sani Abacha. Ezza South prior to its creation was part of old Ezza Local government area.

== Overview ==
The people are predominantly of Igbo stock. They speak Ezza dialect and the central Igbo language. Their major occupations are farming and trading as well as emerging civil servant class. It has an area of 324 km^{2} and a population of 133,625 at the 2006 census.

The postal code of the area is 482.

== Cimate and geography ==
Ezza South LGA spans about 324 square kilometres or 125 square miles and has two main seasons: the dry season and the rainy season. The area has an average temperature of around 27 °C (81 °F), and its average humidity level is about 69%. Ezza South LGA has an average yearly temperature of about 34 °C (93 °F) and gets around 1,350 mm (53 in) of rainfall each year. Like other parts of Ebonyi State, it has two main seasons the rainy season and the dry season.

== Economy ==
Most people in Ezza South LGA are farmers. They grow large amounts of rice, yam, cassava, and cocoyam. Trading is also common in the area, and the LGA has several busy markets, such as the Onueke and Ngamgbo Nwele markets, where people buy and sell many different goods and services.
