= Ebonyi State House of Assembly =

Legislative arm of the government of Ebonyi State of Nigeria

The Ebonyi State House of Assembly is the legislative arm of the government of Ebonyi State of Nigeria. It is a unicameral legislature with 24 members elected from the 13 local government areas of the state.

== Elections ==
- 1999 Ebonyi State House of Assembly election
- 2003 Ebonyi State House of Assembly election
- 2007 Ebonyi State House of Assembly election
- 2011 Ebonyi State House of Assembly election
- 2015 Ebonyi State House of Assembly election
