= Ivo, Ebonyi State =

Ivo, Nigeria
- LGA
- Interactive map of Ivo, Nigeria
- Coordinates: 5°53′N 7°37′E
- Country: Nigeria
- State: Ebonyi State
- Capital: Isiaka
- Time zone: UTC+1 (WAT)

Ivo is a local government area in Ebonyi State, Nigeria. Towns include Akaeze and Ishiagu, home of the Federal College of Agriculture, Ishiagu.

Oil pipelines passing through the area have been attacked by armed vandals who broke the pipes and scooped up the oil. Environmental damage caused by spillage has also been reported.

== Climate and Geography ==
Ivo LGA observes two separate seasons which are the wet and the dry seasons. The LGA has an average wind speed of 11 km/h or 6.8 mph and an average temperature of 27 degrees Celsius or 81 degrees Fahrenheit.

The area records an average yearly temperature of about 29 °C (84 °F) and receives roughly 1,350 millimetres (53 inches) of rainfall each year. Like the rest of Ebonyi State, it has two main seasons the rainy season and the dry season with temperatures generally falling between 27 °C (81 °F) and 34 °C (93 °F).

== Economy ==
Ivo LGA is known for farming and grows many crops like yam, rice, maize, cocoyam, and cassava. The area also has minerals like limestone. People in Ivo LGA also make pottery and do trading.

== Notable people ==
- Anyim Pius Anyim
- Tekno
- Angela Okorie
