= Ohaukwu =

Ohaukwu Ngbo\Izhia\Effium 135Izhiangbo
- LGA
- Motto: Land of God
- Interactive map of Ohaukwu
- Country: Nigeria
- State: Ebonyi State
- Capital: Ezzamgbo

Government
  - Type: Democratic system of government
  - local government chairman: Hon. Odono ikechukwu

Area
  - Total: 707.8 km^{2} (273.3 sq mi)

Population (2022)
  - Total: 291,300
  - Density: 411.6/km^{2} (1,066/sq mi)
- Time zone: UTC+1 (WAT)
- Postal code: 481

Ohaukwu is a Local Government Area of Ebonyi State, Nigeria.

The postal code of the area is 481.

== Geography and economy ==
Ohaukwu LGA is 517 square kilometres in size, and its average temperature is 28 °C or 82 °F. The average wind speed in the region is believed to be 9 kilometres per hour or 5.6 miles per hour, and the area experiences two different seasons: the dry and the wet seasons.

Ohaukwu LGA boasts a number of markets, including the Okwor Mgbo and Eke Ichi Idokpo markets, where a wide range of goods are purchased and sold. Farming is also a key element of the economy of Ohaukwu LGA with crops such as cassava, cocoyam, maize, rice, and vegetables growing in considerable amounts within the area. The Ohaukwu LGA's residents also participate in blacksmithing, livestock husbandry, and crafts.
