= Izzi, Nigeria =

Izzi
- Local government area
- Interactive map of Izzi
- Location within Nigeria
- Coordinates: 6°34′45″N 8°02′53″E
- Country: Nigeria
- State: Ebonyi
- Headquarters: Iboko

Government
  - Local Government Chairman: Hon. Barrister Emenike Steve

Area
  - Total: 2,264 km^{2} (874 sq mi)
- Elevation: 140 m (460 ft)
- Time zone: UTC+1 (WAT)

Izzi is a local government area of Ebonyi State in Nigeria.

== Geography and climate ==
The Izzi local government area is 2,264 square kilometres or 874 square miles in size, with an average temperature of 27 degrees Celsius or 81 degrees Fahrenheit. The LGA features the guinea savannah vegetation type with an approximate height of 140 metres (460 feet) above sea level. Izzi LGA is well vegetated and has an average humidity level of 70 percent.

Izzi LGA has a humid tropical climate with two main seasons: a rainy season that lasts about 8 months and a dry season that lasts about 4 months. During the dry season, temperatures usually fall between 27 °C and 35 °C, while in the rainy season, they range from 16 °C to 28 °C. Harmattan winds often occur in December and January. The area has an average yearly temperature of about 35 °C and a humidity level of around 50 to 60%. Izzi LGA receives about 2500 mm of rainfall each year.
