= David Umahi =

Nigerian politician (born 1963)

David Umahi CON
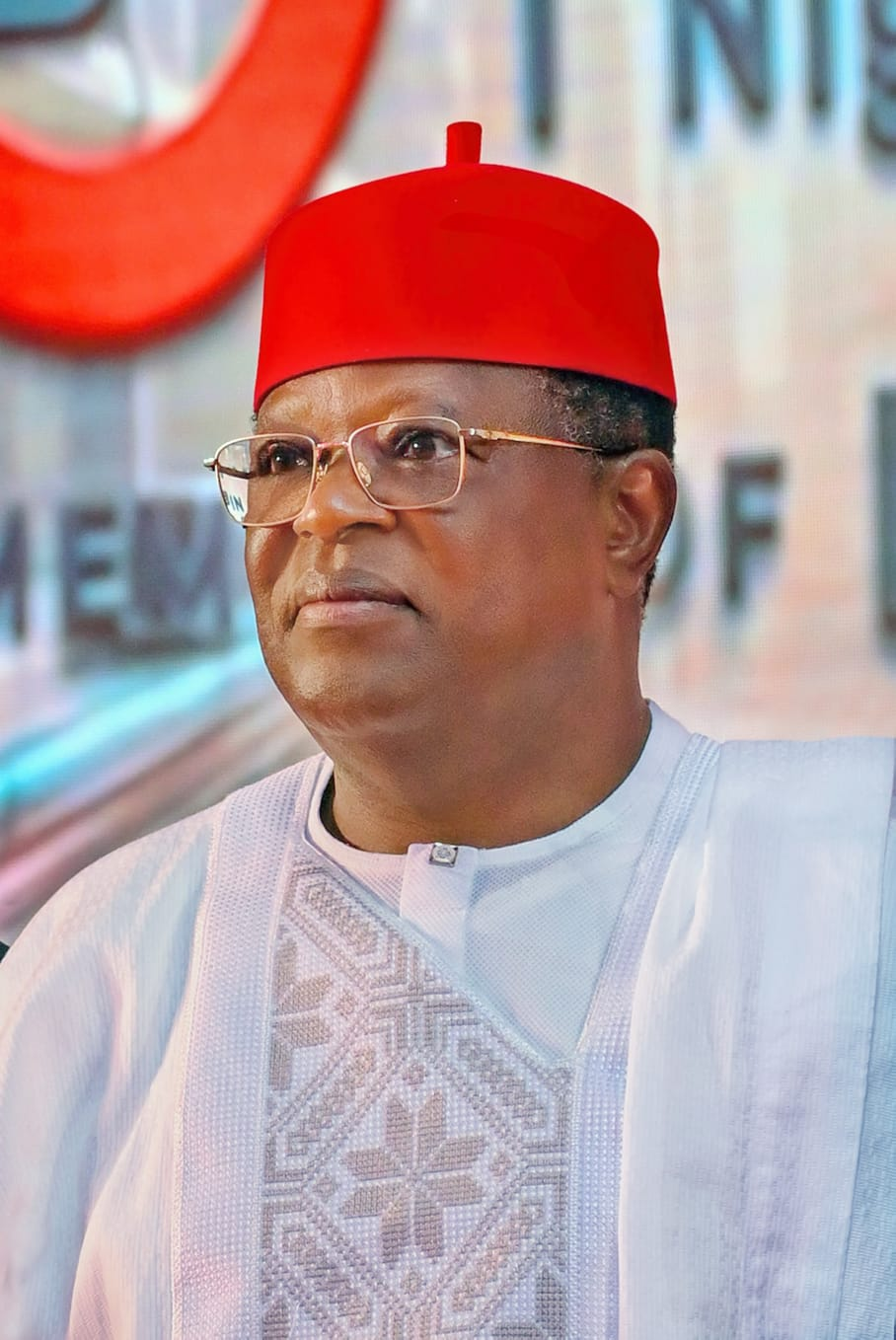

Minister of Works
- Incumbent
- Assumed office 21 August 2023
- President: Bola Tinubu
- Preceded by: Babatunde Fashola

Senator for Ebonyi South
- In office 13 June 2023 – August 2023
- Preceded by: Michael Ama Nnachi
- Succeeded by: Anthony Okorie Ani

Governor of Ebonyi State
- In office 29 May 2015 – 29 May 2023
- Deputy: Eric Kelechi Igwe
- Preceded by: Martin Elechi
- Succeeded by: Francis Nwifuru

Deputy Governor of Ebonyi State
- In office 29 May 2011 – 29 May 2015
- Governor: Martin Elechi
- Succeeded by: Eric Kelechi Igwe

Personal details
- Born: David Nweze Umahi; 25 July 1963 (age 63) Uburu, Eastern Region (now in Ebonyi State), Nigeria
- Party: All Progressives Congress
- Spouse: Rachael Umahi
- Relations: Austin Umahi
- Parents: Joseph Umahi Nwaze (father); Margaret Umahi (mother)
- Education: Government Secondary School, Afikpo; Anambra State University
- Occupation: Politician

David Nweze Umahi CON (born 25 July 1963) is a Nigerian politician who is the Minister of Works of Nigeria. He previously was the senator representing Ebonyi South senatorial district from June to August 2023, and as the governor of Ebonyi State from 2015 to 2023; and deputy governor from 2011 to 2015.

On 16 August 2023, President Bola Tinubu appointed him as Minister of Works following his nomination, screening, and approval by the Senate. He was sworn into office on 21 August 2023.

== Early life and education ==
Umahi was born on 25 July 1964. He is the son of Elder Joseph Umahi Nwaze and Margaret Umahi of Umunaga, Uburu in Ohaozara Local Government Area, now in Ebonyi State. Umahi received his secondary education from Ishiagu High School and the Government Secondary School of Afikpo before attending the Enugu State University of Science and Technology in 1982. He graduated in 1987 with a Bachelor of Science Degree in Civil Engineering.

In 1990, he co-founded Norman Engineering and Construction Nig. Limited with Ombo Isokarari and was its general manager until 1993. Until 2011, he was chairman and CEO of Brass Engineering & Construction Nig. Ltd., Focus Investment Nig. Ltd., and Osborn La Palm Royal Resort Ltd. He is from a home of nine comprising two females and seven males, including Major-General Obi Abel Umahi (Rtd.), the former chairman of the South-East Security Committee, Ebubeagu but resigned in May 2021. Roy Umahi Nwaeze, a legal practitioner, Austin Umahi Nweze who was the former south east vice chairman of the People's Democratic Party.

== Politics ==
Umahi entered public service in 2007 as the acting chairman of the Ebonyi State chapter of the People's Democratic Party. From 2009 to 2011, he was state chairman of the party. During that term, he served a year on the governing board of the Federal Medical Centre in Asaba as its chairman.

In 2011, Umahi became the Deputy Governor of Ebonyi State on a ticket with the-then Governor Martin Elechi. However, in 2014, Governor Elechi supported Onyebuchi Chukwu, Minister of Health, as his successor, which Umahi stated violated an understanding that he would take that role. Umahi went ahead to defeat Chukwu in the primaries. The remainder of Elechi's term was chaotic, with arson hitting the House of Assembly in February 2015 and motions taken to impeach him later that month over alleged unconstitutional gross misconduct, misappropriation of funds and anti-party activities.

Umahi was elected to the role of Governor on 12 April 2015 on the platform of People's Democratic Party (PDP). The election was later challenged by the Labour Party, All Progressives Congress and All Progressives Grand Alliance on the basis of "widespread irregularities, killings, and wanton destruction of property". In October 2015, the legitimacy of the election was upheld by the Governorship Election Tribunal.

On 16 March 2019, Umahi was re-elected as governor in the Ebonyi state governorship election. He polled 393,343 votes to defeat APC's Sonny Ogbuoji who polled 81,703 votes. Umahi won APC Ebonyi South Senatorial district elections in 2022.

=== Defection to the APC ===
On 11 November 2020 Umahi declared his intention to join the All Progressives Congress and on 17 November 2020 he officially defected to the party after a long time speculation. Umahi made his declaration of joining the APC for reasons according to him, one of them being that " ...the People's Democratic Party has been unfair to the Southeast Geopolitical Zone..." and secondly, "...that it has been hijacked by one or two individuals". He also doused the speculation against him that he joined the APC because he wanted a presidential ticket which wasn't promised to him in the PDP by saying that he would quit politics in 2023 after leaving office as governor.

President Muhammadu Buhari also congratulated Umahi for his defection to the APC, he described it as a bold step driven by principle rather than opportunistic moves or coercion

On 11 January 2022 Umahi declared his intention to run for the office of the President of Nigeria in the 2023 general elections after consulting with President Muhammadu Buhari just days after the declaration of a leader in the APC, Bola Ahmed Tinubu. This conflicts with his earlier statement when he defected to the APC that he would quit politics after his tenure as governor.

On 8 March 2022 Umahi and his deputy Eric Kelechi Igwe were sacked as Governor and Deputy Governor of Ebonyi State respectively by the Federal High Court in Abuja for defecting to the All Progressives Congress while in office. The court said that the popular votes given to Umahi belonged to the People's Democratic Party (PDP) and by defecting from the party the office ceases to be theirs. The court immediately ordered the PDP to submit the name of their gubernatorial candidate to INEC or for a fresh gubernatorial election to be conducted in Ebonyi State. On 11 March 2022, the State High Court granted Umahi and his Deputy Eric Kelechi Igwe interim of seven days in office. On 1 April 2022, The Court of Appeal in Enugu State affirmed Umahi as Governor of Ebonyi State, saying his defection to the APC was immoral but not unconstitutional while affirming an earlier judgement by the Federal High Court in Ebonyi. However the grounds for the sack of Umahi by the Federal High Court in Abuja is different from the Federal High Court in Ebonyi. The Court of Appeal in Abuja is yet to hear the appeal of the judgement of the Federal High Court in Abuja.

== Corruption allegations ==
On 29 January 2021, Peoples Gazette reported that throughout Umahi's tenure as deputy governor and governor, he had transferred more than ₦3.6 billion in government money to his company, Brass Engineering & Construction Nigeria Limited. Bank records showed the payments starting in 2011, when Umahi became deputy governor to Martin Elechi, and continued into his term as governor. In response, Umahi and an aide threatened Peoples Gazette reporters on phone calls and the Peoples Gazette website was blocked, before requesting a retraction and ₦1 billion as "atonement" from the newspaper. After the paper stood by its story, Umahi sued the Peoples Gazette for defamation and demanded ₦2 billion in damages.

== Personal life ==
Dave Umahi is married to Rachael Umahi. She is the daughter of Mr and Mrs Chukwu and Eunice Akpa of Umuobuna, Uburu in Ohaozara Local Government Area of Ebonyi State.

== Award and Recognitions ==
In October 2022, a Nigerian national honour of Commander of the Order of the Niger (CON) was conferred on him by President Muhammadu Buhari.

David Umahi is the first living Nigerian to have a federal university 'the David Umahi Federal University of Health Sciences' in Uburu named in his honour.

== See also ==
- List of state governors of Nigeria
- List of governors of Ebonyi State
- List of people from Ebonyi State
- Ebonyi State Executive Council
