= Ohaozara =

LGA in Ebonyi State, Nigeria

- LGA
- Interactive map of Ohaozara
- Country: Nigeria
- State: Ebonyi State
- Headquarters: Uburu

Government
  - Local Government Chairman: Chinonso Ajah

Area
  - Total: 312 km^{2} (120 sq mi)

Population (2006)
  - Total: 148,628
  - Density: 476/km^{2} (1,230/sq mi)
- Time zone: UTC+1 (WAT)
- Postal code: 491

Ohaozara is a Local Government Area of Ebonyi State, Nigeria. It is made up of Ugwulangwu, Uburu and Okposi. The headquarters are in the town of Uburu. It has an area of 312 km^{2} (120 sq mi) and a population of 148,626 as of the 2006 census.

The Ohaozara local government is made up of the Ohaozara people subgroup of Igbo people and they speak the Ohaozara dialect.

The current chairman is Chinonso Ajah. The local government is under the Ohanivo Federal Constituency currently represented by Livinus Mbakwe. It is also under the Ebonyi South Senetorial District being represented currently by Michael Ama Nnachi.

The postal code of the area is 491.

The 1976 to 1996 Ohaozara LGA (under Imo and Abia state) is today split into three area councils namely; Ohaozara local government, Onicha local government and Ivo local government of Ebonyi state. It's known as Old Ohaozara or commonly OHANIVO (acronyms of OHAozara, oNicha and IVO. The three local government areas now belong to one constituency called the Ohanivo Federal Constituency.

== Geography and economy ==
Ohaozara experiences a tropical climate marked by warm temperatures ranging from 28 to 32 °C (82 to 90 °F), high humidity of about 46%, and an annual rainfall of roughly 2,000 mm (79 in). The area has distinct wet and dry seasons, and thunderstorms are common, especially during parts of the rainy season, as reflected in current weather forecasts. Ohaozara LGA covers about 312 square kilometres or 120 square miles and records an average temperature of around 28 °C (82 °F). The area experiences two main seasons the dry season and the rainy season—and has an estimated average wind speed of about 9 km/h (5.6 mph).

== Economy ==
Ohaozara LGA is well known for its abundant salt deposits, making salt mining and processing major economic activities in the area. Agriculture also plays a significant role in the local economy, with residents cultivating crops like yam, cassava, rice, and maize in substantial amounts. Trade and hunting further contribute to the economic life of the LGA.
