= Onicha =

- LGA
- Interactive map of Onicha
- Country: Nigeria
- State: Ebonyi State
- Capital: Isu

Government
  - Local government chairman: Ogbofia Ikechukwu

Area
  - Total: 476 km^{2} (184 sq mi)

Population (2006)
  - Total: 236,828
  - Density: 498/km^{2} (1,290/sq mi)
- Time zone: UTC+1 (WAT)
- Postal code: 491

Onicha// is a Local Government Area of Ebonyi State, Nigeria. It is made up of the following towns; Oshiri, Onicha-Igboeze, Abaomege, Ukawu, Isu, Ugwulangu and Isinkwo. The headquarters is located in the town of Isu. The area council derived its name from the town of Onicha-Igboeze.

The local government is made up two subgroups of Igbo people; Ezza people (Ukawu, Abaomega and Isinkwo) and Ohaozara people (Oshiri, Isu and Onicha-Igboeze). It was created in 1991 from the Ohaozara Local Government while creating Abia state. It has an area of 476 km^{2} and has a population of 236,828 according to the 2006 census. The chairman is Hon. Ogbofia Ikechukwu. The postal code of the area is .

== Climate and geography ==
The climate of Onicha is savanna, or tropical wet and dry. The district's yearly temperature is 28.58 °C and it is -0.88% lower than Nigeria's norms. There are 204.98 wet days and 201.58 millimetres or 7.936 inches of precipitation in Ndiagu-Onicha each year.

Onicha LGA experiences an average wind speed of 11 km/h (6.8 mph) and an average temperature of 28 degrees Celsius or 82 degrees Fahrenheit. The LGA experiences two distinct seasons: the dry season, which occurs between October and February, and the rainy season, which lasts from March to September.

== Economy ==
Rice, yam, cassava, and maize are among the crops that are widely farmed in Onicha LGA, which has a rich agricultural history. The Abaomege Central Market, one of the LGA's many marketplaces where a range of goods are bought and sold, is part of the area's thriving commercial industry. Onicha LGA residents also work in crafts and hunting.
