= Michael Ologunde =

Nigerian academic

Vice-Chancellor of Ladoke Akintola University of Technology
- In office 2019–2021
- Preceded by: Adeniyi Sulaimon Gbadegesin
- Succeeded by: Mojeed Olaide Liasu

Personal details
- Born: Michael Olufisayo Ologunde
- Profession: Academic

Michael Olufisayo Ologunde is a professor of food science and the first indigenous Vice-chancellor of Ladoke Akintola University of Technology after the tenure of his predecessor, Adeniyi Sulaiman Gbadegesin. He was sacked by the Oyo State Government in 2021 over undisclosed reasons.

== Career ==
Ologunde is a professor of food science and engineering. He was elected the Vice-Chancellor of Ladoke Akintola University of Technology and assumed office on the 14th of February, 2019, after the screening of seven candidates who contested for the position by the governing council. He was the top candidate with Timothy Adebayo and Idowu Adetunji coming second and third respectively during the selection process.

== Controversy ==
In 2021, a letter from the Oyo state government through the Commissioner of the state sacked Ologunde for undisclosed reasons. This sparked controversy across the school and drew condemnation from the Academic Staff Union of Universities in Nigeria.
