= Nigerian Civil Service =

Organization of Nigerian government

- The Nigeria Civil Service Handbook 1978.

Organisation overview
- Jurisdiction: Government of Nigeria
- Headquarters: Abuja, Nigeria
- Organisation executive: Didi Esther Walson-Jack, Head of the Civil Service of the Federation
- Website: www.ohcsf.gov.ng

The Nigerian Civil Service consists of employees in Nigerian government agencies other than the military and police. Most employees are career civil servants in the Nigerian ministries, progressing based on qualifications and seniority. Recently the head of the service has been introducing measures to make the ministries more efficient and responsive to the public. The Nigerian Civil Service has its origins in organizations established by the British in colonial times.

== History ==
Nigeria gained full independence in October 1960 under a constitution that provided for a parliamentary government and a substantial measure of self-government for the country's three regions. Since then, various panels have studied and made recommendations for reforming of the Civil Service, including the Margan Commission of 1963, the Adebo Commission of 1971 and the Udoji Commission of 1972–74.

A major change occurred with the 1979 adoption of a constitution modeled on that of the United States. The Dotun Philips Panel of 1985 attempted to reform the Civil Service. The 1988 Civil Service Reorganization Decree promulgated by General Ibrahim Babangida had a major impact on the structure and efficiency of the Civil Service. The later report of the Ayida Panel made recommendations to reverse some of the past innovations and to return to the more efficient Civil Service of earlier years. The Civil Service has been undergoing gradual and systematic reforms and restructuring since May 29, 1999 after decades of military rule. However, the civil service is still considered stagnant and inefficient, and the attempts made in the past by panels have had little effect.

In August 2009, the Head of the Civil Service, Stephen Osagiede Oronsaye, proposed reforms where permanent secretaries and directors would spend a maximum of eight years in office. The reform, approved by President Umaru Yar'Adua, would result in massive retirement of Permanent Secretaries and Directors, many of whom are from the North. Stephen Oronsaye has said that his goal is for the Nigerian civil service to be among the best organized and managed in the world. Oronsaye retired in November 2010 at the statutory age of 60 and was succeeded by Oladapo Afolabi.

On November 10, 2015, President Muhammadu Buhari summoned all the permanent secretaries to the Presidential Villa in Aso Rock and compulsorily retired 17 of them; their retirement in force with immediate effect.

It launched the International Civil Service Conference (ICSC), in 2025, bringing together public sector experts, private sector partners, civil servants and other key stakeholders across the globe.

== Structure ==
- Federal Civil Service Commission

=== Regional services ===
- Rivers State Civil Service
- Lagos State Civil Service Lagos State Civil Service
- Ogun State Civil Service Government of Ogun State

=== Parastatals ===
OHCSF has four parastatals which are:

- Administrative Staff College of Nigeria (ASCON)Administrative Staff College of Nigeria
- Public Service Institute of Nigeria (PSIN)
- Federal Training Centres (FTCs)

== Head of the Civil Service ==
For many years, the post was concurrent with that of Secretary to the Government of the Federation.

Head of Government	Name	Tenure Start	Tenure End
Sir Abubakar Tafawa Balewa	Dr. S. O. Wey	1 September 1961	16 January 1966
Johnson Aguiyi-Ironsi Yakubu Gowon	Harlen Anireju Ejueyitchie	4 August 1966	20 December 1970
Johnson Aguiyi-Ironsi Yakubu Gowon	A. A. Atta	21 December 1970	12 June 1972
Johnson Aguiyi-Ironsi Yakubu Gowon	Charles Olatunde Lawson	16 August 1972	31 March 1975
Yakubu Gowon Murtala Muhammed Olusegun Obasanjo	A. A. Ayida	23 April 1975	31 March 1977
Olusegun Obasanjo	Adamu Liman Ciroma	1 April 1977	30 September 1979
Shehu Shagari	Shehu Ahmadu Musa	1 October 1979	31 December 1983
Muhammadu Buhari Ibrahim Babangida	G. A. Longe	1 January 1984	30 January 1986
?	Abu Obe	?	?
Olusegun Obasanjo	Yayale Ahmed	18 December 2000	26 July 2007
Umaru Musa Yar'Adua	Ebele Ofunneamaka Okeke	26 July 2007	16 June 2008
Umaru Musa Yar'Adua	Amal Pepple	16 June 2008	June 2009
Umaru Musa Yar'Adua Goodluck Jonathan	Stephen Osagiede Oronsaye	June 2009	18 November 2010
Goodluck Jonathan	Oladapo Afolabi	18 November 2010	29 September 2011
Goodluck Jonathan	Isa Bello Sali	29 September 2011	August 2015
Muhammadu Buhari	Winifred Oyo-Ita	August 2015	18 September 2019
Muhammadu Buhari Bola Tinubu	Folashade Yemi-Esan	18 September 2019	14 August 2024
Bola Tinubu	Didi Esther Walson-Jack	14 August 2024	26 August 2026
Bola Tinubu	Abel Olumuyiwa Enitan	27 August 2026	present

== See also ==
- Federal Ministries of Nigeria
- Politics of Nigeria
- Civil Service Commission of Nigeria
