= Abimbola Salu-Hundeyin =

Nigerian lawyer

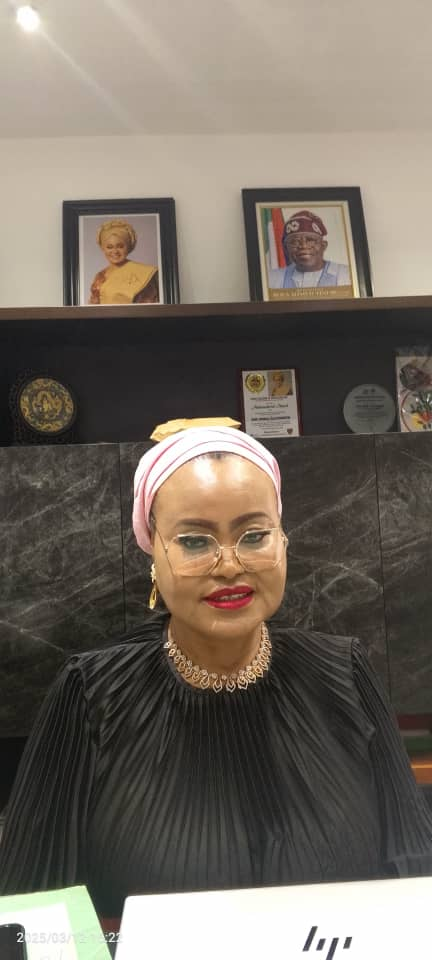
Secretary to the State Government (SSG) of Lagos State

Bimbola Salu-Hundeyin is a Nigerian lawyer who has been serving as the 19th Secretary to the State Government (SSG) of Lagos State since 2023 replacing Folashade Sherifat Jaji.

Salu-Hundeyin has also served as a special adviser (legal) to the Minister of the Federal Capital Territory, Senator Bala Mohammed. Before her appointment, she was a commissioner representing Lagos State in the National Population Commission (NPC). In 2019, she was elected as the chairperson of African Union-African Population Experts Committee (AU-APEC).

Salu-Hundeyin is a lawyer by profession, a solicitor of the Supreme Court of Nigeria.
