= FCSC =

FCSC may refer to:

- Foreign Claims Settlement Commission, a United States quasi-judicial agency that adjudicates claims of U.S. nationals against foreign governments
- Federal Civil Service Commission (Nigeria), an executive agency responsible for managing civil servants in Nigeria
