= Mojeed Olaide Liasu =

Nigerian academic

Vice-Chancellor of Ladoke Akintola University of Technology
- In office 2021–2023
- Preceded by: Michael Ologunde
- Succeeded by: Razaq Olatunde Rom Kalilu

Personal details
- Born: Mojeed Olaide Liasu
- Died: 2023
- Profession: Academic

Mojeed Olaide Liasu was a professor of plant physiology and the acting vice-chancellor of Ladoke Akintola University of Technology. He died in 2023 at the age of 70 years.

== Career ==
Liasu was a professor and the deputy vice-chancellor of LAUTECH before he was appointed as the acting vice-chancellor of LAUTECH on 23 August 2021 by the Oyo State Government and announced by the governing council of the school, his appointment came after the immediate replacement of his predecessor, Michael Ologunde.

== Death ==
Liasu died in 2023 at the age of 70 years, leaving behind a wife.
