= Sulaimon =

Sulaimon is both a given name and a surname. It is the Yoruba rendering of the Arabic Suleiman. Notable people with the name include:

- Sulaimon Adekunle (born 1990), Nigerian footballer
- Sulaimon Runsewe (born 2001), Nigerian cricketer
- Rasheed Sulaimon (born 1994), American-Nigerian basketball player
- Adeniyi Sulaimon Gbadegesin (born 1958), Nigerian academic
- Yusuf Sulaimon Lasun (born 1960), Nigerian politician
