= Timothy Adebayo =

Nigerian academic

Timothy A. Adebayo
- Born: 25 December 1962 (age 63); Osun State, Nigeria
- Occupation: Academician
- Title: Professor

Academic background
- Education: Obafemi Awolowo University, Ile-Ife

Academic work
- Discipline: Agriculture scholar
- Sub-discipline: Entomology and Toxicology specialist
- Institutions: Vice-Chancellor of Ajayi Crowther University, Oyo

Timothy Abiodun Adebayo (born 25 December 1962) is a Nigerian academic. He is a professor of Entomology and Pesticide Toxicology and the fourth Vice Chancellor of the Ajayi Crowther University, Oyo, Oyo State.

== Early life ==
Adebayo was born in Esa-Oke, Obokun Local Government Area of Osun State. After obtaining his First School Leaving Certificate and the West African School Certificate, he proceeded to Obafemi Awolowo University (OAU), Ile-Ife, Osun State, where he earned a bachelor's degree in plant science in 1988. He completed the mandatory one-year National Youth Service Corps (NYSC) program. Following this, he returned to OAU to obtain a Master of Science (M.Sc.) degree in plant science in 1992, and subsequently earned a Doctor of Philosophy (Ph.D.) in Entomology from Ladoke Akintola University of Technology, Ogbomoso, Oyo State, in 2003.

== Career ==
Adebayo joined the Department of Agronomy at Ladoke Akintola University of Technology, Ogbomoso, in 1992 as an Assistant Lecturer, eventually rising to become the Department Head. He was promoted to Full Professor at Ladoke Akintola University of Technology in 2006. Since then, he has served in various capacities, including chairman, Admission Committee; the institution's Coordinator of Students Industrial Work Experience Scheme (SIWES), and Deputy Vice-Chancellor (Academics) from 2014 to 2016 during the tenure of Professor Adeniyi Sulaimon Gbadegesin. His research has been published in local and international journals

On 17 September 2020, Adebayo was appointed the fourth substantive Vice Chancellor of Ajayi Crowther University, Oyo, by the institution's Governing Council, led by Chief Wole Olanipekun (SAN). He entered office on 2 October 2020, succeeding Prof. Dapo Folorunsho Asaju.
