= Nigerian Institute of Management =

Non-profit institution

- Formation: 1961
- Type: Professional Association
- Purpose: Promote professionalism in management
- Location: Lagos
- Region served: Nigeria
- President: Commodore Abimbola Olaribigbe Ayuba,(RTD) FNIM
- Website: www.nim.ng

The Nigerian Institute of Management (NIM) is a non-profit institution that defines the required skills and standards for professional managers, and offers courses leading to diplomas in Management.

== History ==
The Nigerian Management Group was formed in 1961 as the first management institute in Nigeria. The organization was renamed the Nigerian Institute of Management in 1964 and incorporated as a non-profit company. On 19 June 2003 the National Assembly passed the Nigerian Institute of Management Establishment Act 2003. This gave the NIM the formal authority to regulate the management profession in Nigeria. In December 2005 the Institute was waiting for the Jigawa State government to provide a site on which the institute could build a management center.

== Business leaders' platform ==
In November 2006 NIM President Alhaji Mohammed Abubakar, after describing how political leaders had stolen $480 billion since 1960, said that all sectors of the economy were suffering from endemic management failure. In December 2007 the new NIM President Sir Peter Edeoghon said he would focus on ways to improve the institute's performance in regulating the industry and promoting best practices. In November 2008, Edeoghon called on the federal government to increase investment in the non-oil sector. The November 2008 International Management Conference of the NIM wound up with a call for a change in the government's emphasis to a focus on wealth creation rather than poverty reduction. The two-day conference was held jointly with the Association of Management Organisations in Africa (AMOA).

== Politicians' platform ==
NIM meetings provide an opportunity for politicians to address senior business leaders. In August 2002 President Olusegun Obasanjo called on NIM members to lead the fight against corruption. At the September 2009 annual meeting of the NIM, President Umaru Musa Yar'Adua praised the NIM for its commitment to the development of Nigeria. At the September 2010 annual meeting President Goodluck Jonathan, represented by Civil Service Head Stephen Oronsaye, pledged to fight corruption and urged the members to assist in this cause. In July 2011 Chief Emeka Anyaoku gave the NIM's golden jubilee lecture on the topic: "Nigeria at 50: The Challenges of Nationhood". Talking about the recent attack in Abuja by Boko Haram members he called for a national conference on security to review Nigeria's structural problems and to end the immunity of senior politicians.
