= Damilola Sonayon James =

Nigerian politician and public servant

APC, Asst. Women Leader, and Deputy Governorship Candidate, Lagos State.

Personal details
- Born: Damilola Badagry, Lagos State, Nigeria
- Education: University of Hull
- Occupation: Politician
- Known for: Politics and community development

Damilola Sonayon James is a Badagry-born politician, public servant and community development advocate. She is born into a royal family of Kweme kingdom in Badagry west Local Development Area Government Area, Lagos State. She is the daughter of Late Hon. Bolarinwa Sonayon James, a former Member of the House of Representatives representing Badagry federal constituency.

== Early life and education ==
Princess Damilola attended ASCON Staff school Badagry, and Lagos State Model College, Kankon, Lagos State. She proceeding to United Kingdom, where she obtained a Bachelor of Science degree in Business and Human Resources Management from the University of Hull. She later earned a Master of Science degree in social work, with specialization in Community Development, from Ladoke Akintola University of Technology, Ogbomoso.

== Career ==
Damilola has worked both in public and private sector before she joined politics. She spent six years with the Lagos State Internal Revenue Service (LIRS), before moving to join Conrad Clark Nigeria as head of sustainability risk and strategy, and a consultant to Bolt Nigeria.

In 2020, she was part of the technical team that reviewed the Lagos state youth policy, aligning its framework with United Nations guidelines to improve youth inclusion.

== Politics ==
Her political career started from Badagry West Local Council Development Area where she served as the Supervisory Councilor for Agriculture and Social Services. In 2025, She threw her hat into the ring of the chairmanship position of Badagry west LCDA. Although she could not secure the party ticket but was subsequently appointed as the Lagos State, APC Women Leader. before her emerges as the governorship candidate for the same party in the coming 2027 general election.
