= Shuaheeb Olabode Agoro =

Lagos State Head of Service

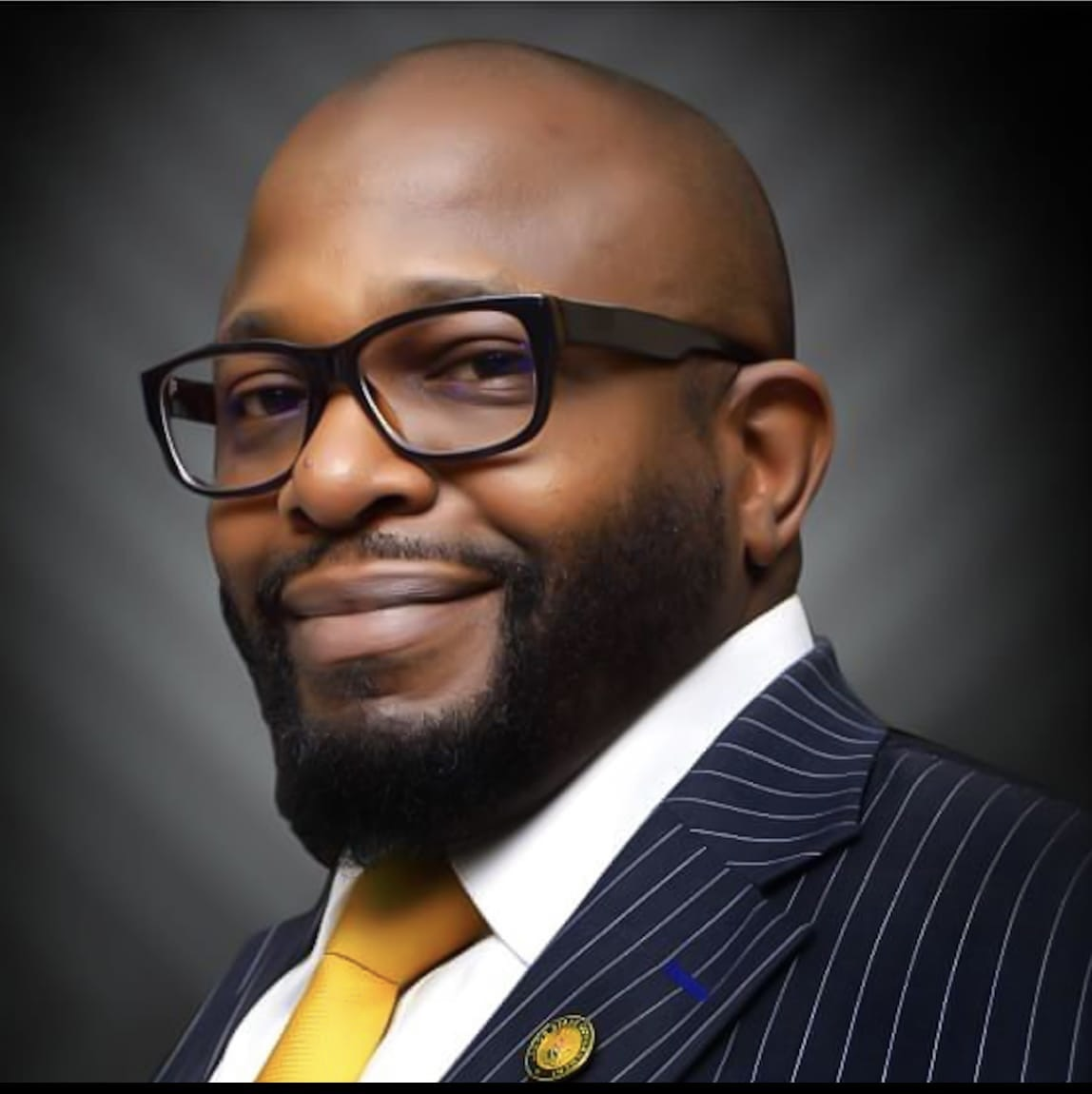
- Official portrait

Lagos State Head of Service
- Incumbent
- Assumed office 30 September 2023
- Preceded by: Hakeem Muri-Okunola

Personal details
- Spouse: Oyinlola Agoro
- Education: St Gregory's College; Leeds Metropolitan University (LLB); Nigerian Law School; University of Dundee (LLM, Petroleum Law and Policy); BPP Law School; Harvard Kennedy School (certificate)

Shuaheeb Olabode "Bode" Agoro is a Nigerian lawyer and civil servant who has served as the 22nd Head of Service of Lagos State since 30 September 2023.

== Early life and education ==
Agoro attended St. Gregory's College in Lagos and studied law at Leeds Metropolitan University (LLB), before being called to the Nigerian Bar. He obtained an LLM in Petroleum Law and Policy from the University of Dundee's Centre for Energy, Petroleum and Mineral Law and Policy, and completed professional training at BPP Law School in London. He also earned a certificate in public leadership from the Harvard Kennedy School and was admitted as a solicitor in England and Wales in 2002.

== Career ==
Agoro joined the Lagos State Civil Service in 2003 and worked in the Lands Bureau in various roles, including Director of Land Services (2003–2005) and Director of Land Regularisation (2006–2015). He was appointed Permanent Secretary of the Lands Bureau on 3 August 2015.

== Head of Service ==
On 22 September 2023, Governor Babajide Sanwo-Olu appointed Agoro as the 22nd Head of Service of Lagos State, effective 30 September 2023. He was sworn in on 30 September 2023.

Reports in the Nigerian press have highlighted Agoro's focus on staff welfare, administrative reforms, and the continuation of digital initiatives in land administration.

== Media coverage ==
Agoro has been the subject of multiple feature-length profiles in the Nigerian media. BusinessDay described his leadership as linking public service to nation-building. ThisDay characterised his appointment as bringing "fresh air" to the Lagos civil service. In an interview with Punch, Agoro discussed his decision to leave professional football for a career in the civil service. Independent Newspapers and The Nation have also published extended coverage of his appointment and inauguration.

== Personal life ==
Agoro is married to Oyinlola Agoro.
