= YALI RLC West Africa =

- Young African Leaders Initiative Regional Leadership Center (YALI RLC), West Africa
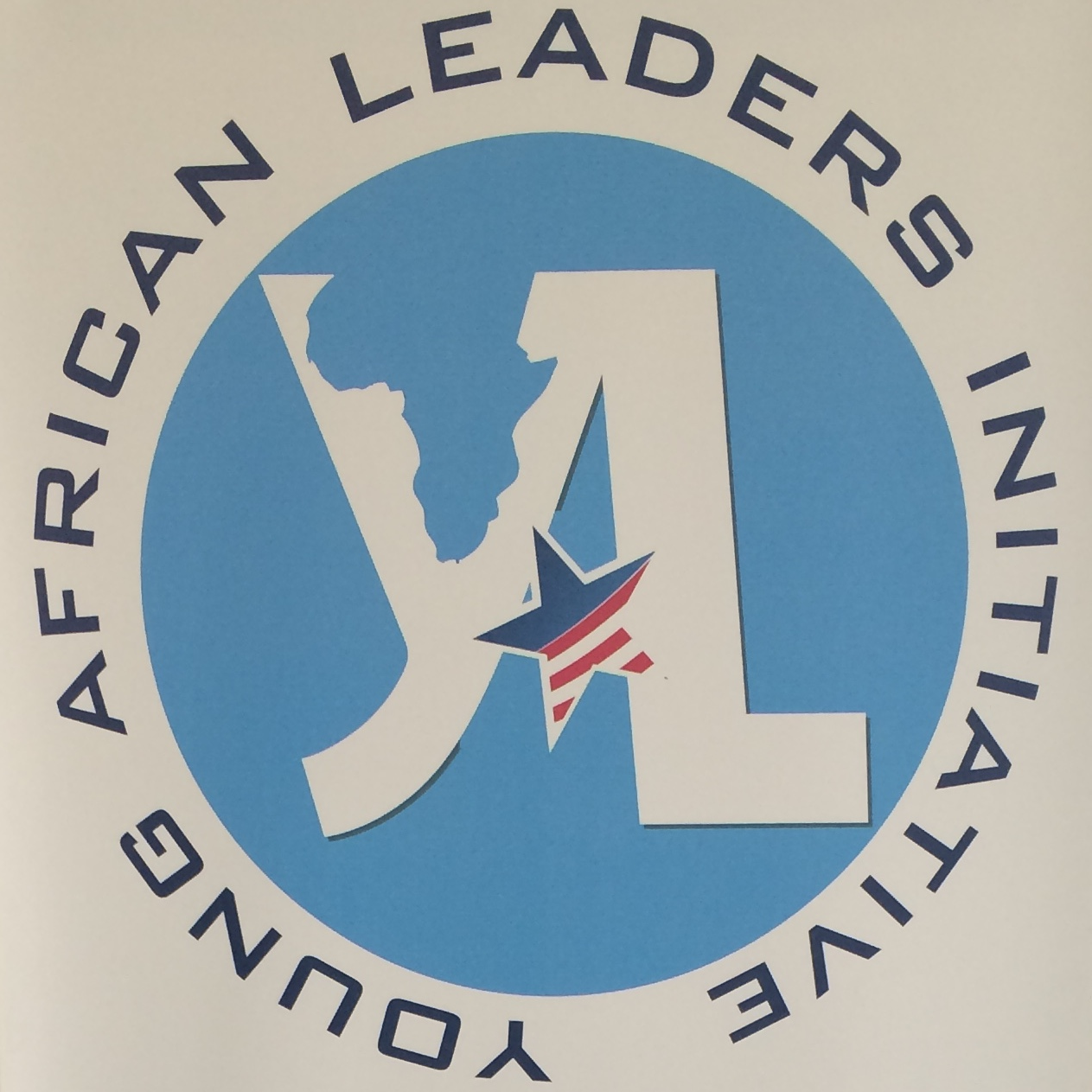
- Founder: Barack Obama
- Founded at: United States of America
- Type: Non-governmental organisation, Education
- Purpose: Human Capital Development within West Africa.
- Headquarters: Accra
- Origins: 2015
- Region served: West Africa
- Fields: Education
- Official language: English, French
- Parent organization: Young African Leaders Initiative (YALI)
- Website: yaliwestafrica.net/rlc

YALI RLC West Africa is one of the four regional leadership centres across Africa. The Ghana campus is situated at GIMPA in Accra, provides leadership training, networking, and professional development activities for young people ages 18–35 in West Africa (Gambia, Ghana, Liberia, Nigeria, Sierra Leone, Burkina Faso, Côte d'Ivoire, Togo). RLC is the acronym for Regional Leadership Center (RLC). Young African Leaders Initiative (YALI) is an initiative of the United States Department of State. YALI started in 2010 by President Barack Obama. YALI is a programme aimed at educating and networking young African leaders regionally, which started in 2014. YALI RLC West Africa was one of the four regional "leadership centers" Ghana, West Africa. The centre at Ghana, is located at Ghana Institute of Management and Public Administration (GIMPA). The West Africa centres carry out training which aims at millennials within west African region. Participants of the Regional Leadership Centres go through online and in-person training and are provided with professional development opportunities in these three track areas; business and entrepreneurship, civil society management and public policy and management.

According to USAID, a sum of $38,770,950.00 is Total Lifetime Investment support for the project; USG Investment $12,500,000.00; Non-USG Investment $26,270,950.00

== Activities within West Africa ==
"YALI RLC West Africa, Accra was developed in order to provide a platform for the next potential generation of Africa’s leaders to come together and prepare for future endeavours that will effect change and ultimately transform the continent."

According to the former President of the United States, Barack Obama:

"You will not only be making a difference in your own countries but also be the foundation of a new generation of global leadership".

The implementing organisation carry out training of African leaders. In 2017, YALI RLC West Africa held its first alumni conference at Ghana Institute of Management and Public Administration (GIMPA), Accra, Ghana. In 2018, YALI RLC in Lagos, Nigeria had 127 participants.

== Organisation and Partnership ==
The organisation comprises the YALI Regional Leadership Center (RLC) Director, the Deputy Rector of the Ghana Institute of Management, and the RLC Governing Council.

Ghana Institute of Management and Public Administration (GIMPA) serves as the implementing partner along with other resources partners which are namely:

- Higher education Institutions
- Non-governmental organizations
- Private Organizations
- Private Businesses
- Private Philanthropies
- McKinsey and Company
- Microsoft
- Cisco Systems
- Intel
- IBM
- Atlas Mara

== Other RLC locations ==
The Regional Leadership Center West Africa centers are also at:

- Ghana Institute of Management and Public Administration (GIMPA), Accra, Ghana
- Centre Africain d’Etudes Supérieures en Gestion (CESAG), Dakar, Senegal
- Administrative Staff College of Nigeria (ASCON), Lagos, Nigeria
