= Josephine Oluseyi Williams =

Nigerian financial expert

Lagos State Head of Service
- In office October 2013 – February 2015
- Preceded by: Adesegun Olusola Ogunlewe
- Succeeded by: Folashade Sherifat Jaji

Permanent Secretary, Lagos State Ministry of Finance
- In office May 2010 – October 2013

Personal details
- Born: 3 April 1956 (age 70) Lagos State, Nigeria
- Party: Non-partisian

Josephine Oluseyi Williams (born 3 April 1956) is a Nigerian financial expert, Public administrator and former Lagos State Head of Service.

== Early life ==
Josephine was born in Lagos State, southwestern Nigeria. She attended the University of Lagos where she received a bachelor's degree in accounting and a post graduate diploma in computer science.

== Civil service ==
She joined the Nigerian Civil Service on February 15, 1980, as an accountant after she completed the compulsory one-year Youth Service. After she spent five years at the Federal Housing Authority, she joined the Lagos State Civil Service as Chief Accountant before she got a transfer to the Lagos State Ministry of Physical Planning and Urban as Director of Accounts. In June 1994, she was appointed Auditor-General and in 1995, she became the State Accountant-General. In February 2006, she was appointed as Permanent Secretary, Lagos State Ministry of Finance, a position she held until her appointment as Head of Service in October 2013 to succeed Adesegun Olusola Ogunlewe. She retired in February 2015 at the age of 60 years after 34 years of service and was succeeded by Folashade Sherifat Jaji, whose appointment was confirmed on February 17, 2015, by the State Governor, Babatunde Fashola.
