= Nure Ayinde Akinsanya =

Nigerian politician

Hon. Nureni Ayinde Akinsanya

Member, Lagos State House of Assembly
- Incumbent
- Assumed office 2019
- Constituency: Mushin Constituency I

Personal details
- Born: May 19, 1967 (age 58) Lagos State, Nigeria
- Party: All Progressives Congress (APC)
- Education: Olabisi Onabanjo University; Ladoke Akintola University of Technology
- Occupation: Politician, Real Estate Developer
- Website: Lagos Assembly Profile

Nureni Ayinde Akinsanya (born 19 May 1967), popularly known as Osmak, is a Nigerian real estate developer and politician who currently serves as a member of the Lagos State House of Assembly, representing Mushin Constituency I under the platform of the All Progressives Congress (APC).

== Early life and education ==
Nureni Akinsanya was born on May 19, 1967, in Lagos State. He began his primary education at Shamusideen Islamic School, Ojuelegba, graduating in 1978. He proceeded to Eko Boys High School, Mushin, for his secondary education, where he obtained his West African School Certificate (WASC) in 1986.

He holds a Higher Diploma in Business Administration (2010) and a Professional Postgraduate Diploma in Business Administration (2017) from Olabisi Onabanjo University. In 2023, he obtained a Master of Business Administration (MBA) in Human Resource Management from Ladoke Akintola University of Technology (LAUTECH).

== Career ==
=== Private sector ===
Before entering full-time politics, Akinsanya was a prominent figure in the real estate sector. He served as the Chairman of Osmak Hotel Limited and Osmak Ventures Limited, a property development firm. He also served as the Chairman of the Association of Real Estate Developers of Lagos State (AREDOLS) from 2011 to 2019.

=== Political career ===
Akinsanya's political career began at the grassroots level in Mushin. He served as an elected Councilor for Ward B1 (1999–2002) and later for Ward C (2004–2007) under the Mushin Local Government.

In 2019, he was elected to the Lagos State House of Assembly to represent Mushin Constituency I. He was re-elected in the 2023 general elections.
