= Anyim Pius Anyim =

Nigerian politician (born 1961)

Anyim Pius Anyim GCON
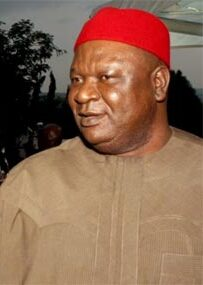

Secretary to the Government of the Federation
- In office 29 May 2011 – 29 May 2015
- President: Goodluck Jonathan
- Preceded by: Yayale Ahmed
- Succeeded by: Babachir David Lawal

9th President of the Nigerian Senate
- In office 8 August 2000 – 3 June 2003
- Deputy: Ibrahim Mantu
- Preceded by: Chuba Okadigbo
- Succeeded by: Adolphus Wabara

Senator for Ebonyi South
- In office 3 June 1999 – 3 June 2003
- Preceded by: Office established
- Succeeded by: Emmanuel Azu Agboti

Personal details
- Born: Anyim Pius Anyim; 19 February 1961 (age 65) Ishiagu, Eastern Region, Nigeria (now in Ebonyi State)
- Party: All Progressives Congress (2024-Present)
- Education: Imo State University
- Occupation: Politician; lawyer

Anyim Pius Anyim GCON (born 19 February 1961) is a Nigerian politician who served as the 9th president of the Nigerian Senate from 2000 to 2003, he was Secretary to the Government of the Federation (SGF) during the Goodluck Jonathan presidency. He was elected Senator on the platform of the Peoples Democratic Party (PDP) in 1999 for the Ebonyi South constituency of Ebonyi State and was elected president of the Senate in August 2000.

== Background ==
Anyim was born on 19 February 1961 in Ishiagu, a dominantly Catholic community in the Ivo Local Government Area of Ebonyi State He attended Ishiagu High School (St. John Bosco), the Federal School of Arts and Science, Aba and later, Imo State University, Uturu (1983–1987). For his Youth Service, he served as the Co-ordinator, Youth Mobilisation Programme in Sokoto State. In 1992, Anyim became the Head of Protection Department at the National Commission for Refugees, Abuja, a job that included provision of legal services and political protection for refugees. In this capacity, he travelled to various parts of the world.

In 1998, Anyim joined the United Nigeria Congress Party (UNCP) and won a Senate election. However, the death of General Sani Abacha on 8 June 1998 nullified the result. During the transitional regime of General Abdulsalami Abubakar, he joined the People's Democratic Party (PDP) and again ran successfully for election to the Senate in 1999.

== Senate career ==
Anyim was elected into the Nigerian Senate in May 1999, and was subsequently voted by colleagues as President of the Senate in August 2000, after Chuba Okadigbo had been impeached, holding office until May 2003.

In May 2001, Anyim declared that the upper legislative house was justified in probing the activities of the Mines and Power Ministry during the tenure of Chief Bola Ige. In June 2002, an attempt led by Anyim to impeach President Olusegun Obasanjo collapsed. Speaking a year later, Anyim said President Olusegun Obasanjo misunderstood him on certain issues but there was no conflict between them. In August 2002, he said he was opposed to all the present office holders - including himself - going for a second term.

In November 2002, Anyim indefinitely suspended Senator Arthur Nzeribe of Imo State due to an allegation of a N22 million fraud. Nzeribe was said to be planning an impeachment motion against Anyim. The same month, after Anyim had complained about the Independent Corruption Practices and Other Related Offences Commission (ICPC), the Senate set up a committee to examine the continued relevance of the commission. In May 2003, Anyim warned an Abuja High Court judge, Justice Egbo Egbo, that the parliament had the power to order his arrest over his opposition to the passage of the anti-graft ICPC law by the Senate.

== Later career ==
Anyim did not seek reelection in 2003, knowing full well that under Obasanjo's watch, he would lose and lose his deposit in the process. Therefore, instead of contesting, he mobilised resources for ANPP candidates in Ebonyi State to challenge his party. Sometime after leaving office, his private house in Abuja was partially pulled down for violating the Abuja master plan. As a Senate President, Senator Anyim fought the sitting Governor of Ebonyi State, Samuel Ominyi Egwu, to a standstill and Anyim's village boiled. The conflict between the duo was so primitive that Anyim's mock coffin was allegedly paraded around Abakaliki, the state capital.

As SGF, there was a palpable uneasy relationship between Anyim and the Governor of Ebonyi State, Martin Elechi. Anyim's village was boiling, with several indigenes in exile. He was appointed by the Nigerian President, Goodluck Jonathan to head the Centenary celebration of the proclamation of Nigeria as a nation by colonial Britain.

Anyim was a candidate in the elections for Chairmanship of the PDP in January 2008. In November 2007, the chairman of the Kaduna State chapter of the PDP said he would receive the votes of the entire Kaduna State delegation to the convention. In January 2008, the League of Patriotic Lawyers supported his candidature. He also gained support from the Peoples Democratic Party Youth Forum. However, in the end Prince Vincent Ogbulafor was appointed PDP chairman.

In January 2010, he led a delegation of 41 eminent Nigerians that called on President Umaru Yar'Adua to urgently transmit a letter of his incapacitation to the National Assembly to salvage the nation's democracy from danger. He praised the Senate when they passed a resolution on 9 February 2010 to make Vice President Goodluck Jonathan Acting President. In May 2011, Pius Anyim was appointed as Secretary to the Government of the Federation (SGF).

== Awards ==
- Grand Commander of the Order of the Niger (GCON)

== See also ==
- List of people from Ebonyi State
