= Archdeacon Crowther Memorial Girls' School =

Location
- School Road; Elelenwo, Port Harcourt, Rivers State; Nigeria; 4°50′48″N 7°4′17″E

Information
- Type: Independent, All-Girls
- Denomination: Anglican
- Established: 1943
- Principal: Chinyere Uchenna Ordu
- Gender: Female
- Nickname: Greenheads
- Website: acmgselelenwo.org

Archdeacon Crowther Memorial Girls' School is a secondary school located in Elelenwo, Port Harcourt, Rivers State.

== Notable alumni ==
- Monalisa Chinda, actress
- Ebele Ofunneamaka Okeke, civil engineer
