= Boss Mustapha =

Nigerian lawyer and politician (born 1956)

Boss Mustapha CFR

Secretary to the Government of the Federation
- In office 1 November 2017 – 29 May 2023
- President: Muhammadu Buhari
- Preceded by: Babachir David Lawal
- Succeeded by: George Akume

Chairman of the Presidential Task Force on COVID-19
- In office 17 March 2020 – 29 May 2023
- President: Muhammadu Buhari

Managing Director of Nigeria Inland Waterways Authority
- In office 23 June 2016 – 30 October 2017

Personal details
- Born: Boss Gidahyelda Mustapha; 1956 (age 69–70) Hong, Northern Region, British Nigeria (now in Adamawa State, Nigeria)
- Party: All Progressives Congress (2013–present)
- Other political affiliations: Peoples Democratic Party (1998–2006); Action Congress (2006–2013)
- Spouse: Olufunmilayo Mustapha
- Education: Ahmadu Bello University
- Occupation: Politician; lawyer

Boss Mustapha CFR (born 1956) is a Nigerian lawyer and politician who served as Secretary to the Government of the Federation (SGF) of Nigeria from 2017 to 2023, and Chairman of the Presidential Task Force on COVID-19.

He was previously managing director of Nigerian Inland Waterways Authority until his appointment to replace Babachir David Lawal as SGF by President Muhammad Buhari on 30 October 2017.

== Background ==
Mustapha was born in 1956 in Garaha, a village located in Hong Local Government Area of Adamawa State in the North Eastern. Mustapha attended primary school in Hong, Adamawa and proceeded to North East College of Arts and Sciences in Maiduguri, Borno State for his high school education. He graduated in 1976. He attended Ahmadu Bello University in Zaria where he received Bachelor of Law (LL.B) in 1979. He proceeded to Nigeria Law School, Lagos for mandatory one-year law class and graduated in 1980. He was called to Nigerian Bar in the same year. He did his one-year mandatory national service between 1980 and 1981.

Mustapha started his legal practice in Messrs Onagoruwa & Co in Lagos as a Counsel in 1983. He had a stint at an Italian consultancy firm Sotesa Nigeria Limited earlier. In 1994 he stablished his own law practice firm Messrs Mustapha & Associates and served as its Principal Counsel until 2000. He later worked in another law firm Adriot Lex & Co. serving as Principal Consultant from 2000 to 2006. Mustapha has served as a member of several boards of companies in the manufacturing, financial services and oil and gas sectors – he has been described as a "boardroam guru".

== Early political career ==
Mustapha entered politics in the 1980s after law graduation. Between 1988 and 1989 he was a member of the Constituent Assembly, the body that drafted the Constitution of the Third Nigerian Republic. In 1989, Mustapha was the state chairman of the Peoples Solidarity Party (PSP) in defunct Gongola State but the party was among the several political parties disbanded by military head of state General Ibrahim Babangida. Between 1990 and 1991, Mustapha was Adamawa state chairman of the Social Democratic Party, one of the two state-created political parties during the military regime. He ran unsuccessfully for Adamawa State governorship in 1991 under the party but lost to Abubakar Saleh Michika of National Republican Convention.

In 2000, Mustapha was a member of the presidential committee tasked by President Olusegun Obasanjo to investigate the activities of the Petroleum Trust Fund under Muhammadu Buhari. Buhari resigned his position as executive chairman of the body earlier. The committee, Interim Management Committee, did their work but the report was never made public. Mustapha served as the deputy director-general to the presidential campaign of then Vice President Atiku Abubakar's during the 2007 presidential election.

Mustapha was deputy national chairman of the Action Congress of Nigeria. The party was among the 3 major parties that were merged to form the All Progressives Congress on 6 February 2013 in anticipation of the Nigeria's 2015 general elections. In 2014, after merger of their party he Mustapha ran unsuccessfully for Governor of Adamawa State. He later served in the presidential campaigns and was among the members of its transition committee in Nigeria's 2015 election that brought Muhammadu Buhari into power. He is also a member of the board of trustees of the party.

== Secretary to the Government of the Federation ==
Mustapha was appointed Secretary to the Government of the Federation on 30 October 2017 following sack of Babachir David Lawal who has been on suspension six months earlier for misappropriating public funds. He took oath of office on 1 November 2017 during a meeting of the Federal Executive Council, in the Council Chambers, Presidential Villa, Abuja.

=== Coronavirus pandemic ===
On 9 March, the President Muhammadu Buhari established a Presidential Task Force for the control of the virus in the country. SGF Boss Mustapha was appointed Chairman of the twelve member task force, since then the task force has held daily briefings.

== Membership ==
He is a member of several professional bodies including:

- African Bar Association
- Commonwealth Lawyers Association
- International Bar Association
- Human Rights Institute

== Awards and recognition ==
In October 2022, President Muhammadu Buhari conferred on Mustapha a national honour of Commander of the Order of the Federal Republic (CFR).
