= Ebele Ofunneamaka Okeke =

Nigerian civil engineer (born 1948

Head of Nigerian Civil Service
- In office July 2007 – July 2008
- President: Umaru Yar'Adua
- Preceded by: Mahmud Yayale Ahmed

Permanent Secretary, Federal Ministry of Water Resources
- In office March 2005 – July 2007
- President: Olusegun Obasanjo

Personal details
- Born: 14 June 1948 (age 78) Nnewi North, Anambra State, Nigeria
- Relations: Ifeyinwa Morris (Sister), Chief J.C Okeke (Father), Nonyelum Okeke (Mother), Nonny Egbuna (Sister), Chuka Okeke (Brother), Ogo Okeke (Sister), Alex Okeke (Brother)
- Children: Adamara Okeke
- Education: University of Southampton, England
- Occupation: Civil servant (Rtd)

Ebele Ofunneamaka Okeke // CFR and OON (Born 14, June 1948) is a Nigerian civil engineer and former Head of Nigerian Civil Service.

== Life and career ==
She was born on 14 June 1948 at Nnewi North, Anambra State, Nigeria. She had her secondary education at Archdeacon Crowther Memorial Girls' School Elelenwo, Port Harcourt, where she obtained the West African School Certificate (WASC) in 1965. She proceeded to the University of Southampton, England where she obtained a Bachelor of Science (B.Sc.) in civil engineering (1971). She holds a Post Graduate Diploma (PGD) in ground water from Loughborough University. She also obtained a Post Graduate Degree (PGD) in Hydrology and Hydrogeology from the University College London in 1979. She then returned to Nigeria to obtain a Master of Business Administration, MBA degree from the University of Nigeria, Nsukka in 2001. In March 2007, she became the Permanent Secretary of the Federal Ministry of Water Resources and after months of service, she became the Head of Nigerian Civil Service, making her the first female to serve in that capacity from the history of Nigeria. She held this position until 2008, when she finally retired from the Nigerian Civil Service. She is one of the Nigerian civil engineers who have contributed tremendously to engineering development in Nigeria. She founded the Abuja Chapter of the Association of Professional Women Engineers of Nigeria (APWEN). She was one of the six delegates that represented the retired civil servants at the 2014 Nigeria's National Conference.

== Awards and honours ==
She is a receiver of honours and award, which include:

- CFR (2006)
- OON

== Fellowships ==
- Fellow and Chartered Civil Engineer of the Institution of Civil Engineers of Great Britain and Ireland
- Fellow of the Nigeria Society of Engineers.
- Member of Council for the Regulation of Engineering in Nigeria (COREN)

== See also ==
- Yayale Ahmed
