= UNIOSUN Teaching Hospital =

Geography
- Location: Osogbo, Osun State, Southwest, Osun State, Nigeria
- Coordinates: 7.870750721858469°N 4.569929951847904°E

Organisation
- Type: Teaching, Research

Services
- Emergency department: Yes

Links
- Website: www.https://uth-osogbo.org.ng/
- Lists: Hospitals in Nigeria

UNIOSUN Teaching Hospital (formerly known as LAUTECH teaching hospital) is a state owned medical teaching hospital located in Osogbo, Osun State, Nigeria to provide tertiary health care and support undergraduate medical students from Osun State University.

== CMD ==
The Governor of Osun State, Senator Ademola Nurudeen Jackson Adeleke, appointed Dr. Afolabi Babatunde Adeola as the Chief Medical Director of Uniosun Teaching Hospital, Osogbo. Dr. Afolabi was selected following a competitive screening process involving nine applicants, conducted by a panel appointed by the state government.

Dr. Afolabi, a medical practitioner and entrepreneur, was born on December 22, 1972, in Inisha, Osun State. He obtained his medical degree from the University of Ilorin and completed his residency at LAUTECH Teaching Hospital, Osogbo. He has held multiple leadership positions within Uniosun Teaching Hospital, including Head of the Department of Family Medicine and Chairman of the Medical Advisory Committee.

== Departments ==
=== Clinical Departments ===
- Chemical Pathology
- Community Medicine
- Dental Care
- Ear, Nose and Throat
- Paediatrics
- Psychiatry
- Radiology
- Renal
- Surgery
- Theatre
- Accident and Emergency
- Anaesthesia
- Family Medicine
- Haematology
- Histopathology
- Internal Medicine
- Microbiology
- NHIS/OYSHIA
- Obstetrics and Gynaecology
- Ophthalmology

=== Non Clinical Departments ===
- Medical Library
- Nursing
- Pharmacy
- Physiotherapy
- Social Works
- Dietetics
- Ethical Review/ Research/ Training
- Health Information Management
- Infection Control

=== Administrative Departments ===
- Account/ Finance
- Central admin
- Public Relations
- Security
- Stores & Purchase
- Transport
- Corporate Planning & Training Services
- Establishment/ Personnel
- Laundry/ Tailoring
- Management Information System
- Pensions/ Welfare

Works & Maintenance
