= Akinsanya Sunny Ajose =

Nigerian politician

2nd Lagos State Head of Service
- In office July 2004 – February 2006
- Governor: Bola Tinubu

Personal details
- Born: 10 February 1946 Badagry, Lagos State, Nigeria
- Died: 16 January 2025 (aged 78)
- Party: All Progressives Congress
- Education: Kennedy–King College; University of Illinois; Governors State University

Akinsanya Sunny Ajose (born 10 February 1946) is a Nigerian politician and public administrator. He served as Lagos State Head of Service from July 2004 to February 2006. Chief Ajose died early on Thursday, January 16, 2025. He was 78.

== Early life and education ==
Akinsanya was born in Badagry, a town and local government area of Lagos State, South-Western Nigeria. His educational background started in 1954 when he enrolled as a pupil at Ijaiye Baptist Day School but he completed his primary school education at Tinubu Methodist Day School in 1959 and subsequently completed his secondary school education at Badagry Divisional Grammar School in 1964.

Akinsanya received a bachelor’s degree from the University of Illinois, Chicago in1973 after studying Liberal Arts and Science majoring in Political Science. In 1974, he obtained his M.A in Social Science from Governors State University.

== Career ==
Prior to his employment as a civil servant, Ajose had previously worked as Personnel Programmes Administrator with IBM Nigeria Ltd from 1975 to 1978. In June 1979, he got employed as an Administrative Officer Grade VI after his deployment to the Civil Service Commission by the Lagos State Government. In 2004, Ajose was appointed by Bola Tinubu as Lagos State Head of Service till February 2006 when he attained the statutory retirement age.

In 2006, Bola Tinubu reappointed Akinsanya Sunny Ajose to serve as his Special Adviser until May 2007 when his tenure elapsed as governor of Lagos State. Akinsanya Ajose was a member of the Lagos State University Governing Council since September 16, 2015.

== Awards and recognitions ==
- Officer of the Order of the Niger – 2014
