= Odunola Abayomi =

Nigerian entrepreneur

- Born: Odunola Abayomi; 17 April 1990 (age 36); Ibadan, Nigeria
- Education: Ladoke Akintola University of Technology
- Occupations: Entrepreneur; brand and media consultant; TV presenter
- Known for: The TOD Show

Odunola Abayomi (born 17 April 1990) is a Nigerian serial entrepreneur, business coach, brand and media consultant and TV presenter. She is the host of The TOD Show, which has been aired on WAP TV and MYTV.

She emerged as Eko Fastest Growing Entrepreneur of the Year at the Eko Heritage Awards in 2023. She is also a recipient of the Maya Awards, at which she emerged as CEO of the Year; she is also a honouree at the Lagos Achievers' Awards.

== Background and education ==
Odunola hails from Yagba West local government area in Kogi state, but she grew up in Ibadan.

For her elementary education, she attended Richmab International Nursery and Primary School, Ibadan, Oyo State. She proceeded to Queen's School, at which she completed her secondary education. She later obtained a degree in Electrical and Electronics Engineering from the Ladoke Akintola University of Technology.

She also has a HSE certification from the Institute of Safety Professionals of Nigeria.

== Career ==
Odunola developed a passion for photography during her involvement in the National Youth Service Corps (NYSC) scheme in 2015 in Plateau State. Immediately after NYSC, she went for photography training in Lagos, and thereafter started her photography business. She later expanded into advertising, branding services, consulting and creative directing. She has twice been a juror in the Wikipedia competition for photographers in Africa.

In 2020, Odunola launched The TOD show, a television show that showcases successful businesses and outstanding personalities from various sectors, and how they have contributed to the Nigerian economy and inspire humanity; the programme is being aired on WAP TV, a channel on DSTV, GOTV and StarTimes.

In 2021, she founded 9'oclock_ng, an event blogging platform that deals with publicity for events.

In 2022, Odunola started a non-governmental, not-for-profit initiative called "Give Back with T'Odunola", which is aimed at helping less privileged and rural communities through donations of books and other materials sourced from urban communities. In accordance with SDGs 1, 4, 7 and 11, she has proven that transformation of our world lies within us individually and collectively.

She belongs to several communities and associations, among which include Toastmasters International, Junior Chamber International (JCI), Rotary Club and Techmentors.

== Awards and recognitions ==
Year	Award	Category	Result
2022	Lagos Achievers' Awards	Honouree	Won
2022	Maya Awards	CEO of the Year	Won
2023	Eko Heritage Awards	Fastest Growing Entrepreneur of the Year	Won
