= Babachir Lawal =

Nigerian engineer and politician (born 1954)

Secretary to the Government of the Federation
- In office 27 August 2015 – 30 October 2017; *Suspended from 19 April 2017
- President: Muhammadu Buhari
- Preceded by: Anyim Pius Anyim
- Succeeded by: Boss Gida Mustapha

Personal details
- Born: 2 October 1954 (age 72) Kwambla, Hong, Northern Region, British Nigeria (now in Adamawa State, Nigeria)
- Education: Ahmadu Bello University, Zaria
- Occupation: Politician
- Profession: Engineer

Babachir David Lawal (born 2 October 1954) is a Nigerian politician who was Secretary to the Government of the Federation from 2015 to 2017. He was appointed on 27 August 2015, by President Muhammadu Buhari. Lawal was suspended as Secretary to Government of Federation (SGF) by President Buhari on 19 April 2017, and was officially relieved of all duties on 30 October 2017 for misappropriating funds intended for alleviating the food crisis in Nigeria's Northeast, caused largely by Boko Haram.

== Early life and education ==
Lawal completed his primary education at St. Patrick's Primary School, Maiduguri in 1969 and proceeded to the Nigeria Military School Zaria, from 1970 – 1974 for his secondary education. He then attended the School of Basic Studies, Ahmadu Bello University (ABU), Zaria from 1974 to 1975.

Lawal studied Electrical Engineering at Ahmadu Bello University, Zaria where he graduated in 1979 with a Bachelor of Engineering (Electrical).

== Career ==
Lawal began his career in Delta Steel Company, Ovwian-Aladja where he rose to the position of Senior Engineer, this was from 1979 to 1984. He later worked at Nigerian External Telecommunications Ltd, Lagos as a Principal Engineer from 1984 to 1986. He was at Data Sciences Nigeria Ltd, from 1986 to 1989, where he attained the position of Regional Manager.

Lawal established his own company Rholavision Engineering Ltd, Kaduna in 1990. He ran his own company successfully until he was appointed the Secretary to the Government of the Federation on the 27th of August, 2015.

He is also a member of the Nigeria Computer Society, the Nigeria Society of Engineers and the Council for the Regulation of Engineering in Nigeria.

== Politics ==
Lawal joined active politics in 2002 through the membership of All Nigeria Peoples Party (ANPP). Lawal held many offices in the ANPP and also in Buhari's campaign team including as Deputy Coordinator, The Buhari Campaign Organisation in Adamawa State. Political offices held: State Deputy Coordinator, The Buhari Campaign Organisation, Adamawa State (2002 – 2005). State Coordinator, The Buhari Campaign Organisation, Adamawa State, (2005 – 2010). Member, Congress For Progressive Change National Contact and Mobilization Committee (2010 – 2013) iv. Member, Congress For Progressive Change Renewal Committee, 2012. Member, All Progressive Congress Merger Committee, 2013. Ex-Officious Member, All Progressives Congress Interim Management Committee (2013 – 2014). Member, APC Presidential Campaign Committee, 2015.

On 30 October 2017, he was sacked as Secretary to Government of Federation following a report into his alleged involvement in diverting crisis relief funds.
