= Abdullahi Saleh Usman =

Nigerian Islamic cleric and public servant

Professor Abdullahi Saleh Usman

Executive Chairman of the National Hajj Commission of Nigeria
- Incumbent
- Assumed office 19 August 2024
- President: Bola Ahmed Tinubu
- Preceded by: Zikrullah Kunle Hassan
- Succeeded by: Amb Ismail Yusuf

Personal details
- Born: 1957 (age 68–69) Mai'Adua, Katsina State, Nigeria
- Education: Islamic University of Madinah; University of Peshawar; Usmanu Danfodiyo University, Sokoto
- Profession: Professor, Islamic scholar, civil servant

Sheikh Abdullahi Saleh Pakistan is a Nigerian Islamic cleric and public servant. He served as the Chairman of the National Hajj Commission of Nigeria (NAHCON) from October 2024 to February 2026. He has been involved in Hajj operations and administration at the national level. He is popularly known as Pakistan due to his early Islamic education in Pakistan.
