= National Hajj Commission of Nigeria =

Government agency in Nigeria

Agency overview
- Formed: 2006
- Preceding agency: Directorate of Pilgrims Affairs
- Jurisdiction: Federal Government of Nigeria
- Headquarters: Abuja, Nigeria
- Parent department: Office of the Secretary to the Government of the Federation
- Website: nahcon.gov.ng

The National Hajj Commission of Nigeria (NAHCON) is a government agency responsible for managing Hajj operations for Nigerian Muslim pilgrims formed in 2006.

== History ==
The Nigerian government's official involvement in Hajj operations began in 1953, when Alhaji Abubakar Imam moved a motion in the Northern House of Assembly calling for the creation of a Nigerian pilgrims’ office in Jeddah, Saudi Arabia, to assist Nigerian pilgrims facing hardship abroad. As pilgrim numbers increased in the 1960s and 1970s, various regional Pilgrims Welfare Boards were established. In order to centralize and professionalize Hajj operations, the Federal Government established the Nigerian Pilgrims Board in 1975 via Decree No. 16. This was later replaced in 1989 by the Nigerian Pilgrims Commission, which was dissolved in 1991 after a tragic airline crash in Jiddah that killed 247 Nigerian pilgrims and 14 crew members on board. The failure of temporary structures like task forces, and the Saudi government's ban on Nigerian pilgrims in 1996, further underscored the need for a permanent, professional institution.

The National Hajj Commission of Nigeria (NAHCON) was established in 2006 by an Act of the National Assembly the NAHCON (Establishment) Act, 2006 to oversee, regulate, and coordinate Hajj and Umrah activities in Nigeria. It was created in response to decades of administrative instability in Hajj operations, including multiple institutional failures such as the Nigerian Pilgrims Board, the Nigerian Pilgrims Commission, and the Directorate of Pilgrims Affairs. NAHCON officially began operations in 2007, with its first chairman, Muhammad Musa Bello, later appointed as Nigeria’s Minister of the Federal Capital Territory. Since then, the Commission has served as the federal regulatory body responsible for:

- Coordinating state pilgrims welfare boards
- Supervising Hajj logistics, including airlift and accommodation
- Ensuring compliance with Saudi Arabian Hajj regulations
- Managing pilgrim welfare and registration

== NAHCON Chairmen ==
Chairmen of the National Hajj Commission of Nigeria (NAHCON) since 2006
No.	Name	Tenure	Remarks
1	Muhammad Musa Bello	2006 – 2015	Pioneer chairman; later became Minister of the Federal Capital Territory (FCT).
2	Abdullahi Mukhtar Muhammad	2015 – 2019	Former Executive Secretary, Kaduna State Pilgrims Board.
3	Zikrullah Kunle Hassan	2019 – 2023	First Southern Muslim to lead NAHCON; confirmed in January 2020.
4	Jalal Ahmad Arabi	2023 – 2024 (Acting)	Oversaw the 2024 Hajj as Acting Chairman.
5	Prof. Saleh Abdullahi Usman	2024 – 10 February 2026	Former Chairman; confirmed by the Senate in October 2024.
6	Amb. Ismail Abba Yusuf	2026 – present	Served as ambassador to the Republic of Türkiye from 2021 to 2024.
