= Lagos State Head of Service =

Government office

The Lagos State Head of Service is the highest rank of the Lagos State Civil Service. The appointment is often confirmed by the Governor of Lagos State subject to the approval of the State House of Assembly. The appointment is often based on the years of experience and services at the State Civil Service and preferably, a serving permanent secretary. The position was formerly combined with the Secretary to the State Government during the Military regime and the appointed civil servant automatically becomes the Deputy Governor of the state but the offices were separated in 1999.

== Heads of service ==
- Babatunde Tajudeen Rotinwa
- Balogun Yakub Abiodun
- Rafiu Babatunde Tinubu
- Akinsanya Sunny Ajose
- Adesegun Olusola Ogunlewe
- Josephine Oluseyi Williams
- Folashade Sherifat Jaji
- Olabowale Ademola
- Folashade Adesoye
- Hakeem Muri-Okunola
- Bode Agoro
