= Yayale Ahmed =

Nigerian civil servant and politician

Salihu Muhammad
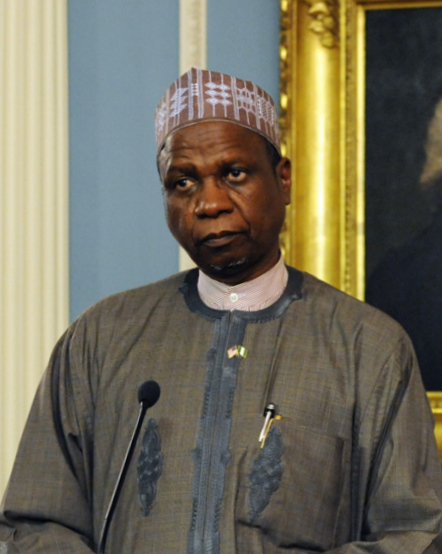
- Yayale Ahmed in 2010

Secretary to the Government of the Federation
- In office 8 September 2008 – May 2011
- President: Umaru Musa Yar'Adua; Goodluck Jonathan
- Preceded by: Baba Gana Kingibe
- Succeeded by: Anyim Pius Anyim

Minister of Defence
- In office 26 July 2007 – 8 September 2008
- President: Umaru Musa Yar'Adua
- Preceded by: Rabiu Kwankwaso
- Succeeded by: Shettima Mustapha

Head of Civil Service of the Federation
- In office 18 December 2000 – 26 July 2007
- President: Olusegun Obasanjo; Umaru Musa Yar'Adua
- Succeeded by: Ebele Ofunneamaka Okeke

Personal details
- Born: 15 April 1952 (age 74) Shira, Azare, Bauchi State, Nigeria
- Children: Seven
- Education: Ahmadu Bello University
- Occupation: Civil servant, politician
- Awards: Order of the Federal Republic

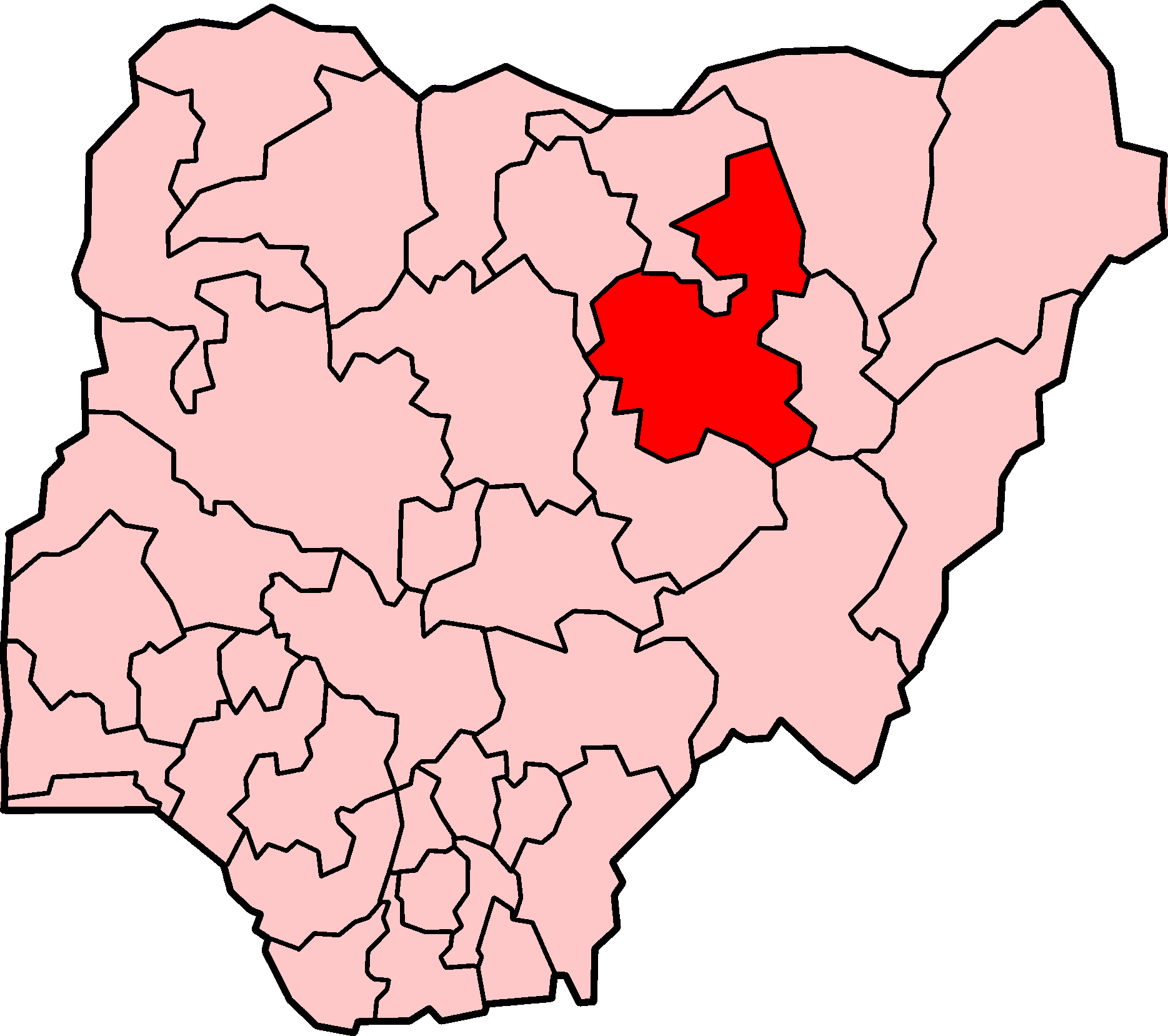
Location of Bauchi State in Nigeria

Mahmud Yayale Ahmed, CFR (born 15 April 1952) is a Nigerian civil servant and politician who served as Defence Minister of Nigeria.

== Early life and education ==
Ahmed was born in the town of Shira in southern Azare, Bauchi State, to Ahmadu, an Islamic scholar and farmer. He attended Shira Primary School, Government Secondary School Azare, and then Ahmadu Bello University (ABU) in Zaria, Kaduna State, where he received a bachelor's degree in Political Science in 1976 and a master's degree in Public Administration in 1981. He completed his National Youth Service Corps (NYSC) service in 1977.

He has an honorary Doctorate Degree in Law awarded by the University of Abuja and an honorary Doctorate Degree of Letters by Bayero University.

== Civil service and politics ==
Ahmed joined the Bauchi State Civil Service in 1977. In 1982, he became deputy secretary to the state's Ministry of Animal Health and Forestry Resources, and the next year, in 1983, he became acting permanent secretary to the Ministry of Rural Development and Cooperatives.

In 1986, he joined the federal government's civil service, holding various positions in the Ministries of Internal Affairs and of Education. He was a member of the 1988 Ministerial Committee on the Civil Service Reforms.

Ahmed was appointed to the position of Head of Civil Service of the Federation on December 18, 2000, by former President Olusegun Obasanjo, who described Ahmed as "Mr Civil Servant".

In May 2006, Yayale considered running for Governor or Bauchi State in the 2007 general election. According to Yahuza Bauchi, the people of Bauchi State were "clamouring for Alhaji Yayale Ahmed to assume the mantle of leadership in the state so as to consolidate the good works of Governor Adamu Mua'zu."

President Umaru Yar'Adua appointed him to the position of Defence Minister on July 26, 2007. He had no military experience prior to the appointment. On September 8, 2008, President Umaru Yar'Adua appointed him as the Secretary to the Government of the Federation (SGF) replacing Babagana Kingibe. In May 2011, President Goodluck Jonathan replaced Ahmed with Senator Anyi Pius Anyim.

On August 31, 2024, he became chairman of the Committee of Pro-Chancellors of Nigerian Federal Universities (CPCNFU).

== Awards and honours ==
He was decorated with the national honour of Commander of the Order of the Federal Republic (CFR).

== Personal life ==
Ahmed is married with seven children. He speaks Hausa, Fulani, and English. He has 7 children, Khadija, Nabil, Halima, Ibrahim, Usman, Sagir and Nabila.

== Titles ==
Ahmed is the Ajiyan Katagum, a Katagum Emirate position, and the Akowojo of Idanre Kingdom, in Ondo State.
