= Samson Abioye =

Nigerian computer programmer (1991–2017)

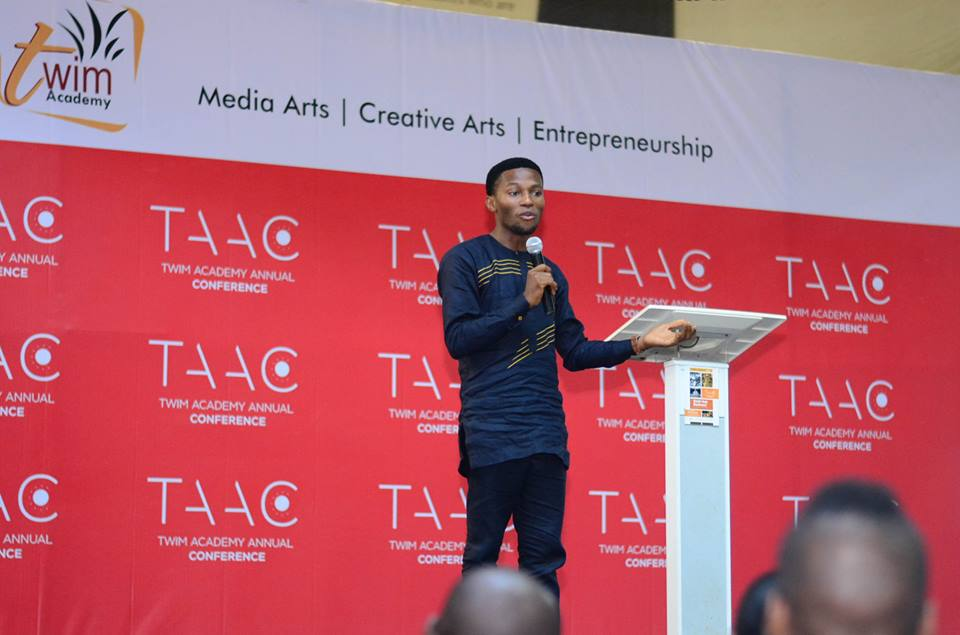
- Born: 25 March 1991
- Died: 28 July 2017 (aged 26)
- Citizenship: Nigeria
- Education: Ladoke Akintola University (Ba.Computer Engineering)
- Occupations: computer programmer; entrepreneur
- Notable work: founder Pass.ng

Samson Abioye (25 March 1991 – 28 July 2017) was a Nigerian computer programmer and internet entrepreneur. In 2013, he co-founded pass.ng, a self-testing online platform which helps students practice for national examinations, while studying at Ladoke Akintola University as an undergraduate. Until his death, he operated as pass.ng's CEO. The platform was one of the largest e-testing platforms, designed to help students prepare for important examinations such as WASSCE, GCE, UTME, Common Entrance and aptitude tests.

== Early life and education ==
Abioye hailed from Oyo state. He earned a degree in Computer Engineering from Ladoke Akintola University of Technology in 2014.

== Career ==
He worked temporarily with his University's ICT department while studying before co-founding pass.ng which won the Airtel Catapult-a-Startup competition in 2014. He was also the winner of the 2013 National Best Developer for Computer Science students in Nigeria as an undergraduate.

== Death ==
Abioye passed on in the morning of 28 July 2017. Pulse Nigeria described his death as "one that has shocked the sphere of technology in Nigeria". According to the news outlet Kemi Filani, he was reported to have slumped and died.

== See also ==
- Keneddy Ekezie
