= Folashade Yemi-Esan =

Nigerian head of service (born 1964)

Head of the Nigerian Civil Service
- Incumbent
- Assumed office 4 March 2020; Acting: 18 September 2019 – 4 March 2020
- President: Muhammadu Buhari; Bola Tinubu
- Preceded by: Winifred Oyo-Ita

Personal details
- Born: Folashade Mejabi; 13 August 1964 (age 62) Kaduna State, Nigeria
- Education: University of Ibadan

Folashade Mejabi Yemi-Esan CFR (née Mejabi; born 13 August 1964), is a Nigerian civil servant and the current head of the civil service of the federation, since 4 March 2020. She acted as head of the civil service from 18 September 2019 till her swearing in on 4 March 2020 following the suspension of Winifred Ekanem Oyo-Ita.

== Early life and education ==
Yemi-Esan was born in Kaduna State, Nigeria. She is from Ikoyi, Ijumu, Kogi State. She had her primary school education at Bishop Smith School, Ilorin and then went to Federal Government College, Ilorin for her secondary school education. She continued to University of Ibadan, where she graduated in 1987 as the best dental surgery student. She later got a certificate in health planning and management, before obtaining a master's degree in public and international administration.

== Career ==
Yemi-Esan started her career at the Federal Ministry of Health in Nigeria, before she was promoted to the position of Director. During her time in the health ministry, she served as liaison officer West Africa Health Organisation (WAHO), coordinator of oral health in schools programme and director of health planning research and statistics.

In 2012, she was promoted to the position of Federal Permanent Secretary, serving as the Permanent Secretary of Service Policy and Strategy Office of the Head of civil service of the federation, Federal Ministry of Information and Culture, Federal Ministry of Education and Federal Ministry of Petroleum Resources.

== Head of the civil service ==
On 18 September 2019, she was appointed as the acting head of civil service of the federation by the president of Nigeria, Muhammadu Buhari, replacing the suspended Winifred Ekanem Oyo-Ita.

On 28 February 2020, she was made the permanent head of civil service of the federation and was sworn into office on 4 March 2020.https://www.vanguardngr.com/2015/10/buhari-appoints-oyo-ita-as-new-head-of-service/

== Awards ==
In October 2022, a Nigerian national honour of Commander of the Order of the Federal Republic (CFR) was conferred on her by President Muhammadu Buhari.
