= Razaq Olatunde Rom Kalilu =

Nigerian professor of art

Professor Razaq Olatunde Rom Kalilu.

Acting Vice-Chancellor
- Incumbent
- Assumed office 2023
- Preceded by: Mojeed Olaide Liasu

Personal details
- Citizenship: Nigeria
- Education: University of Ife, University of Ibadan
- Alma mater: University of Ibadan
- Occupation: Academic
- Profession: Artist, Art Historian

Razaq Olatunde Rom Kalilu is a professor of art and history in the faculty of environmental sciences, Ladoke Akintola University of Technology, Ogbomoso. He is an acting vice chancellor of Ladoke Akintola University of Technology known as (LAUTECH), which is located in Ogbomoso, Oyo State.

== Early life and education ==
He is an alumnus of the University of Ife (which is now known as Obafemi Awolowo University) and the University of Ibadan He holds a PhD from the University of Ibadan (1992)

== Career ==
He began working at Ladoke Akintola University of Technology on September 1, 1992. His appointment as a professor of Arts and Arts History was on October 1, 1999. He was appointed acting vice-chancellor on June 12, 2023. Before joining the university, Advertising, elementary, secondary, college of education, and polytechnic education systems were all areas of expertise for Kalilu.

== Administrative Experience ==
Kalilu is not just an academic; he is also an administrator. He has held positions which include:

- Chairperson for SSATHURAI at both the branch and zonal levels.
- Department Head
- Vice President of the Fine Arts Students Association
- Faculty Dean
- Chair of the Committee of Deans and Provosts
- Chair of the Committee of Deans
- Deputy vice-chancellor at LAUTECH.

== Membership and fellowship ==
- Fellow of the Society of Nigerian Artists.
- Member of the International Association of Astronomical Artists.

== Achievements ==
- He pioneered the development of the inaugural Bachelor of Technology (B.Tech.) degree program in Fine and Applied Arts which was established in Nigeria in 1992.
- The initial curricula in Nigeria for postgraduate diploma, master's, and Doctor of Philosophy degrees in studio arts.

== Awards ==
- In 1979, he won the Gold Medal award for All-Africa Painting Contest.
- In 1997 he was given The National Arts Wizardry award
- He was awarded the Medal for Outstanding Achievement in the 20th Century People category in the year 2000.

== Publications ==
His publications include the following:

- Bearded figure with leather sandals: Islam, historical cognition, and the visual arts of the Yoruba.
- Water Absorption Capacity and Visual Qualities of Pulverised Glass as a Component for Glass Ceramic Glazes
- Derivation of the ash glazes from cattle bone
- Elemental Comparison of Bones of Red Sokoto (Capra Hiracus) and West African Dwarf (Capra Aeagurus) Goats for Production of Glazes
- Typology and Fashion Usage Trends of Ankara in the Twenty-First Century South-Western Nigeria
- The Cultural Attitudes in advertising designs in Nigeria
- The Factor of House Forms in Indoor Environmental Quality of Houses in Selected Cities in Oyo State, Nigeria.
