= Adesegun Olusola Ogunlewe =

Nigerian politician (born 1953)

Lagos State Head of Service
- In office May 2010 – October 2013
- Preceded by: Yakub Abiodun Balogun
- Succeeded by: Josephine Oluseyi Williams

Personal details
- Born: 16 October 1953 (age 73) Igbogbo, Lagos State, Nigeria
- Party: Non-partisian

Adesegun Olusola Ogunlewe (born 16 October 1953) is a Nigerian Public administrator, technocrat and former Lagos State Head of Service.

== Early life ==
Ogunlewe was born on October 16, 1953, at Igbogbo, a city in Ikorodu Local Government Area of Lagos State, Nigeria. He had his elementary education at United African Methodist Church Primary School, Igbogbo before he proceeded to Oriwu College, Ikorodu, Lagos State where he obtained the West Africa School Certificate in 1969. He received a bachelor's degree in Sociology from Obafemi Awolowo University in 1978 and a Post Graduate Diploma in Public administration.

== Civil service ==
He joined the Lagos State Civil Service in 1979 as administrative officer after he completed his university education. In May 2010, he was appointed as Head of Service to succeed Balogun Yakub Abiodun. He retired from the civil service in October 2013 and was succeeded by Josephine Oluseyi Williams, whose appointment was confirmed in the same month by Babatunde Fashola, the Executive Governor of Lagos State.
