= Shehu Ahmadu Musa =

Makama Nupe Shehu Ahmadu Musa GCON, CFR
- Born: 16 January 1935; Bida, Nigeria
- Died: 19 November 2008 (aged 73); London
- Education: University of London (General Certificate of Education); University of Ibadan (Bachelor's degree); University of Calabar (PhD); University of Jos (PhD)
- Alma mater: Barewa College; University of London; University of Ibadan
- Occupations: Public Administrator, Civil Servant, Customs Officer
- Notable work: 1992 population census headcount in Nigeria; 2003 code of conduct in political parties of Nigeria
- Spouse: Hadiza K. Yahaya (m. 1969) Fatima Nnadoko (m. 1970) Aisha Nnakada (m. 1978)
- Children: 10
- Awards: International Mercury Award; Marquis Who's Who
- Honours: Merit of the federal republic of Germany

Shehu Ahmadu Musa, GCON, CFR (16 January 1935 – 19 November 2008) was a public administrator and chieftains holder of Makaman Nupe. He was the Secretary to the Government of the Federation of Nigeria during the Nigerian Second Republic between 1979 and 1983.

== Early life and education ==
Shehu Musa was born in Bida, Middle Belt of Nigeria, Niger State. His father Musa ManDoko was a chieftains title holder in Nupe Kingdom.

He started his education from the Bida South Elementary school in 1943 and finished in 1947 he then moved to Bida Middle School in 1948 to 1949 when he was transferred to Government College Zaria due to his exploit and exceptional performance, there he meet many intelligence and competent colleagues and graduated in 1954. He later in 1955 attended the Nigeria College of Science and Technology, Zaria to 1957 and that same of finishing in Zaria he was admitted to University of Ibadan graduated in 1960, he also attend the University of Minnesota in 1962 to 1963 and University of London in 1963 to 1964 for (GCE). He also holds a PhD of Laws from the University of Jos in 1991 and PhD of letters from the University of Calabar in 1992.

== Career ==
After graduating from the university in 1960 he joined the Northern Regional Civil Service as government auditor of Northern regional bureaucracy and had been attending institutions outside the country to 1965 where he was transferred to federal ministry of finance in Lagos serving as senior assistant secretary. He became the administrative secretary of the Customs and Excise in 1967 and was promoted to deputy permanent secretary in the Ministry of Defence of Nigeria in 1971, he later was appointed as permanent secretary of Ministry of Health in 1974 to 1978 and in 1978 he was the director of Customs for one year and was the last appointment held prior to be becoming SGF in 1979.

== As customs director ==
He was in ministry of health when General Murtala Muhammed made him the director of Nigeria Customs Service in 1978 and he re-organized it. He made the organization carried out the reformation into a better foundation till now it still exist the protocols.

Other office held

Musa has held many position before and even serving as a Secretary to the Federation, such positions includes;

- Governor of the Opaque Special Fund (1972- 1973)
- Chairman Lagos University Teaching Hospital and University of Ibadan Teaching Hospital (1974- 1978)
- Member National Universities Commission Lagos (1974- 1979)
- Chairman Nigeria Red Cross Society Lagos (1982)
- Governor of the World Bank in Nigeria (1983- 1984)
- Board member of the NNPC (1985)
- Member Pan African Relief Organisation (1986)
- Senior member of Independent National Electoral Commission (1987)

Honors

Musa has received various honors when he was still the SGF, such includes;

- Chieftains title of Makaman Nupe in the Nupe Kingdom
- International Mercury Award 1982
- Commander of the federal republic CFR 1982
- Merit of the Federal Republic of Germany 1983.

== 1991 census conduct after retirement ==
As a retired civil servant in Federal level he chaired the Economic and Social Advisory Council from 1989 to 1991 established in Niger State before in 1992 was the chairman of National Population Commission for four year in 1988 and later chaired the Constitutional Conference Commission in 1994 before becoming a commissioner of Indiana Independent Independent National Electoral Commission, Abuja in 1998 to 2003. It was in 1992 when he was the population census head that he conducted the most successful headcount in the country after the first census done in 1951 organized by the colonial masters and had held many non-public position till his death in 2008.

== Code of conduct by Musa ==
His whole life spanned entirely in the public service, the last appointment he held was commissioner of Independent National Electoral Commission in 2003. Musa opined in 2003 that our democracy was in danger if disciplines do not applies in many political parties and suggested for a code of conduct to be adopted by all political parties in the country in which they could be disciplines. He drafted the code of conduct which were used in political parties for peace, public, freedom of political campaigns, compliance with electoral laws, order and regulations of the code for free, fair and credible elections.

He died of Kidney ailments in London hospital, before his demise he was a senior councillor in the Etsu Nupe council.

== Books ==
- Unity in Nigeria for prosperity : ideas of Alhaji Shehu Musa as contained in his speeches and interviews. Shehu A Musa, Aliyu Modibbo. Ed, Aliyu Modibbo, Los Angeles, Anndal Publishers. 1992, OCLC 51515979
- The nation and the chance of becoming seriously and authentically democratic. Shehu A Musa, O B C Nwolise, University of Ibadan, System Purifiers. 1984, Alofe Modern Printers, ISBN 9783067311, 9789783067318, OCLC 39475532, 1994. Subject; Nigeria- Politics and government, Democracy Nigeria. 'Notes'; 'A public lecture organised by the System Purifiers, University of Ibadan, 1994'. Resp; Shehu A. Musa, prologue; Osisioma B.C. Nwolise
- The Nigerian elastic transition to democratic rule : have we finally made it?. University of Ibadan. Alumni Association, Shehu A. Musa. Notes: 'University of Ibadan Millennium Lecture, delivered on Friday, August 25, 2000, at the Trenchard Hall, University of Ibadan'. Ibadan, Nigeria. 2000, Dotson Creative Publishers ISBN 9782029130, 9789782029133, OCLC 51463448
- Address delivered on behalf of his excellency, Alhaji Shehu Shagari: President of the Federal Republic of Nigeria, Commander-in-Chief of the Armed Forces. National Assembly Press, 1982, Lagos, Shehu A. Musa, Subjects; Shagari, Shehu Usman Aliyu, -- 1925–2018, President of Nigeria, Nigeria election, Democracy Nigeria, Nigeria Politics and government, 1960, Conference publication. Notes; 'Address delivered at the Conference on Free Elections holding in Washington D.C., USA, from 4 to 6 November'. 1982 Resp; Shehu A. Musa, Secretary to the Government of the Federation, OCLC 953874418.
