= Stephen Osagiede Oronsaye =

Nigerian accountant and civil servant (born 1950)

- Born: 16 November 1950 (age 75); Lagos
- Occupation: Accountant
- Known for: Former Head of the Nigerian Civil Service

Stephen Osagiede Oronsaye is a Nigerian accountant and civil servant who was appointed Head of the Civil Service of the Federation in June 2009. He began an energetic program of reform immediately after his appointment. He retired on 16 November 2010 after reaching the statutory retirement age of 60, and was succeeded by Oladapo Afolabi.

== Background ==
Stephen Osagiede Oronsaye was born in Lagos on 16 November 1950. His parents were from Uhunmwonde and Oredo Local Council Areas in Edo State. Oronsaye trained with the firm of Peat Marwick Cassleton Elliot (1973–1978), and qualified as a Chartered Accountant in 1978. He became a Partner of the firm in 1989. He joined the Federal Ministry of Finance in December 1995, as Director, Special Duties. Oronsaye was responsible for the merger of the Administrative and Accounting functions of the offices of the State House, computerisation of processes and procedures of the State House, Personnel records, Accounts and Access controls for the offices.

In 1999 he was appointed Principal Secretary to President Olusegun Obasanjo, a position equivalent to Federal Permanent Secretary. He was confirmed as Permanent Secretary, State House, an unusual appointment since he was not a civil servant. In 2006, Oronsaye headed the committee on the review of the Civil Service Rules and Financial Regulations. He was appointed Permanent Secretary of the Federal Ministry of Finance on 20 August 2008.

== Head of the civil service ==
Stephen Oronsaye was appointed Head of the Nigerian Civil Service in June 2009. Soon after his appointment, Stephen Oronsaye and Ahmed Al-Gazali, chairman of the Federal Civil Service Commission, established a new tenure policy limiting the terms of permanent secretaries and directors to eight years. As a result, nine permanent secretaries were forced to retire in October 2009, and many directors were expected to retire by January 2010. In November 2009, Stephen Oronsaye told the newly appointed permanent secretaries that they would be subject to continuous assessment, and their tenure could be terminated at any time for poor performance. However, he reasserted that the compulsory retirement age for civil servants would remain the earlier of 60 years of age or 35 years of pensionable service.

Following a move by the Central Bank of Nigeria to sack the boards of five banks and publish a list of debtors of those banks, in August 2009 Stephen Oronsaye directed Permanent Secretaries to prevent ministries, departments and agencies from withdrawing funds or closing accounts in these banks. Earlier that month Stephen Oronsaye had announced a major reshuffle where almost half of the Permanent Secretaries were assigned to new departments.

In November 2009, he directed that TV sets be removed from all Civil Service offices, on the basis that viewing television during office hours lowers productivity. Also in November 2009, he stated that he had been discussing wage increases for federal civil servants with President Umaru Yar'Adua. In December 2009 he announced plans to train 4,600 civil servants by March 2010 to prepare them for the higher challenges that came with the new tenure policy, and to remove stagnation from the civil service.
