= Administrative Staff College of Nigeria =

Degree awarding institution in Lagos State, Nigeria

Coordinates: 6.4112°N 2.9390°E

- Formation: 1973
- Headquarters: Badagry, Lagos State
- Website: https://ascon.gov.ng/

The Administrative Staff College of Nigeria is a degree awarding institution located at Topo, a town in Badagry, Lagos State, southwestern Nigeria. The college was founded in 1973 by the Federal Government of Nigeria in the Military era as a management development institution for training staff of the civil service.

== Notable alumni ==
- Martin Luther Agwai
- Folashade Sherifat Jaji
- Oladapo Afolabi
