= Oladapo Afolabi =

Nigerian academic

Professor Oladapo Afolabi CFR

Head of Service of the Federation of Nigeria
- In office 18 November 2010 – 29 September 2011
- Preceded by: Steve Oronsaye
- Succeeded by: Sali Isa Bello, cfr

Personal details
- Born: 3 October 1953 (age 73) Ibadan, Oyo State, Nigeria

Professor Oladapo Afolabi CFR, (born 3 October 1953) is a former academic who was sworn in as Head of Service of the Federation of Nigeria by President Goodluck Jonathan on 18 November 2010. In this position, he is responsible for the Nigerian Civil Service.

He is the erstwhile Pro-chancellor of Edwin Clark University, Delta state and has been appointed by the Bola Ahmed Tinubu's administration as the Pro-chancellor of Obafemi Awolowo University

== Birth and academic career ==
Afolabi was born on 3 October 1953 in Ibadan, Oyo State. He is the son of Princess Asimawu Gbemisola Aweni Adeyemi and grandson of the Akinrun of Ikirun, Oba Lawani Adeyemi, Oyeloja II. He attended Igbo-Elerin Grammar School, Ibadan, Mayflower School, Ikenne, Ibadan Grammar School, Ibadan for his secondary education. He attended the University of Ife, now Obafemi Awolowo University, Ile-Ife (1972–1975), earning a BSc in biochemistry. After receiving his degree, he worked as a graduate assistant while studying for his MSc in biochemistry, which he gained in 1978, followed by a PhD in applied chemistry in 1981.

Afolabi won a fellowship at Howard University as an International Atomic Energy Agency Fellow in 1983. He taught at Obafemi Awolowo University, the University of Zimbabwe and Ladoke Akintola University of Technology, Ogbomosho. Afolabi specialised in environmental and food nutritional chemistry, and contributed many papers on related subjects. He played an important role in organising the first Ecological Summit in 1988, which led to creation of the Federal Ministry of Environment.

== Public servant ==
Afolabi joined the Federal Environmental Protection Agency in June 1991. He started at the agency as a manager, rising to become the acting director. He joined the Federal Ministry of Environment when it was formed in 1995. Afolabi chaired the committee that defined the initial structure of the ministry, and then was appointed coordinator and then director of the Department of Pollution Control and Environmental Health. At the Environment Ministry he supervised the Integrated Solid Waste Management Facility for 15 cities, and was responsible for a number of studies on waste management and pollution reduction.

In October 2006, Afolabi was appointed a permanent secretary of the Federal Civil Service by President Olusegun Obasanjo. In June 2007, he became permanent secretary of the Ministry of Labour. In November 2007, he moved to the newly created Federal Ministry of Agriculture and Water Resources, formerly two separate ministries. In February 2009, Afolabi was assigned to the Cabinet Secretariat, in which role he introduced storage of documents in electronic form. In August 2009, he was again posted as a permanent secretary at the Ministry of Education, where he helped end a three-month strike.

== Head of Service ==
Afolabi was sworn in as Head of Service on 18 November 2010. He succeeded Steve Oronsaye, who retired on 16 November 2010 after reaching the statutory retirement age of 60.

== Partial bibliography ==
- BCO Okoye; OA Afolabi (1991). "Heavy metals in the Lagos lagoon sediments". International Journal of Environmental Studies. 1 (37): 35–41. Bibcode:1991IJEnS..37...35O. doi:10.1080/00207239108710615.
- OA Afolabi; BA Oshuntogun (1985). "Preliminary nutritional and chemical evaluation of raw seeds from Mucuna solanei: an underutilized food source". Journal of Agricultural and Food Chemistry. 33 (1): 122–124. Bibcode:1985JAFC...33..122A. doi:10.1021/jf00061a035.
- Folahan O. Ayorinde; James Clifton Jr.; Oladapo A. Afolabi; Robert L. Shepard. (1988). "Rapid transesterification and mass spectrometric approach to seed oil analysis". Journal of the American.
- OA Afolabi; EA Adesulu (1983). "Polynuclear aromatic hydrocarbons in some Nigerian preserved freshwater fish species". Journal of Agricultural and Food Chemistry. 37 (5): 1083–1090. Bibcode:1983JAFC...31.1083A. doi:10.1021/jf00119a040. PMID 6685147.
- OMOSOLA A.; ARAWOMO; OLUSEGUN L. OKE (1984). "Quality changes of Nigerian traditionally processed freshwater fish species". International Journal of Food Science & Technology.
- O. Ayorindea; Michael O. Ologundeb; Erick Y. Nanaa; Brian N. Bernarda; Oladapo A. Afolabib; Olusegun L. Okeb; Robert L. Sheparda (1989). "Determination of fatty acid composition of Amaranthus species". Journal of the American.
- Oladapo A. Afolabi; M. 0. Ologunde; Winston A. Anderson; et al. (1991). "The use of lipase (acetone powder) from Vernonia galamensis in the fatty acid analysis of seed oils". Journal of Chemical Technology Biotechnology. 51 (1): 4146. Bibcode:1991JCTB...51...41A. doi:10.1002/jctb.280510104.
- Oladapo A. Afolabi; Mobolaji E. Alukob; Gino C. Wangc; Winston A. Andersonc; Folahan O. Ayorinded (1989). "Synthesis of toughened elastomer from vernonia galamensis seed oil". Journal of the American.
- OA Afolabi; OL Oke (1984). "Quality assessment of laminated fillet blocks from blue whiting (Micromesistius poutassou)". Food Chemistry. 13 (4): 277–284. doi:10.1016/0308-8146(84)90091-8.
- Omololu 0. Fapojuwo; Oladapo A. Afolabi; Kelechi E. Iheanacho & Joseph A. Maga (1986). "Nature of lipids in African locust beans (Parkia filicoidea Welw.) and changes occurring during processing and storage". Journal of Agricultural and Food Chemistry. 34 (2): 246–248. Bibcode:1986JAFC...34..246F. doi:10.1021/jf00068a022.
