= Folashade Sherifat Jaji =

Nigerian chemist

Lagos State Secretary to State Government
- Incumbent
- Assumed office 30 May 2019

Lagos State Head of Service
- In office 17 February 2015 – 26 October 2015
- Preceded by: Josephine Oluseyi Williams
- Succeeded by: Olabowale Ademola

Permanent Secretary, Lagos State Ministry of Establishments, Training and Pensions
- Preceded by: Tunji Bello

Personal details
- Born: 10 March 1957 (age 69) Surulere, Lagos State, Nigeria
- Party: Non-partisian

Folashade Sherifat Jaji (born 10 March 1957) is a Nigerian chemist, civil servant and the Secretary to Lagos State Government. She was formerly the Head of Service in Lagos State, a post she held after service as the Permanent Secretary, Lagos State Ministry of Establishments, Training and Pensions. She also helped the federal government to improve the civil service fund reserve.

== Early life ==
Sherifat was born on March 3, 1957, in Surulere, a metropolitan city of Lagos State, southwestern Nigeria. She attended Anglican Girls Primary School in Surulere, lagos before she proceeded to Queen's College in Yaba, where she obtained the West Africa School Certificate in 1974. She received a Bachelor of Science degree from the University of Ibadan, where she was trained as a chemist before she enrolled for a Post Graduate Diploma in Public Administration at Administrative Staff College of Nigeria after she completed the compulsory one year Youth Service at the Nigerian Breweries. Having completed the diploma program in 1985, she proceeded to the University of Lagos where she received a Master of Business Administration's degree in 1989.

== Civil Service ==
She joined the Lagos State Civil Service on 27 October 1980 at the state Judicial Service Commission before she was deployed to the state Governor's Office, Department of Political Affairs where she served for two years, between 1980 and 1982, the same year she got a transfer to the state civil service commission where she spent another two years before she returned to the Military Governor's Office at the Department of Programs and Budget where she spent seven years, between 1985 and 1992.

In November 2008, she was appointed Permanent Secretary, Teachers’ Establishment and Pensions Office, a position she held for four years. On 1 March 2011 she became the Permanent Secretary, Lagos State Ministry of Establishments, Training and Pensions. On 17 February 2015, she was appointed as Lagos State Head of Service to succeed Josephine Oluseyi Williams, who was the 17th Head of Service of the State Public Service

On 30 May 2019, Lagos State Governor Babajide Sanwo-Olu appointed Jaji as Secretary to the State Government (SSG).
