= Hakeem Muri-Okunola =

Nigerian lawyer, public administrator and technocrat

- Appointed by: President Bola Ahmed Tinubu

Principal Secretary to the President
- Incumbent
- Assumed office September 2023
- Preceded by: Sabiu Yusuf

Lagos State Head of Service
- In office December 2018 – September 2023

Personal details
- Born: 7 January 1972 (age 54) Lagos Island, Lagos State, Nigeria

Hakeem Muri-Okunola (born 7 January 1972) is a Nigerian lawyer, public administrator, technocrat and currently the Principal Secretary to President Bola Ahmed Tinubu of Nigeria. He also served as the 22nd Lagos State Head of Service. He is the first son of the late respected Justice Muritala Okunola.

== Background & Education ==
After his primary education in Lagos Island where he grew up, a young Muri-Okunola became a student of the Nigeria Navy Secondary School, Lagos in 1982. By 1989, he had become an undergraduate of the Lagos State University, Ojo, graduating in 1995 with a bachelor's degree in Law, following which he completed the mandatory one year of study at the Nigeria Law School.

Three years on, he gained admission into the prestigious Queen Mary & Westfield College, University of London, obtaining a master's degree in International Business Law in 1999.

== Career ==
=== Law ===
Between 1996-1999, he served as an Associate Solicitor with Adepetun, Caxton-Martins and Agbor, before joining Company Secretary/Legal Adviser at Ibile Holdings Limited, the Investment Company of Lagos State Government, a position he held from 2000 to 2003.

=== Civil Service ===
Muri-Okunola joined the Lagos state civil service in 2001.

Between 2003 2005, he was personal assistant to Bola Tinubu, then governor of Lagos until Tinubu appointed him Executive Secretary to the Governor, Land Use and Allocation Committee. Afterwards, he was promoted to the position of Permanent Secretary in the Lagos State Public Service in 2011. He was deployed to the Lands Bureau in the Governor's Office where he supervised the State's Lands Administration machinery. In this capacity, he played significant roles in improving the state's ranking in the World Bank's Ease of Doing Business Index. These include the Electronic Certificate of Occupancy (E-C of O), the Electronic Data Management System (EDMS) and the 30-day processing of consent applications.

In 2015, he was named Permanent Secretary in the Ministry of Youth and Social Development, working on the amended version of the Child's Rights Law and the Child Protection Policy among other things. During this period, he was also on the board of the Lagos State Office for Disability Affairs (LASODA).

Muri-Okunola was appointed Head of Service on 28 December 2018, being the most senior ranking member of the Body of Permanent Secretaries in Lagos State.

== Personal life ==
He lives in Lagos and is married with children. A member of the Ikoyi Club 1938, Lagos Motor Boat Club, Lagos Polo Club and F's Club, his hobbies include soccer, athletics, polo, boating, squash, basketball and many other water sports.
