= Secretary to the Government of the Federation =

Nigerian government position

Secretary to the Government of the Federation of Nigeria
- Incumbent; George Akume since 29 June 2025
- Office of the Secretary of the Government of the Federation
- Style: Mr. Secretary (informal); The Honorable (formal)
- Abbreviation: SGF
- Member of: Federal Executive Council
- Reports to: President of Nigeria
- Seat: SGF Office, Shehu Shagari Complex, Three Arms Zone, Abuja
- Appointer: The President
- Formation: 1 September 1961 (65 years ago)
- First holder: Dr. S.O Wey
- Website: osgf.gov.ng

The Secretary to the Government of the Federation or SGF is the official title of the political appointee responsible for ensuring the effective coordination and monitoring of the implementation of government policies and programmes in the hierarchy of Nigerian government.

== History ==
Until the abolition of the post of prime minister in 1966, the SGF served as the principal cabinet secretary in the Federal Executive Council. Upon the assumption of President Muhammadu Buhari to office in 2015, many powers were conferred to the SGF to the point that some political analysts said that he wielded more power than the vice president. In a move to strengthen service delivery, President Bola Tinubu has approved the deployment of 12 government institutions to the office of the SGF.

== Office of the Secretary of the Government of the Federation ==
The following are the cabinets for the effective discharge of duties by the secretary:

- Cabinet Affairs Office
  - Economic and Finance Department
  - Governance and Security Department
  - Social Infrastructure Department
- Ecological Project Office
  - Drought Desertification Coastal Zone
  - Pollution Control Department
  - Soil Erosion and Flood Control
  - Special Duties
  - Public Procurement Department
- General Services Office
  - Finance and Accounts Department
  - General Services Department
  - Human Resource Management
  - Information and Communications Technology
  - Internal Audit Department
  - Library Department
  - Planning, Research and Statistics Department
  - Procurement
  - Reform Coordination and Service Improvement
- Political and Economic Affairs Office
  - Economic Monitoring, Multilateral and Research Department
  - International Organisation Department
  - National Authority On Chemical and Biological Weapons Convention
  - Nigerian National Volunteer Service
  - Political Research and Constitutional Matters Department
  - Public Affairs and Bilateral Relations Department
- Special Services Office
  - Administration and Inspectorate Department
  - Secretariat and External Affairs Department

=== Agencies under the OSGF ===
- National Identity Management Commission
- Federal Road Safety Commission
- Nigerian Christian Pilgrim Commission
- Niger Delta Development Commission
- National Hajj Commission of Nigeria
- National Lottery Trust Fund
- Nigeria National Merit Award
- National Lottery Regulatory Commission
- Code of Conduct Bureau
- Nigeria Atomic Energy Commission
- National Agency for the Control of AIDS
- New Partnership for African Development
- National Poverty Eradication Programme
- National Commission for Refugees

== Secretaries ==
Head of Government	Name	Tenure Start	Tenure End
Sir Abubakar Tafawa Balewa	Dr. S. O. Wey	1 September 1961	16 January 1966
Johnson Aguiyi-Ironsi; Yakubu Gowon	Harlen Anireju Ejueyitchie	4 August 1966	20 December 1970
Johnson Aguiyi-Ironsi; Yakubu Gowon	A. A. Atta	21 December 1970	12 June 1972
Johnson Aguiyi-Ironsi; Yakubu Gowon	Charles Olatunde Lawson	16 August 1972	31 March 1975
Yakubu Gowon; Murtala Muhammed; Olusegun Obasanjo	A. A. Ayida	23 April 1975	31 March 1977
Olusegun Obasanjo	Adamu Liman Ciroma	1 April 1977	30 September 1979
Shehu Shagari	Shehu Ahmadu Musa	1 October 1979	31 December 1983
Muhammadu Buhari; Ibrahim Babangida	G. A. Longe	1 January 1984	30 January 1986
Ibrahim Babangida	Olu Falae	31 January 1986	31 December 1989
Ibrahim Babangida	Aliyu Mohammed	1 January 1990	26 August 1993
Ernest Shonekan	Mustafa Umara	27 August 1993	17 November 1993
Sani Abacha; Abdulsalami Abubakar	Aminu Saleh	18 November 1993	17 October 1995
Sani Abacha; Abdulsalami Abubakar	Gidado Idris	17 October 1995	28 May 1999
Olusegun Obasanjo	Ufot Ekaette	29 May 1999	28 May 2007
Umaru Musa Yar'Adua	Baba Gana Kingibe	29 May 2007	8 October 2008
Umaru Musa Yar'Adua	Yayale Ahmed	8 October 2008	29 May 2011
Goodluck Jonathan	Anyim Pius Anyim	1 May 2011	29 May 2015
Muhammadu Buhari	Ogbonnaya Onu	1 June 2015	27 August 2015
Muhammadu Buhari	Babachir David Lawal	27 August 2015	29 October 2017
Muhammadu Buhari	Boss Gida Mustapha	1 November 2017	29 May 2023
Bola Tinubu	George Akume	7 June 2023	Present

== See also ==
- Prime Minister of Nigeria
- Chief Cabinet Secretary
- Clerk of the Privy Council (Canada)
