= Federal Civil Service Commission (Nigeria) =

Executive body in Nigeria

Federal Civil Service Commission of Nigeria (FCSC) is an executive body in Nigeria that has the authority to make appointments and transfers, and to exercise disciplinary control over all Federal Civil Servants. No officer can be appointed into the Civil Service without authorization from the Federal Civil Service Commission if they have been convicted of a crime, or had previously been employed in the Government Service and had been dismissed or asked to resign or retire.

== Duties ==
The Federal Civil Service Commission (FCSC) is responsible for:

- Representation of the Civil Service Commission ers at Senior Staff Committee meetings of Ministries
- Review and approval of recommendations on Disciplinary cases of senior officers
- Recruitment of senior Officers
- Ratification of promotion of offices to senior positions, including conducting promotion interviews and exams
- Hearing appeals on matters of appointment, promotion and disciplines
- Providing guidelines on appointments, promotions and discipline.

In the case of appointments at the Director or Permanent Secretary level, the Chairman of the FCSC may head a panel that interviews candidates who pass the written examination.

== Staff ==
All staff of the Federal Civil Service Commission with the exception of the chairman and commissioners are civil servants directly under the control of the Office of the Head of Civil Service of the Federation. In August 2009, The Chairman of the Federal Civil Service Commission, Ahmed Al-Gazali, and the Head of Civil Service, Stephen Osagiede Oronsaye, initiated a new tenure policy that provides a four-year term renewable once for permanent secretaries and eight-year term for directors. In October 2009, the two men disagreed over whether the Head of Civil Service could require candidates for senior positions to undergo screening before sitting FCSC examinations.

== See also ==
- Nigerian Civil Service
