= Adeniyi Sulaimon Gbadegesin =

Adeniyi Sulaimon Gbadegesin (born 13 February 1958) is an academic and was vice chancellor of the Ladoke Akintola University of Technology, LAUTECH at Ogbomosho between 2011 and 2018

== Education ==
Adeniyi got his bachelor in science in geography (1979) and also did his master's degree in geography (1981), He got his doctorate degree (1984) at University of Ibadan.

== Career ==
Adeniyi started his academic career as an assistant lecturer (1983) and got promoted to the post of lecturer II (1984) before becoming lecturer I (1988) and senior lecturer (1991). He became a reader (1996) and a professor (1999). He did all these in the department of Geography.On the 13th of February 2014.He was announced as the vice chancellor of Ladoke Akintola University Ogbomosho by the pro-Vice chancellor in Oyo state.

== Affiliations ==
He is affiliated to professional bodies which includes; Vice president of Association of Nigeria Geographers; Member of the society for International development, Ibadan; member of Ibadan socio-economic group.

== Awards ==
Adeniyi has gotten awards which include Nigeria's cocoa marketing board scholarship award between 1997 and 1979.
