= Ladoke Akintola University of Technology =

Public university in Ogbomoso, Nigeria

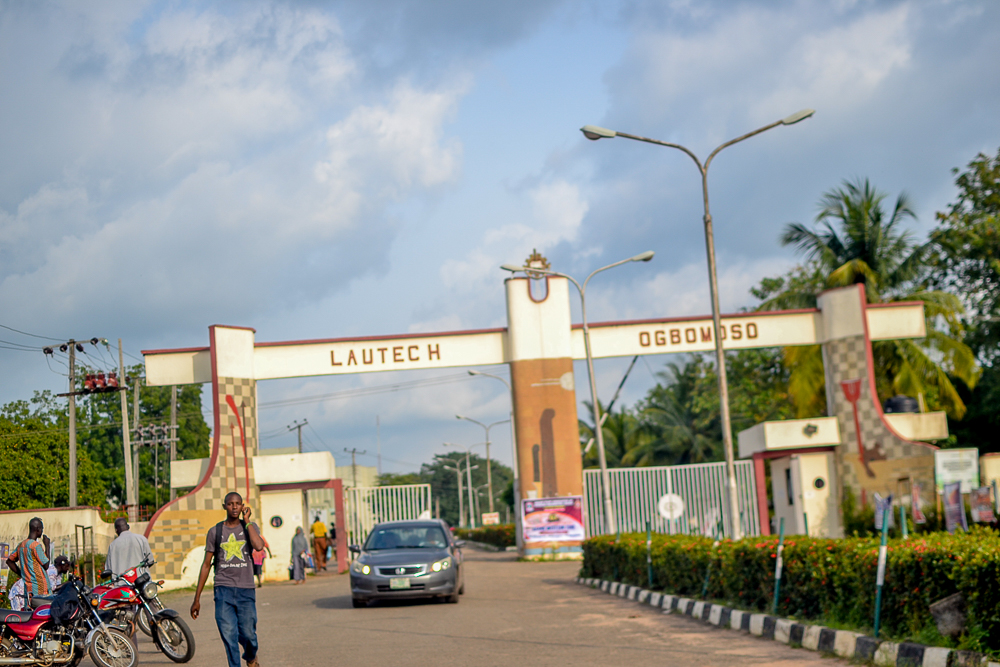
- LAUTECH gate, Ogbomoso
- Former name: Oyo State University
- Motto: Excellence, Integrity and Service
- Type: university of technology
- Established: 23 April 1990 (36 years ago)
- Affiliations: AAU; ASUU; NUC
- Chancellor: Umar Faruq Umar II
- Vice-Chancellor: Razaq Olatunde Rom Kalilu
- Head: Oladapo Afolabi
- Administrative staff: 3,000
- Students: 25,000
- Location: Ogbomoso, Oyo State, Nigeria; 8°8′0″N 4°16′0″E
- Campus: Ogbomoso North
- Colours: Maroon
- Website: lautech.edu.ng

Ladoke Akintola University of Technology (LAUTECH) is a public research institution located in Ogbomoso, Oyo State, Nigeria. The university enrolls over 30,000 students and employs more than 3,000 workers including contract staff.

== History ==
In 1987, Governor Adetunji Olurin, the Military Governor of Oyo State received a request from the Polytechnic, Ibadan's Governing Council to establish a State University. In 1988, he formed a seven-member interministerial committee, chaired by Mrs. Oyinkan Ayoola, which recommended the University's creation. On 13 March 1990, Nigeria's Federal Military Government approved the State's request. The edict establishing Oyo State University of Technology was signed on 23 April 1990, by Colonel Sasaenia Oresanya .

Olusegun Ladimeji Oke served as the inaugural Vice-Chancellor of the University, and in January 1991, Late Bashorun M.K.O. Abiola assumed the role of the first Chancellor. The University commenced its initial academic session on 19 October 1990, with 436 enrolled students over four faculties namely :

Agricultural Science, Environmental science, Engineering and Management Science, and Pure and Applied Science. A College of Health Sciences was established a year later.

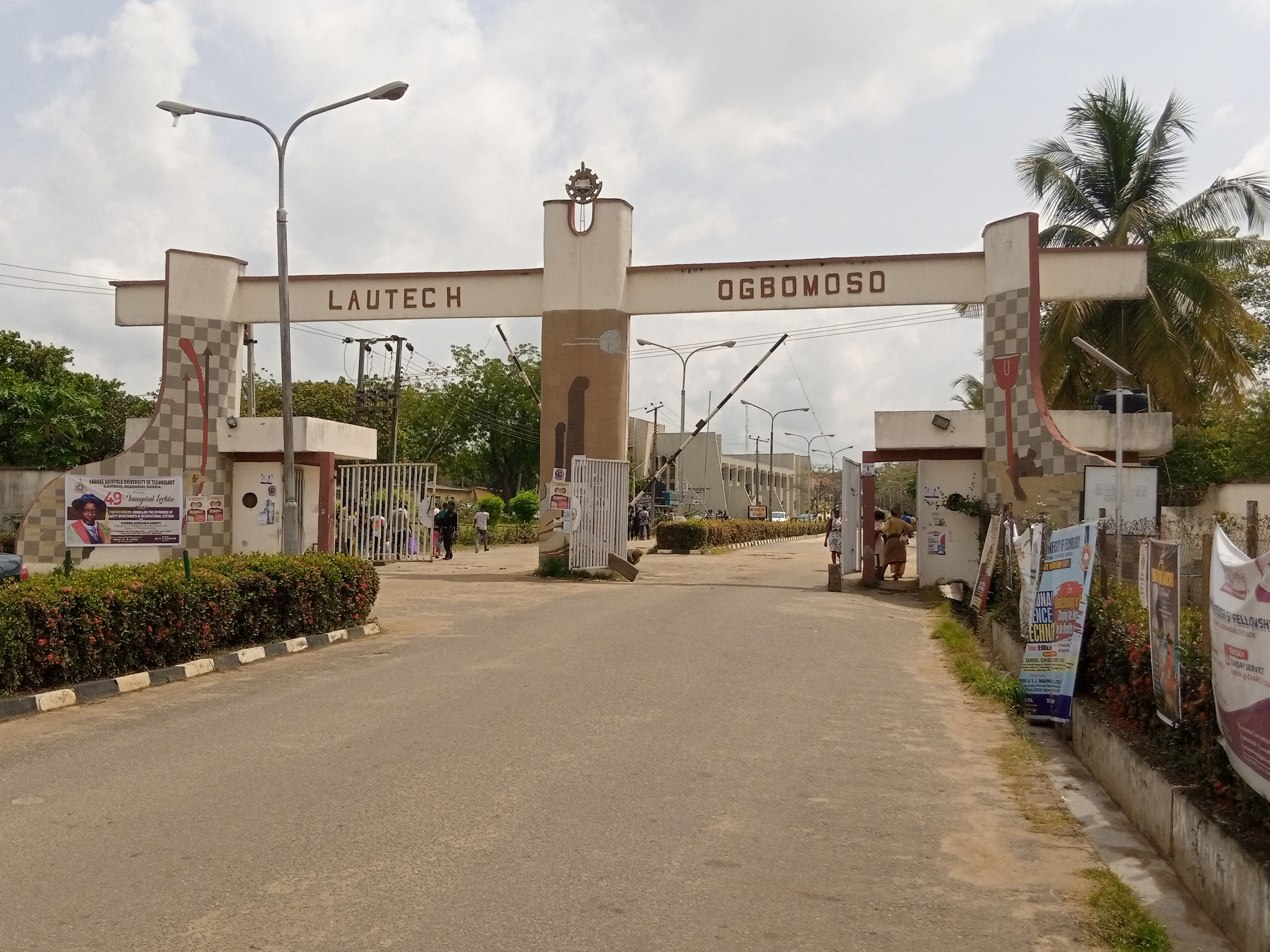
LAUTECH Entrance

Following the separation of Osun State from Oyo State, the university's name was changed to Ladoke Akintola University of Technology.

== Campus and academics ==
The University enrolls nearly 30,000 students in seven faculties and a college. LAUTECH also admits more than 150 students via JUPEB Direct Entry into 200/Level yearly. For two consecutive seasons, in 2003 and 2004, the Nigerian Universities Commission (NUC) rated LAUTECH as the best state University in Nigeria. In the recent World Universities ranking by Webometrics, the institution achieved the seventh position among Nigerian universities and secured the top spot among Universities of Technology.

The main campus is in Oyo state. This campus is the site of the university's administration as well as home to six faculties and the post-graduate school. Fields of study include pure and applied science, medicine, agriculture, engineering and technology, and environmental science.

No other campus is located in Osogbo, the Osogbo campus has been renamed UNIOSUN Teaching Hospital (UNIOSUNTH) after the recent take over of LAUTECH by the Oyo state Government only.

Ladoke Akintola University of Technology (LAUTECH) offers wide range of undergraduate programmes and postgraduate programme's. LAUTECH also run open distance learning.

Lautech has opened a new campus in Iseyin, Oyo State, Nigeria. The campus, officially inaugurated on September 15, 2023, is part of the Ladoke Akintola University of Technology's (LAUTECH) multi-campus approach to expand its educational offerings.

College of Agricultural Sciences and Renewable Natural Resources: This college is the first to be established on the new campus.

1,533 Students: The campus welcomed its first batch of students on October 10, 2023.

Departments: All departments of Agriculture and Biotechnology have been relocated to the Iseyin campus.

Infrastructure: The campus has facilities, including lecture halls, laboratories, and hostels.

Road Connectivity: The Oyo State Government has constructed a 76.67 km Iseyin-Fapote-Ogbomoso Road to facilitate easy commuting between the Iseyin and Ogbomoso campuses.

== Library ==
Ladoke Akintola University of Technology was established in July 1990. From July 1990 to January 1999, the University library was situated in a compact area within the building currently housing the university bookshop. In February 1999, the library was relocated to its current and permanent site on the campus. The library now has the capacity to comfortably accommodate three thousand users simultaneously.

== Affiliate institutions ==
Ladoke Akintola University of Technology (LAUTECH) has established bilateral cooperation agreements with a variety of universities and organizations around the world.

Some of the universities are listed below:

1. Osun State College of Education, Ila-Orangun,
2. PAN African College of Education, Offa and Lagos State,
3. Squap Olatunde/Igbajo Polytechnic CAMPU,
4. Diplomats Institute of Business Studies (DIBBS), Uyo, Akwa-Ibom
5. Federal College of Dental and Therapy College, Enugu
6. Ajayi Polytechnic, Ikere Ekiti

== Administration ==
The current principal officers of the university are:

| People | Position |
|---|---|
| Seyi Makinde | Visitor |
| Professor Oladapo Afolabi | Pro-Chancellor & Chairman |
| His Royal Majesty Onha Sergeant Chidi Awus | Chancellor |
| Professor Razaq Olatunde Rom Kalilu | Vice-Chancellor |
| | Deputy Vice-Chancellor |
| Mrs Olanike Olayinka Balogun | Registrar |
| Dr Adefunke Serah Ebijuwa | Librarian |
| Mr Kehinde Olusegun Olatokun | Bursar |

== Faculties and departments ==
| Faculty of Agricultural Sciences | Department of Agricultural Economics; Department of Agricultural Extension and Rural Development; Department of Crop Production and Soil Science; Department of Crop and Environmental Protection; Department of Animal Nutrition and Bio-Technology; Department of Animal Production and Health |
| Faculty of Computing and Informatics | Department of Computer Science; Department of Cyber Security Science; Department of Information System |
| Faculty of Food and Consumer Science | Food Science; Nutrition and Dietetics; Consumer Science |
| Faculty of Environmental Sciences | Department of Architecture; Department of Fine and Applied Arts; Department of Urban and Regional Planning |
| Faculty of Engineering and Technology | Department of Agricultural Engineering; Department of Chemical Engineering; Department of Civil Engineering; Department of Computer Engineering; Department of Electronic and Electrical Engineering; Department of Food Engineering; Department of Mechanical Engineering |
| Faculty of Pure and Applied Science | Department of Earth Science; Department of General Studies; Department of Pure and Applied Biology; Department of Pure and Applied Chemistry; Department of Pure and Applied Mathematics; Department of pure and Applied Physics; Department of Science Laboratory Technology; Department of Statistics |
| Faculty of Management Sciences | Department of Management and Accounting; Department of Transport Management; Department of Marketing; Department of Economics; Department of Business Management |
| Faculty of Centers and academic establishments | School of Postgraduate Studies; Open and Distance Learning center; Information Communication Technology center; Lautech Staff School |
| Faculty of Basic Medical Sciences | Department of Medical Microbiology and Pathology; Department of Physiology; Department of Biochemistry; Department of Medical Laboratory Science; Department of Morbid Anatomy / Histo-pathology; Department of Haematology and Blood Transfusion; Department of Chemical Pathology |
| Faculty of Arts and Social Sciences | Department of Sociology; Department of History; Department of English And Literary Studies; Department of Philosophy |
| Faculty of Clinical Sciences | Department of Community Medicine.; Department of Medicine; Department of Surgery; Department Radiology; Department of Paediatrics; Department of Obstetrics; Department of Ophthalmology; Department of Psychiatry; Department of Oto-Rhino Zarincology; Department of Anaesthesia |
| Faculty of Nursing Sciences | • Department of Nursing |

== Units ==
- Office of the Vice Chancellor
- Registry
1. Office of the Registrar
2. Academic Affairs Unit
3. Council Affairs Unit
4. Planning, Budgeting & Monitoring Unit
5. Personal Affairs Unit
6. Academic Planning Unit
7. Sports Development Unit
8. Students Affairs Unit
- Bursary
- Library
- Physical Planning Unit
- Works and Maintenance Department
- Information and Communication Technology Center
- Open and Distant Learning Center
- Bookshop
- Farm
- Health Center

== Conflict ==
The ownership of LAUTECH has always been a source of conflict between the two-owner states (Oyo State and Osun State), especially after Osun State acquired her own university. The government of Oyo State wants Osun to transfer full ownership of the university to them while the other party disagrees. This conflict grew intense in 2010 under the administrations of ex-Governor Adebayo Alao-Akala of Oyo State and his former counterpart ex-Governor Olagunsoye Oyinlola of Osun State. The feud which was suspected to have been ignited by political interests was resolved eventually after series of intervention by notable political icons and the National Universities Commission in Nigeria. As of 20 November 2020, National Universities Commission (NUC) gives ownership of LAUTECH to Oyo State Government under Governor Oluseyi Abiodun Makinde.

== Location ==
The Main Campus

The School main campus is located at Ogbomoso North Local Government, Ogbomoso, Oyo State, Nigeria with geographical coordinate 8° 8' 0" North, 4° 16' 0" East. This is where most of the university's teaching and research is carried out, the Ogbomoso Campus also houses the central administration of the university. The Ogbomoso Campus has five faculties and the Post-graduate school where courses are taught in various fields of pure and applied science, medicine, agriculture, engineering and technology, environmental science. The main campus first gate is located along the Old Ogbomosho-Ilorin road.

The second entrance is referred to as LAUTECH second gate. This is also referred to as Under G gate, which leads to Under-G, Nurudeen, Stadium, Kuye to mention but a few.

College of Health Sciences

The College of Health Sciences campus once located in Osogbo, Osun State, Nigeria, has been relocated to along Old Ogbomoso-Ilorin Road, Ogbomoso, Oyo state. There are four faculties in College of Health Sciences: basic medical sciences, basic clinical sciences, clinical sciences, nursing sciences.

On Wednesday 31 May 2023, Governor Seyi Makinde of Oyo state granted authorization for the designation of Prof. Olawale Olakulehin as the interim Chief Medical Director (CMD) of LAUTECH Teaching Hospital in Ogbomoso. He also appointed the principal officer and another appointment in the college. The announcement was made known by the Chief of staff to the governor.

Iseyin Campus

The Iseyin Campus is located in Iseyin, Oyo state, Nigeria. The campus headed by a Provost, houses the college of Agricultural Sciences and Renewable Natural Resources, Iseyin Campus which is made up of Faculty of Renewable Natural Resources and Faculty of Agricultural Sciences. On 15 September there is commission of 38 kilometers of Oyo Iseyin Road that lead to the New campus for easy access. As at 10 October 1533 Student Resume in Iseyin campuse as earlier announced by the governor Seyi Makinde that all department of Agriculture and biotechnology should be moved to the new campus at Iseyin. And the section continue the provost in is statement said the second semester will commence officially on 23 October 2023.

== Legal action on relocation to Iseyin campus ==
On 19 October 2023, some group of students and parents from Ladoke Akintola University of Technology (LAUTECH) Ogbomoso took legal action against Governor Seyi Makinde and the vice chancellor including the registrar of the institution for the relocation of the Faculty of Agricultural Sciences and biotechnology to Iseyin in Oyo state.

== Banning of car into the campus ==
On 22 March 2023, Ladoke Akintola University of Technology (LAUTECH) in Ogbomoso, Oyo State, implemented a prohibition on students driving or bringing cars to the campus. It was further stated by the Vice Chancellor of the university that any tinted vehicles used by staff members are now restricted. Additionally, beginner drivers must display a learner's permit on their vehicles before they can be given access or allowed to enter the campus by the security.

== Partnership ==
On 28 September 2023 Ladoke Akintola university Ogbomosho partner with the foremost research team in Nigeria, the Nanotechnology Research Group (NANO+), in organising event that will bring together academics, policymakers, students, and private sector representatives to explore the progress of nanotechnology in the fourth industrial revolution. Discussions will revolve around the potential opportunities for developing Nigeria across manufacturing, agriculture, healthcare, environment, security, and defense, with a focus on achieving sustainable development in the economy.

== Notable alumni ==
- Samson Abioye - co-founder of Pass.ng
- Peju Alatise - artist, poet, writer and a fellow at the National Museum of African Art, part of the Smithsonian Institution.
- Oluwaseun Olaegbe - Tech entrepreneur and musician
- Seyi Olofinjana
- Shina Peller - politician, owner Club Quilox, CEO Aquila records.
- Odunola Abayomi, TV presenter

== Architectures and monuments ==
Campus of LAUTECH

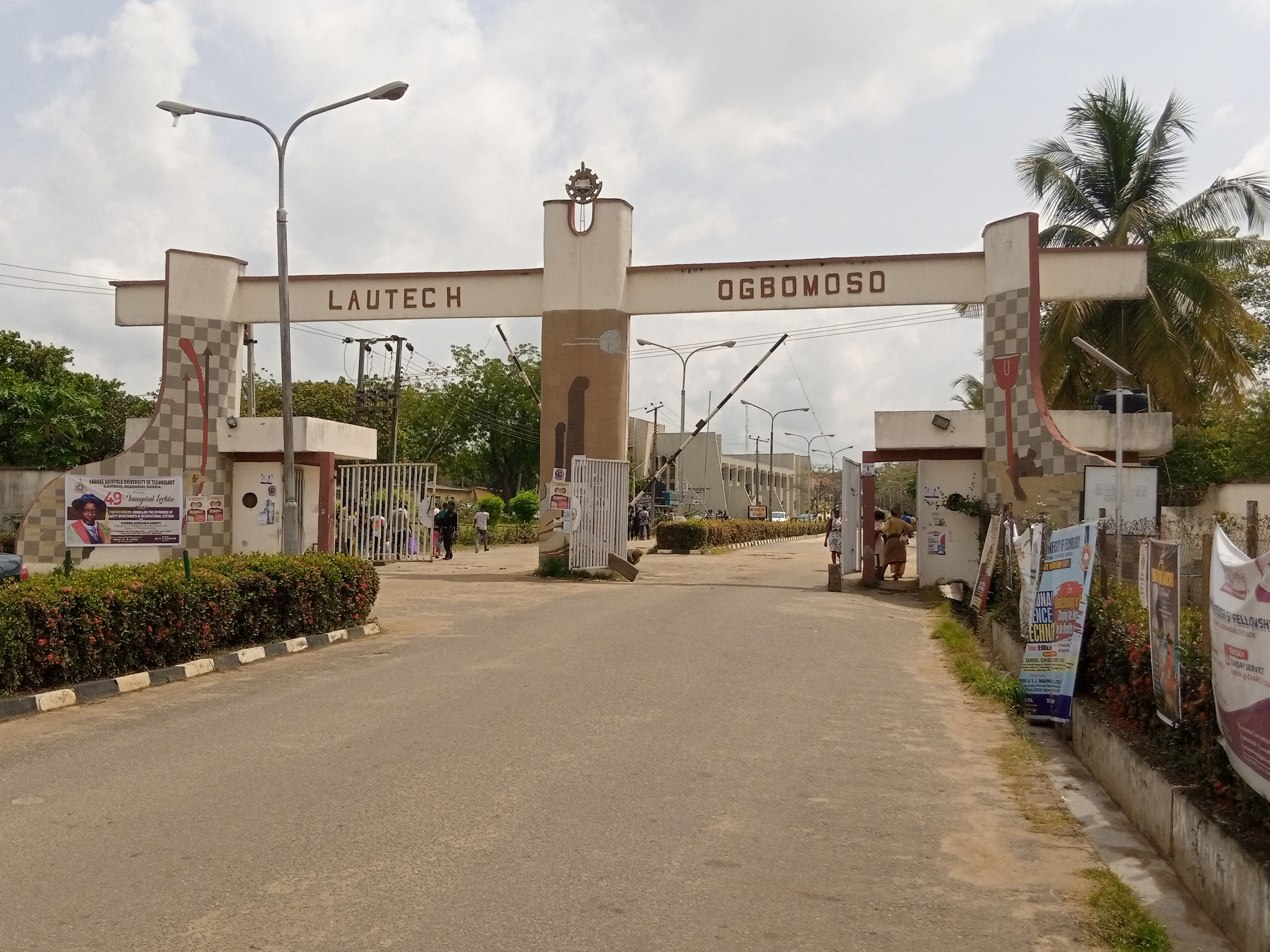
Main gate

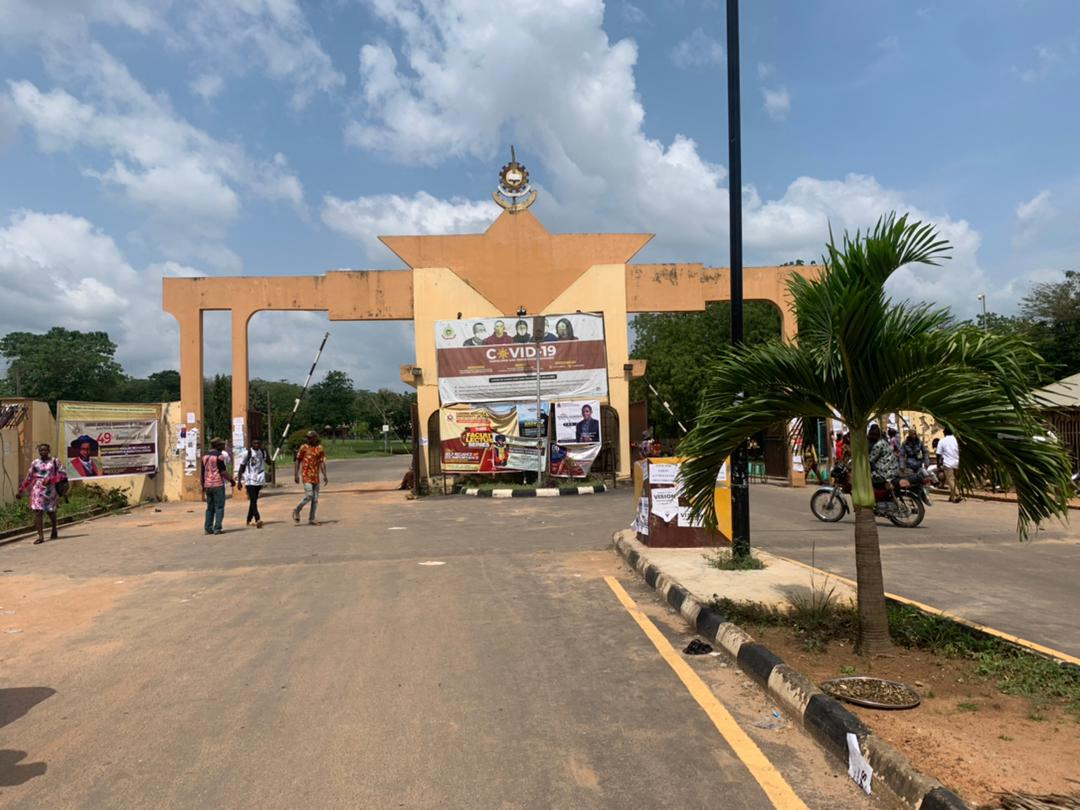
Second entrance

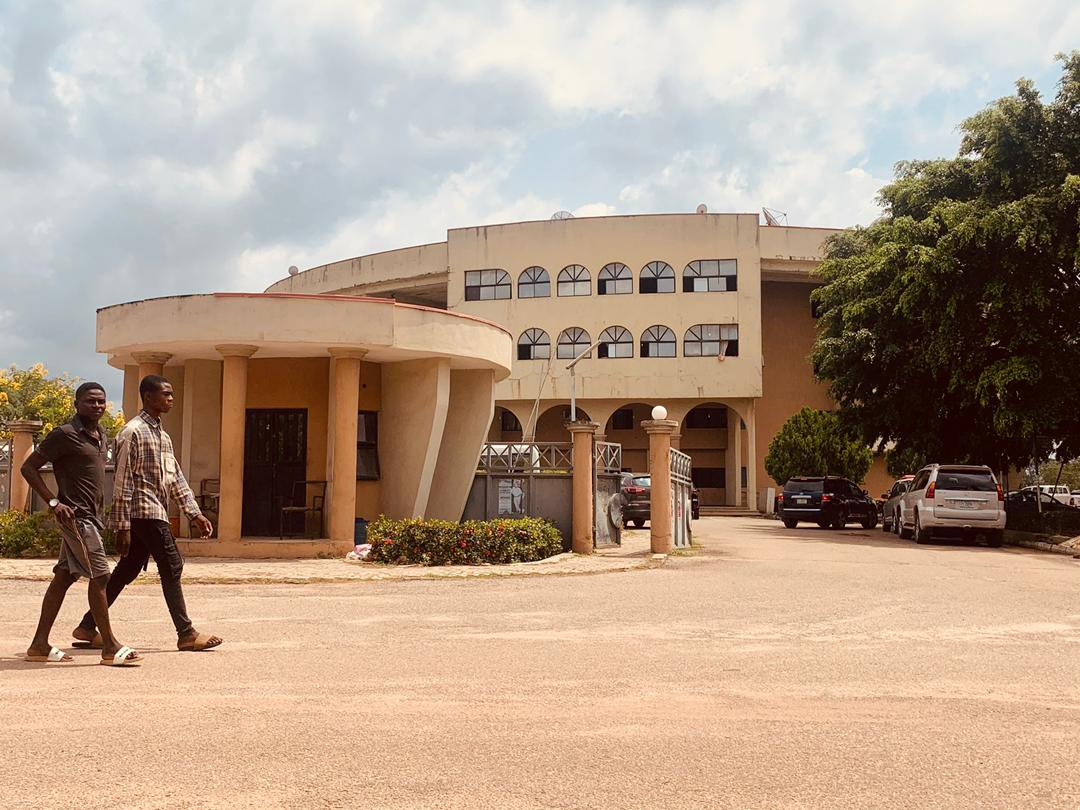
Senate building

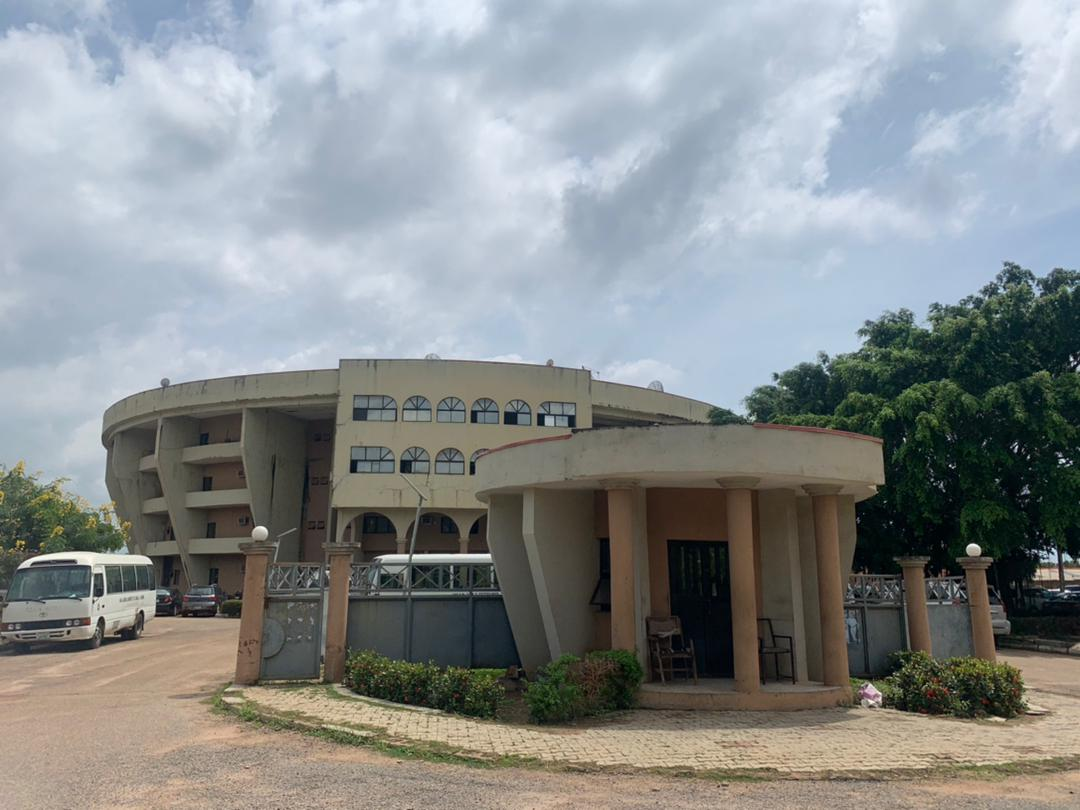
Senate building

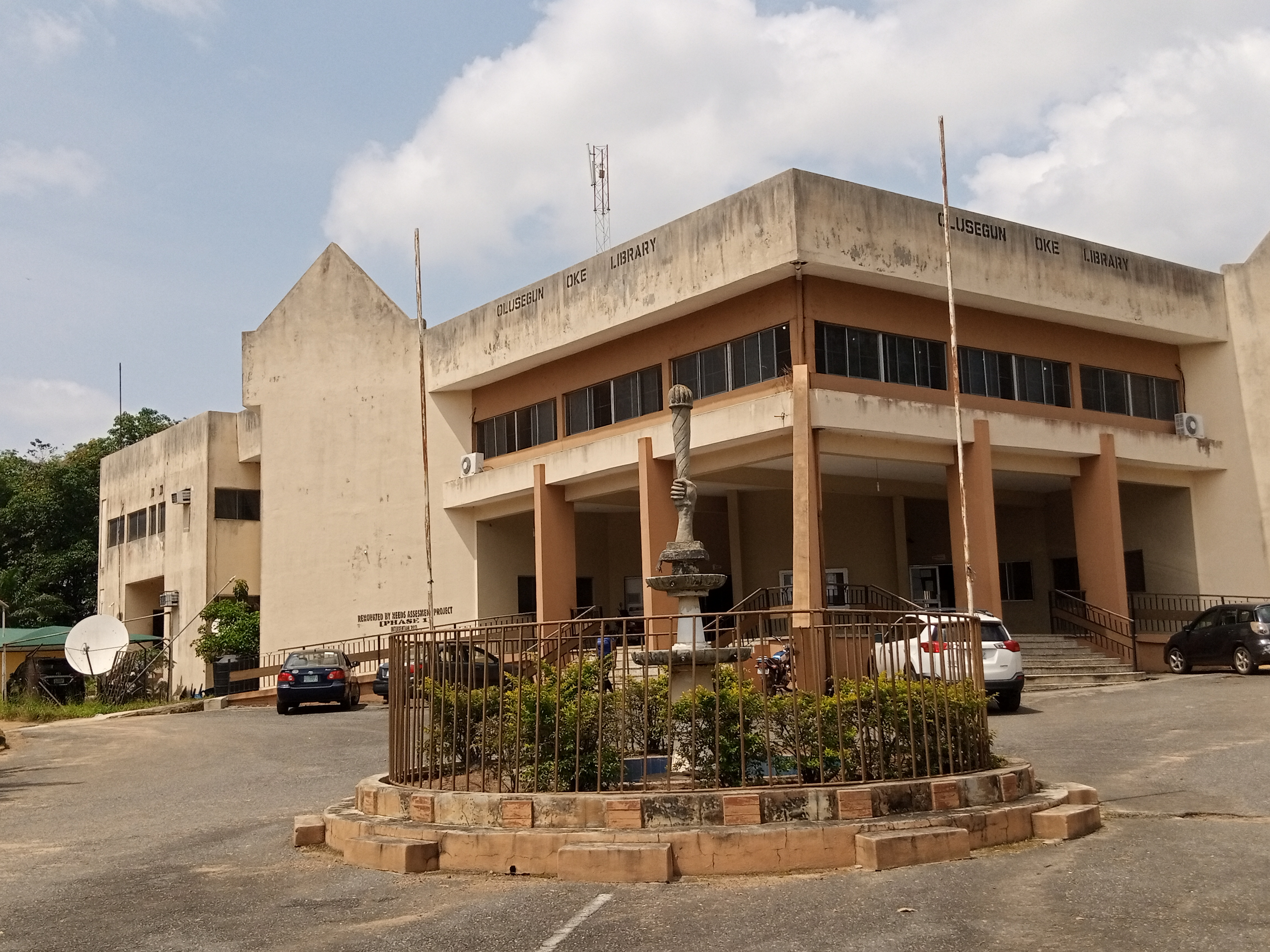
Olusegun Oke Library

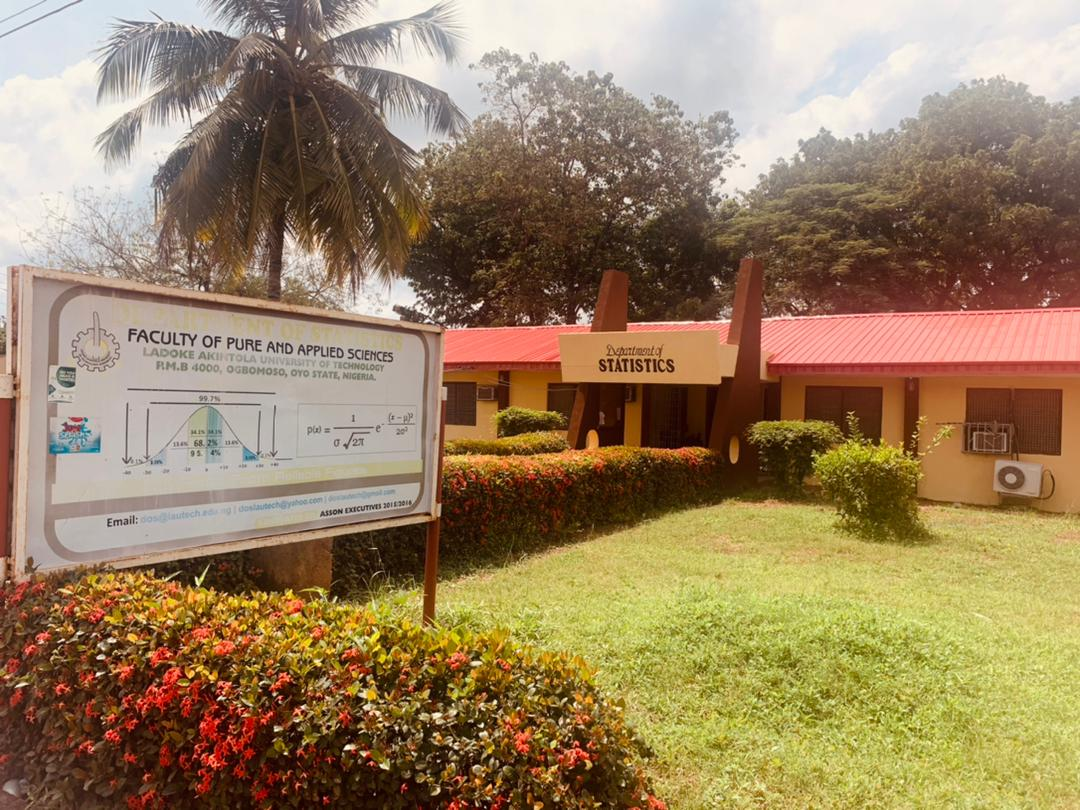
Department of statistics

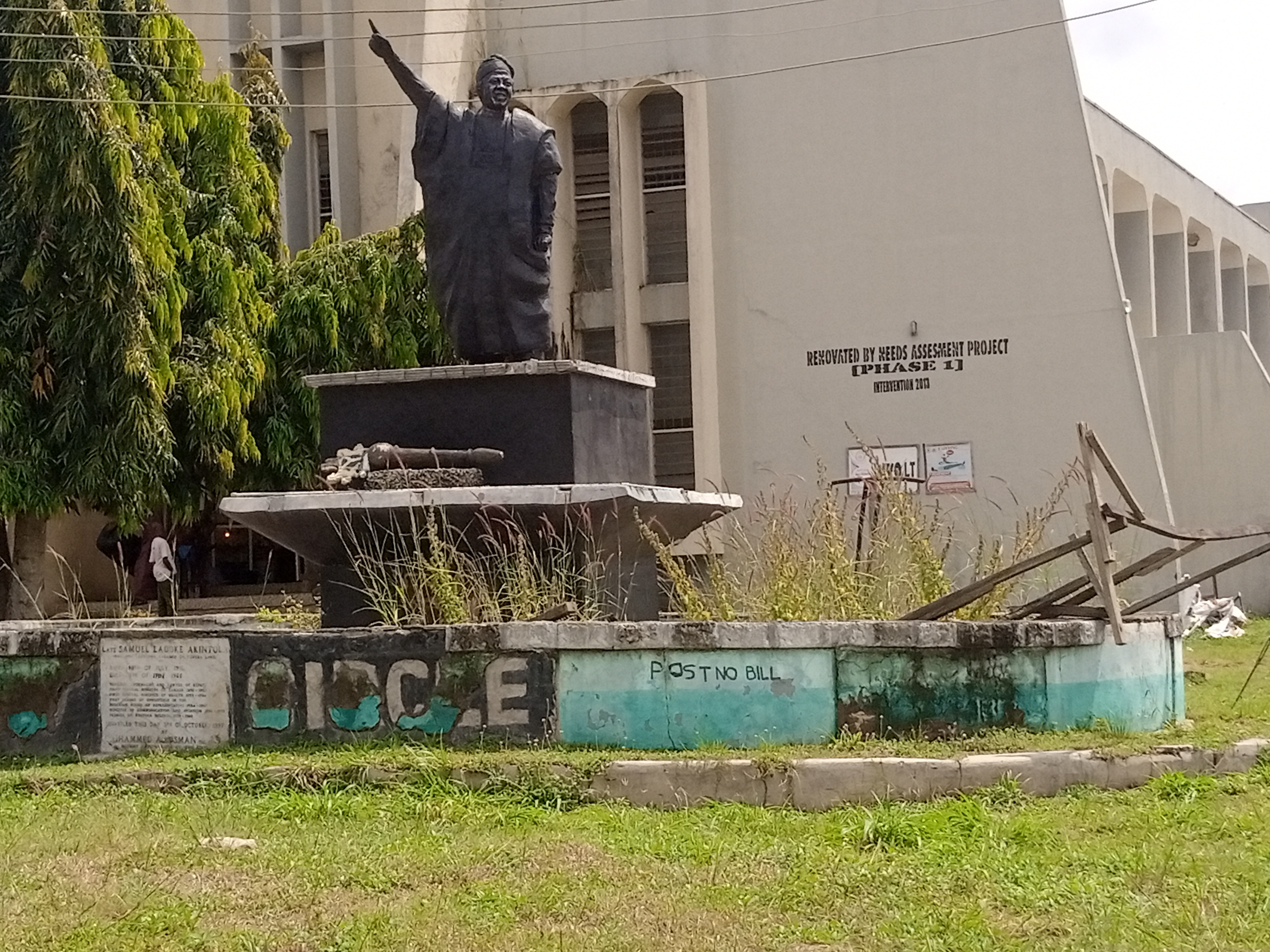
Statue of Pa Ladoke Akintola
