= History of the Aro people =

Aro History starts from Ibibio migration to the present Arochukwu area.

== Ibibio presence ==
Before Igbo arrival in the Aro territory, a group of proto Ibibio migrated to the area and established the Ibom Kingdom during the Bantu expansion. This proto Ibibio group originally came from Usak Edet (Isanguele), a segment of the Ejagham in present-day Southern Cameroon.

== Igbo migration ==
The Igbo migration led by Eze Agwu clan from Abiriba among the Ibibio in the Aro territory started around the 17th century. Tensions escalated between the Eze Agwu group led by Agwu Inobia and Obong Okon Ita kingdom led by Akpan Okon resulting in the Aro-Ibibio Wars. The Efik were originally from the Ibom Kingdom and might have left before or during the Aro-Ibibio Wars. Neither group had a victorious position in the war. Eze Agwu asked Priest Nnachi of the Edda clan near Afikpo for help. The alliance also supported prince Akakpokpo Okon's coup against his brother Akpan Okon. The war escalated and Nnachi called on Eastern Cross River allies for assistance.

== Akpa invasion and the foundation of Arochukwu ==
Osim and Akuma Nnubi were Akpa merchant princes from the Akamkpa area. They led Akpa forces into the Aro territory to assist their Igbo allies. However, this came at the cost of Osim losing his life at the start of the 18th century. The Arochukwu kingdom was founded with Akuma as its first king or EzeAro. After Akuma died, the Igbo took over the throne starting with Nnachi's son Oke Nnachi in 1720. Many changes occurred as Arochukwu expanded into 19 city-states due to the increasing population and Aro colonies were forming throughout the area now known as Southern Nigeria.

== Aro Confederacy ==
By the mid-18th century, there were mass migrations of several Aro business families all over Eastern Nigeria and surrounding areas. This migration, influence of their god Chukwu Abiama through priests, and their military power supported by alliances with several related neighboring Igbo and eastern Cross River militarized states (particularly Ohafia, Abam, Abiriba, Afikpo, Ekoi, etc.) quickly established the Aro Confederacy as a regional economic power.

Aro activities helped coastal Niger Delta city-states become important centers for the export of palm oil and slaves. Such city-states included Opobo, Bonny, Brass, Calabar, as well as other slave trading city-states controlled by the Ijaw, Efik, and Igbo. The Aros formed a strong trading network, colonies, and incorporated hundreds of communities that formed into powerful kingdoms. The Ajalli, Arondizuogu, and Bende Kingdoms were the most powerful Aro states in the Confederacy after Arochukwu. Some were founded and named after Commanders and Chiefs like Izuogu Mgbokpo and Iheme whom led Aro forces to conquer Ikpa Ora and founded Arondizuogu. Later Aro commanders such as Okoro Idozuka also of Arondizuogu expanded the state's borders through warfare in the start of the 19th century. The Aro Confederacy's power, however, was mostly derived from its economic and religious position. With European colonists on their way at the end of the 19th century, things changed.

== British conquest ==
British colonialism in the late 19th century turned Anglo-Aro relations sour. Aro leaders knew that Christianity, colonialism, and end of their monopoly would destroy Aro economic rule. Also the British felt that repeated Aro attacks rendered outright war inescapable. They made plans for war in 1899. The conflict had both religious and economic causes. Aro traders and the Royal Niger Company, had their own issues. An Aro invasion of Obegu in 1901 started the Anglo-Aro War. In 1902, following a direct attack on Arochukwu and months of fighting, the British were victorious. The Aro Confederacy's power was shattered, making it easier for the British to take over the Eastern Nigerian region although resistance in the area was far from over. Although Aro dominance crumbled in March 1902, many Aros took part in later resistances against the British in the region such as Afikpo (1902–1903), Ezza (1905), and other areas where the Aro had a particularly significant presence.

== Nigeria ==
When Nigeria won independence from Great Britain in 1960, ethnic tensions rose between the regions resulting in the Nigerian Civil War in 1967–1970. After the war, the Aros and the rest of the Igbo People suffered discrimination from other Nigerians. Aro culture suffered. However, they are currently efforts to unite Aro people and revive their culture.
