= Igboland =

Igboland Àlaịgbò/Ànaịgbò Àlà na ḿbà ṇ́dị́ Ìgbò
- Cultural region
- Republic of Igboland
- Nickname: The East
- Location of Igboland (dark green) – in Africa (green & dark grey) – in Nigeria (green)
- Part of: Nigeria
- Founding of Nri: c. 900
- British Colony: 1902
- Nigeria: 1914
- Largest City: Onitsha
- Founder: Proto-Igbo
- Regional capital: Enugu
- Composed of: States: All or some parts of: namely, Abia, Anambra, Delta State, Ebonyi, Rivers State, Enugu and Imo

Government
  - Type: Direct Democracy

Area
  - Total: 49,000 km^{2} (19,000 sq mi)
  - Land: 49,000 km^{2} (19,000 sq mi)
- Highest elevation: 1,000 m (3,300 ft)
- Lowest elevation: 0 m (0 ft)

Population (2025 estimate)
  - Total: 40 million
  - Density: 816.33/km^{2} (2,114.3/sq mi)

Demographics
  - Language: Igbo; English
  - Religion: Syncretic Christianity (>90%); Odinani (5-10%)
- Time zone: UTC+1 (WAT)
- God: Chukwu
- Alusi: Ala

- Person: Ónye Ìgbò
- People: Ṇ́dị́ Ìgbò
- Language: Ásụ̀sụ́ Ìgbò
- Country: Àlà Ị̀gbò

Igbo land (Standard Igbo: Àlà Ị̀gbò) is a cultural and common linguistic region in southeastern Nigeria which is the indigenous homeland of the Igbo people. Geographically, it is divided into two sections, eastern (the larger of the two) and western. Its population is characterized by the diverse Igbo culture.

Politically, Igboland is divided into several southern Nigerian states; culturally, it has included several subgroupings, including the Awka-Enugu-Nsukka, Anioma-Enuani, the Umueri-Aguleri-Anam groups, the Ngwa, the Orlu-Okigwe-Owerri communities, the Mbaise, the Ezza, Bende, the Ikwuano-Umuahia (these include Ohuhu, Ubakala, Oboro, Ibeku, etc.), the Omuma, the Abam-Aro-Ohafia (Abiriba and Nkporo), the Waawa, the Ndoki, the Etche, the Ekpeye, and the Ogba.

== Territorial boundaries ==
Igboland is surrounded on all sides by large rivers, and other southern and central Nigeria indigenous tribes, namely Igala, Tiv, Yako, Idoma and Ibibio. In the words of William B. Baikie:

Igbo settlement, extends east and west in the Niger-Delta region which is owned by the Middle-Belt, formerly known as Bendel, from the Old Kalabar river to the banks of the Kwora, Niger River, and live in some territory at Aboh, to the west-ward of the latter stream. On the north it borders on Igara, Igala and A'kpoto, and it is separated from the sea only by petty tribes, all of which trace their origin to this great race.

It is primarily situated in the Lowland forest region of Nigeria. They can also be found in some parts of the Niger-Delta. Here the Niger river fans out into the Atlantic Ocean in a vast network of creeks and mangrove swamps on the Bight of Bonny.

The earliest found settlements in Igboland date to 900 BCE in the central area, from where the majority of the Igbo-speaking population is believed to have migrated. The northern Igbo Kingdom of Nri, which rose around the 10th century CE, is credited with the foundation of much of Igboland's culture, customs, and religious practices. It is the oldest existing monarchy in present-day Nigeria. In southern Igboland several groups developed, of which the most notable was the Aro Confederacy and in Western Igboland the Anioma kingdom of Aboh.

During the late 19th century, Igboland was made part of the Southern Nigeria Protectorate of the British Empire and was amalgamated into modern-day Nigeria in 1914. Nigeria gained independence in 1960. Shortly afterward, Igboland was involved in its biggest war during Biafra's movement for secession. It ended in 1970, when the war was declared "No victory, no vanquish".

== Geography and biodiversity ==
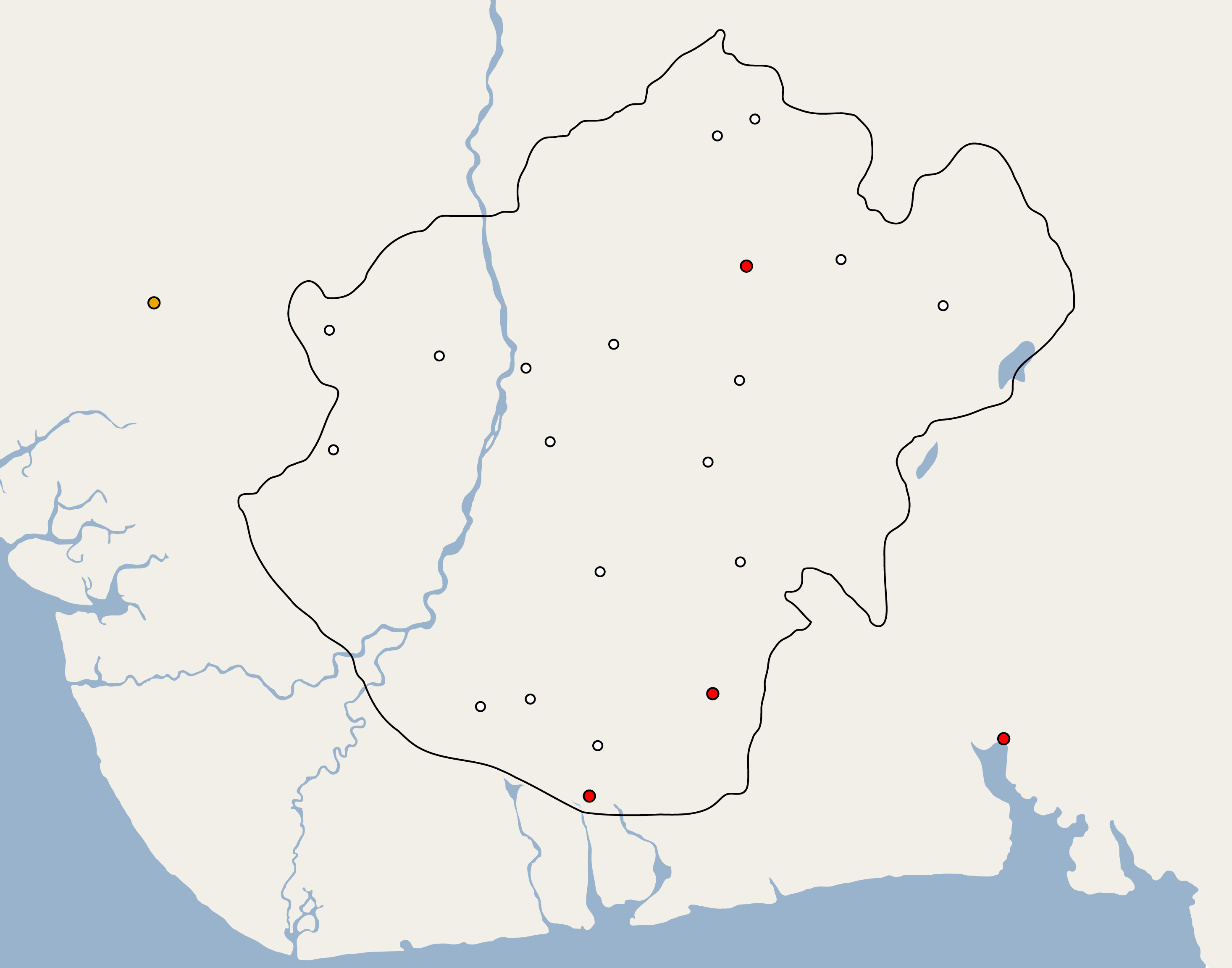

Historically, Igboland has taken up a large part of southeastern Nigeria, mostly on the eastern side of the Niger River. Their territory extends westward across the Niger to the regions of Aniocha, Ndokwa, Ukwuani, and Ika in present-day Delta State. Its eastern side is terminated by the Cross River, although micro-communities exist over on the other side of the river; its northernmost point enters the Savannah climate around Nsukka.

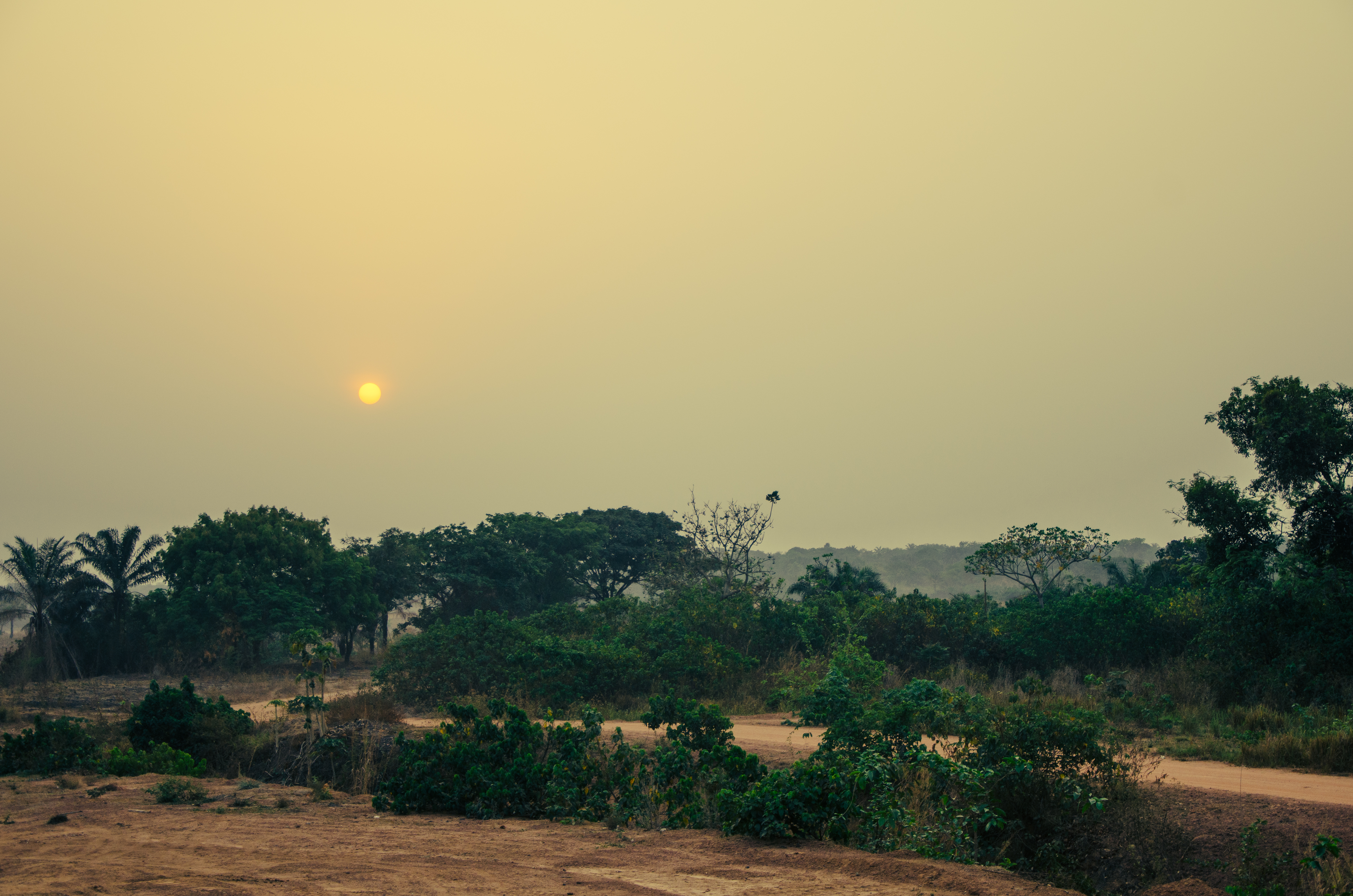
Nkanu West, Enugu

In Nigeria today, Igboland is roughly made up of Abia, Anambra, Ebonyi, Enugu, Imo, Northern Delta and Rivers states. More than 30 million people inhabit Igboland and with a population density ranging from 140 to 390 inhabitants per square kilometre (350 to 1,000/sq mi) it could be the most densely populated area in Africa after the Nile Valley. Altogether Igboland has an area of some 40,900 to 41,400 km^{2} (15,800 to 16,000 sq mi).

== Ancient trade routes ==
Igboland's culture has been shaped by its rainforest climate, its ancient trade along the rivers, migration, and social history within its various clans and peoples. It has been influenced by its ancient trading neighbours, allies, and more recently by relations with Europeans.

Mid-nineteenth century trader W. B. Baikie said, "I seized the moment, and, by our interpreter, told Tshukuma, that we had come to make his acquaintance and his friendship, and to ascertain if the people were willing to trade with us." He signed a trade agreement with Igbo chief, Tshukuma (Chukwuma) Obi from Aboh which engaged in early active trading with Europe. Similarly, Baikie recounted that "after our salutations, I spoke of friendship, of trade, and of education, and particularly enlarged upon the evils of war, and the benefits of peace, all of which was well received", when signing a trade agreement on August 30, 1885, with Ezebogo, an Igbo chief in Asaba.

Due to the native common linguistic standard and interrelated cultures in Igboland, the lower Niger River, which divides Igboland into unequal eastern and western parts, has from ancient times provided easy means of communication, trading and unity amongst the Igbo on both sides of the river. It also enabled ancient trade and migration of people into Igboland, and between Igboland and rest of the world. Some of the notable ancient trade and export routes in Igboland included the famous lower Niger and Njaba-Oguta lake-Orashi navigational routes via Asaba-Onitsha-Aboh, and Awo-omamma-Oguta-Ogba–Egbema–Ndoni-Aboh ferry services, respectively.

== History ==
=== Stone Age ===
There is evidence of Late Stone Age (late Paleolithic) human presence from at least 10,000 years ago. Early settlement of Igboland is dated to prior 6000 BC based on pottery found in the Okigwe, Oka Igwe, and known today as Awka. In 1978 a team led by Thurstan Shaw, with the University of Nigeria at Nsukka, excavated a rock quarry. They found that it was a mine for tool and pottery making for a 'stone civilisation' nearby at Ibagwa. Anthropologists at the University of Benin have discovered fossils and use of monoliths dating to prior 4500 BC at Ngodo in Uturu town. Further evidence of ancient settlements were uncovered at what researchers believe may be an Nsukka metal cultural area from 3000 BC, and later settlements attributed to Ngwa culture at AD 8–18. It is unclear what cultural links there are between these pre-historic artefacts and the people of the region today. Later human settlement in the region may have links with other discoveries made in the wider area, particularly with the culture associated with the terracotta discoveries at Nok, which spanned a wide area of present-day north-central Nigeria.

Some local villagers retain what they believe are original names of settlements, such as Umuzuoka, The Blacksmiths Ụzụoka, Ọkigwe, Ịmọka, etc.

The Nsukka-Okigwe axis forms a basis for a proposed Proto-Igbo cultural heartland antecedent to contemporary Igbo culture. Much of the Igbo population is believed to have expanded from a smaller area in this region, diverging into several independent Igbo-speaking tribes, village-groups, kingdoms and states. The movements were generally broken into two trends in migration: a more northerly group that expanded towards the banks of the Niger and the upper quadrant of the Cross River; the other, following a southerly trail, had risen from the Isu populations based closer to the axis from which the majority of southern Igbo communities emerged. Mbaise are notably the best examples of an Igbo group claiming autochthony; they reject theories of many migratory histories about their origins. Based on the proximity of traditions to those of their neighbours, and familial and political ties, many of these groups are apparently culturally northern or southern Igbo.

=== Igbo-Ukwu finds (AD 300–900) ===
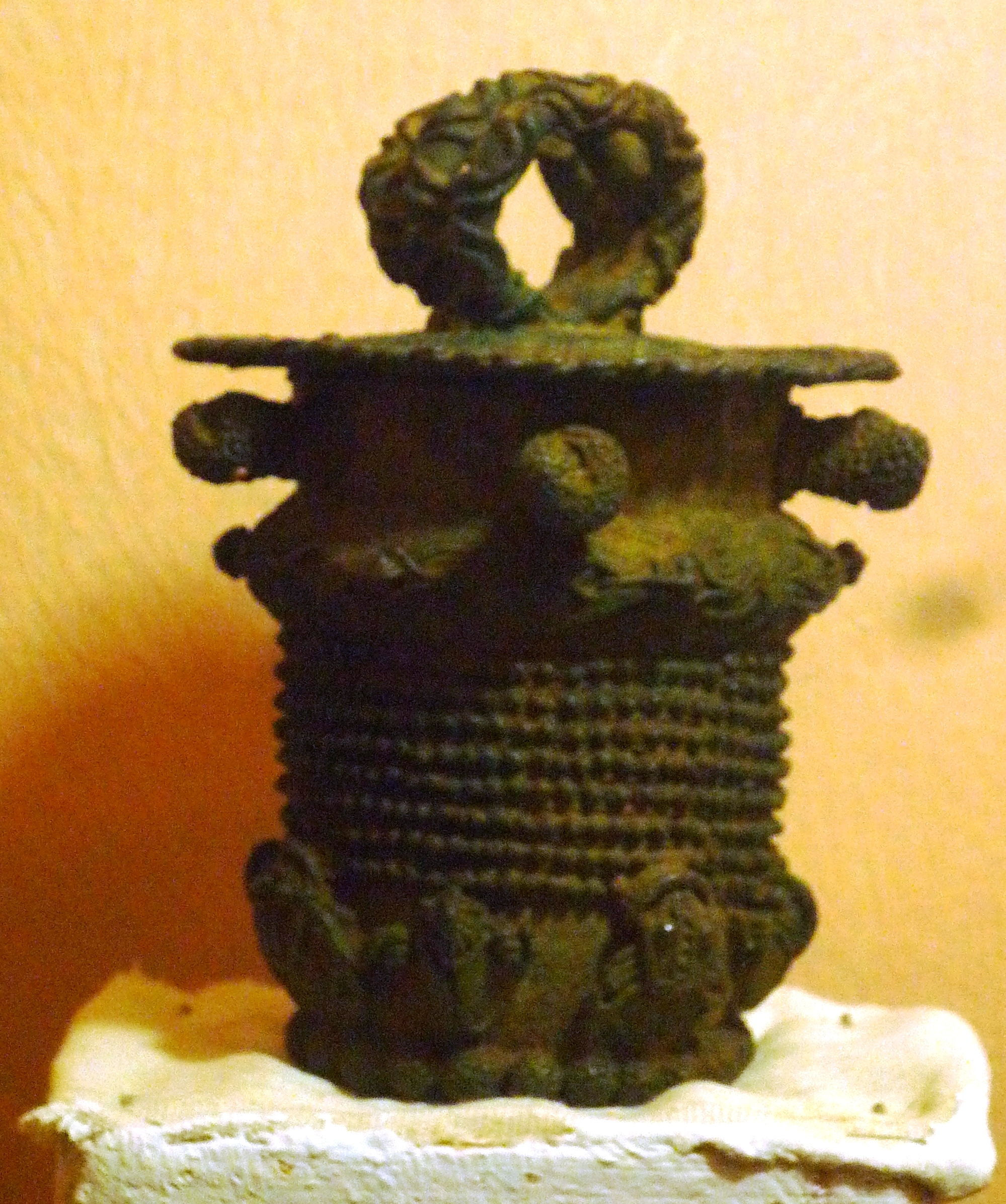
Igbo-Ukwu was the site of an early indigenous bronze industry that was rediscovered in the 20th century. Many of the items recovered were ritual objects such as this 9th century bronze vessel.

The first Igbo Ukwu metal and precious artefacts finds were made accidentally in 1939, when a resident named Isiah Anozie found them in the process of digging a cistern. This led to the discovery of a larger network of linked metal works from the 9th century. The works were based in Igbo Ukwu. Further finds were made by archaeology teams led by Thurstan Shaw in 1959–60, and in 1964 in the compound of Jonah Anozie.

Initially, throughout the 1960s and 1970s, scholars believed that the Igbo Ukwu bronze and copper items found here had been made elsewhere and were trade goods or were influenced by outside technology due to their technical sophistication. The opposite was revealed to be true: local copper deposits had been exploited by the 9th century and anthropological evidence, such as the Ichi-like scarifications on the human figures, show the items were of local Igbo cultural origin. The works have since been attributed to an isolated bronze industry, which had developed without outside influence over time and reached great sophistication.

Igbo trade routes of the early second millennium reached the cities of Mecca, Medina and Jeddah through a network of trade routes journeyed by middlemen. Beads that originated in India in the 9th century have been found in Igbo Ukwu burial sites: Thousands of glass beads were uncovered from the ruined remains of a nobleman's garments. The burial site was associated with the Nri Kingdom, which began around the same century, according to indigenous history.

=== Kingdom of Nri (900–c. 1560) ===
The northern Igbo Kingdom of Nri, rising around the 10th century based on Umunri traditions, is credited with the foundation of much of Igboland's culture, customs, and religious practices. It is the oldest existing monarchy in present-day Nigeria. It was around the mid-10th century that the divine figure Eri is said to have migrated, according to Umunri lore, to the Anambra (Igbo: Omambara) river basin — specifically at its meeting with Ezu river known as Ezu na Omambara in present-day Aguleri. The exact origins of Eri are unknown and much of Nri traditions present him as a divine leader and civiliser sent from heaven to begin civilisation.

Due to historic trade and migration of old, other people also entered the Igboland in about the fourteenth or fifteenth centuries and mixed with the natives. Towards the western end of Igboland, across the Niger River, rose a man known as Eze Chima who fled Benin with his accomplices after a dispute with the Oba of Benin who consequently exiled him in the 1560s. As they left Benin City heading eastwards, Eze Chima and his followers settled in a number of lands and established monarchies with the natives in those areas. Those grew into townships and kingdoms after the 16th century. Collectively, these places are known as Umuezechima which translates as 'the children or descendants of king Chima'.

=== Igbo wars and European contact (1450–1750) ===
Igboland was historically known as the Ibo(e), Ebo(e), and Ibwo Country by early European explorers. Igboland was conquered by the British Empire after several decades of resistance on all fronts; some of the most famous of the resistance include the Ekumeku Movement, the Anglo-Aro War, and the Aba Women's Riots which started in present day Aba and was contributed to by women of neighbouring ethnic backgrounds in eastern Nigeria.

=== Arochukwu and the slave trade (1750–1850) ===
A number of polities rose either directly or indirectly as a result of Nri; the most powerful states were those of the Aro Confederacy which rose in the Cross River region in the 17th century and declined after British colonisation in the early 20th century. The Aro state centred on Arochukwu followed Nri's steady decline, basing much of its economic activities on the rising trade in slaves to Europeans by coastal African middlemen.

The present site of Arochukwu was originally settled by the Ibibio people under the Obong Okon Ita kingdom before the conquest of what became Obinkita in the 17th century by two main Igbo groups: the Eze Agwu clan and the Oke Nnachi assisted by the Ibom Isi (or Akpa) mercenaries under the leadership of the Nnubi dynasty. Led by Agwu Inobia, a descendant of Nna Uru from Abiriba, the Eze Agwu clan was centered at their capital Amanagwu and were resisted by Obong Okon Ita which led to the start of the Aro-Ibibio Wars.

The war initially became a stalemate. Both sides arranged a marriage between the king of Obong Okon Ita and a woman from Amanagwu. The marriage eventually failed to bring peace but played a decisive role in the war. Oke Nnachi was led by Nnachi Ipia who was a dibia or priest among the Edda people and was called by Agwu Inobia to help in the war against the Ibibio. These groups were followed by a third non-Igbo Ekoi-cultured group, Akpa or Ibom Oburutu who were led by Akuma Nnaubi, the first Eze Aro, the title of the king of the Aro.

In southern Igboland several groups developed mostly independent of Nri influence. Most of these groups followed a migration out of Isu communities in present-day Imo State, although some communities, such as the Mbaise cluster of village groups, claim to be autochthonous.

=== Colonial era (1850–1960) ===
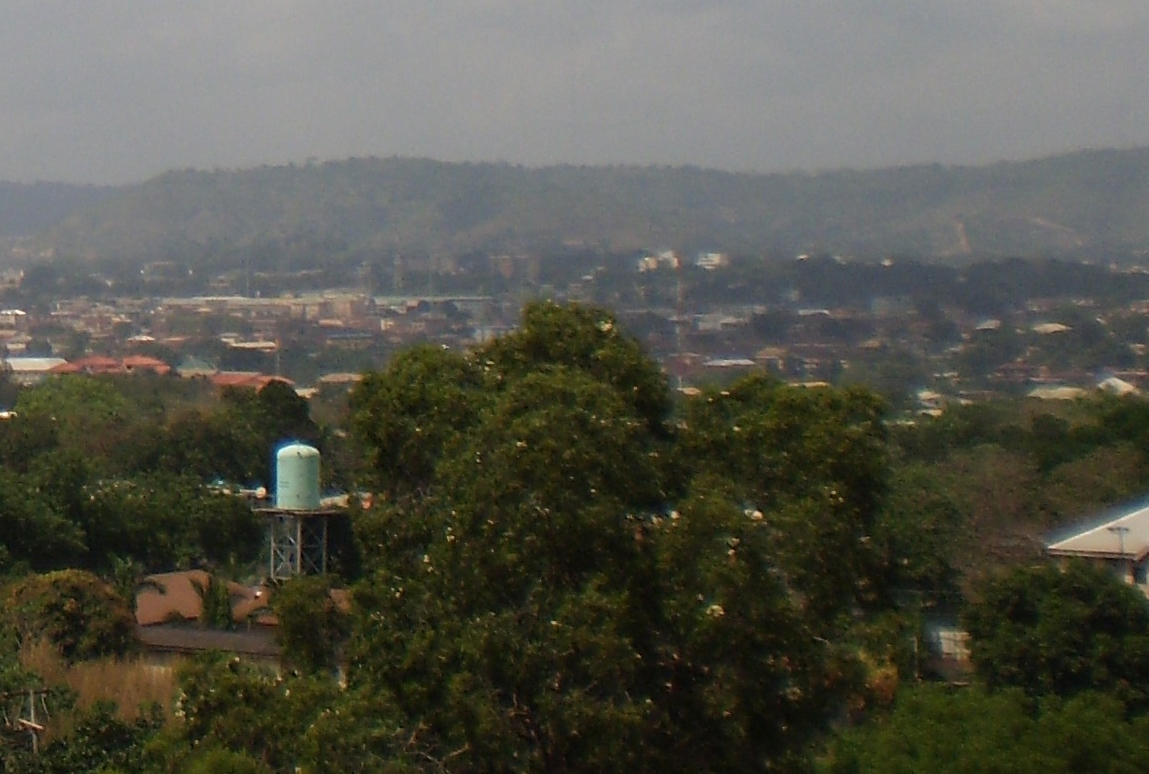
Enugu, the capital city of the old Eastern Region of Nigeria.

Following the British parliament's abolition of the slave trade in 1807, the British Royal Navy had opened up trade with coastal towns Bonny and Opobo and further inland on the Niger with Asaba in the 1870s. The palm oil industry, the biggest export, grew large and important to the British who traded here. British arrival and trade led to increased encounters between the Igbo and other polities and ethnic groups around the Niger River and led to a deepening sense of a distinct Igbo ethnic identity. Missionaries had started arriving in the 1850s. The Igbo, at first wary of the religion, started to embrace Christianity and Western education as traditional society broke down. Christianity had played a great part in the introduction of European ideology into Igbo society and culture often time through erasure of cultural practice; adherents to the denominations were often barred in partaking in ancient rites and traditions, and joining fraternities and secret societies were forbidden as the church grew stronger.

Due to the incompatibility of the Igbo decentralized style of government and the centralized system required for British indirect rule, British colonial rule was marked with open conflicts and much tension. Under British colonial rule, the diversity within each of Nigeria's major ethnic groups slowly decreased and distinctions between the Igbo and other large ethnic groups, such as the Hausa and the Yoruba, became sharper. British rule brought about changes in culture such as the introduction of warrant chiefs as Eze (traditional rulers) where there were no such monarchies.

=== Nigerian independence and Civil War (1960s) ===
Following the independence of Nigeria from the United Kingdom in 1960, most of Igboland was included in its Eastern Region.

Flag of the Republic of Biafra (1967–1970), sometimes regarded as the ethnic flag of the Igbo.

Following a coup in 1966 which saw mostly Igbo soldiers assassinating politicians from the western and northern regions of Nigeria, Johnson Aguiyi-Ironsi seized control of Lagos, the capital, and came into power as military head of state of Nigeria. In revolt and retaliation against the government General Aguiyi-Ironsi was ambushed and assassinated by Northern members of the military on 29 July 1966 in a revolt against that had strong ethnic overtones. Ironsi's assassination stood out more because of the method of his killers; Ironsi had his legs tied to the back of a Land Rover and was driven around town while still attached. The Eastern Region formed the core of the secessionist Republic of Biafra. A regional council of the peoples of Eastern Nigeria decided the region should secede as the Republic of Biafra on May 30, 1967.

Nigerian General Emeka Odumegwu-Ojukwu on this day made a declaration of independence of Biafra from Nigeria and became the head of state of the new republic. French intelligence officer Jean Mauricheau-Beaupré, a deputy to the then lead coordinator of France's Africa policy Jacques Foccart, declared the following to those who were concerned with French support to Biafra: "[French] support was actually given to a handful of Biafran bourgeoisie in return for the oil. ... The real Ibo mentality is much farther to the left than that of Ojukwu and even if we had won, there would have been the problem of keeping him in power in the face of leftist infiltration." Biafra, for its part, openly appreciated its relationship with France.The Nigerian Civil War (or the "Nigerian-Biafran War") lasted from 6 July 1967 until 15 January 1970, after which Biafra once again became part of Nigeria. The Republic of Biafra was defeated after three years of war by the federal government of Nigeria from 1967 to 1970 with military support from the United Kingdom (strategy and ammunition), Soviet Union (ammunition), the United Arab Republic (air force), as well as with support from other states around the world. The effects of Nigerian war strategies such as starvation on Biafran civilians (most of whom were ethnic Igbo) remains a controversial topic. The movement for the sovereignty of Biafra has continued with a minority, most making up the MASSOB organisation.

== Bibliography ==
- Chigere, Nkem Hyginus M. V. (2001). Foreign missionary background and indigenous evangelization in Igboland. LIT Verlag Münster. p. 15. ISBN 3-8258-4964-3.
