= Ibibio Kingdom =

Precolonial polity in modern Nigeria

Kingdom of the Ibibio Ibibio Kingdom
- Pre-1600s (estimated)
- Capital: Obot Okon Ita as the capital city of the Okon Ita Clan and Uruan as the main capital city of the Ibibio and the rest of the Abasi People
- Common languages: Ibibio
- Religion: Traditional Ibibio religion
- Government: Monarchy / Gerontocracy
- History
  - Established: Pre-1600s (estimated)
- Today part of: Nigeria

Ibibio Kingdom (also known as Obio Ibibio) was a precolonial polity of the Ibibio people in what is now southeastern Nigeria. It is considered one of the earliest centralized societies in the region, predating several neighboring kingdoms and states.

== History ==
The Ibibio Kingdom emerged centuries before European contact, with oral and written traditions pointing to a powerful confederation of Ibibio clans ruled by elders and spiritual leaders. Before the colonial era, the Ibibio are believed to have formed proto‑state entities such as the Ibom Kingdom (also called Mbot Abasi Kingdom) with its seat in Uruan. The Ibibio confederation consisted of clans inhabiting regions north, south, east and west of the Great Uruan River. One of its clans, the Okon Ita Clan (northern vanguard), was situated to the north-east of the Great Uruan River. This clan had its seat at Obot Okon Ita. During the seventeenth and eighteenth centuries, the Okon Ita Clan of the Ibibio engaged in conflicts that came to be known as the Aro–Ibibio Wars.

=== Colonial and modern era ===
Under British colonial rule, the Ibibio regions were incorporated into the Protectorate of Southern Nigeria and later into Nigeria after independence. Traditional governance structures such as secret societies (Ekpo) continued to influence local politics and social control..

Its capital was Uruan, a central seat of governance and religion. The Nsomm and Obongs (kings or chiefs) held authority alongside councils and cult institutions like the Ekpe society.

== Political Structure ==
The Ibibio Kingdom was not a monarchy in the traditional sense; the prime ruler of the Ibibio people was considered a high priest or nsomm (Nsomm Uruan). Moreover, the form of government was a gerontocratic confederacy, with each clan maintaining autonomy under its Obong. Authority was spiritual, judicial, and administrative, centered around:

- High Priest (Nsomm)
- Kings (Obong)
- Elders (Mbong)
- Clan Priests
- Ekpe society (a secret society that enforced laws and preserved traditions)

== Conflict ==
In the late 17th century, the Okon Ita Clan of the Ibibio Kingdom faced major conflict during the Aro-Ibibio Wars. These were triggered by migration and territorial tensions with Igbo groups, especially those that later formed the Aro Confederacy. After the wars, the Ibibio Kingdom retained strong cultural and clan-based structures.

== Culture and Legacy ==
The Ibibio Kingdom influenced:

- Traditional governance systems still present in Akwa Ibom
- Cultural practices like the Ekpo masquerade
- The Ibibio language and oral traditions

Though the centralized kingdom declined, its legacy lives on through Ibibio identity, clan structures, and cultural institutions.

== Language and culture ==
The Ibibio language belongs to the Lower Cross branch of the Niger–Congo family and is closely related to Efik and Annang.

Cultural practices include masquerades (e.g., Ekpo and Ekpe societies), wood‑carving, and the use of the nsibidi script in earlier times.

== See also ==
- Ibibio-Efik languages
- Ekpo Society
- List of ethnic groups in Nigeria
- Ibibio people
- Ekpe society
- Aro Confederacy
- Efik people
- Ibom Kingdom
