= Aro people =

Ethnic subgroup in Nigeria

- Omu Aro Emblem

Total population
- Upwards of 1.1 million

Regions with significant populations
- Nigeria

Languages
- Igbo, Ibibio, Cross River languages, English

Religion
- Christianity, Traditional

Related ethnic groups
- Ibibio, Efik, Ekoi, Bahumono, Ijo, Igala, Idoma, other Igbo peoples

The Aro people or Aros are an Igbo group that originated from the Arochukwu kingdom in present-day Abia state, Nigeria. The Aros can also be found in about 250 other settlements mostly in the Southeastern Nigeria and adjacent areas. The Aros today are classified as Eastern or Cross River Igbos because of their location, mixed origins, culture, and dialect. Their god, Chukwu Abiama, was a key factor in establishing the Aro Confederacy as a regional power in the Niger Delta and Southeastern Nigeria during the 18th and 19th centuries.

== Origins and history ==
The history of the Aros predates Igbo migration and founding of the kingdom of Arochukwu. During the Bantu expansion, a group of Proto bantu migrated to the area and established the Mbot Abasi Kingdom. The Proto bantu group originally came from Usak Edet (Isanguele), a segment of the Ejagham in present-day Southern Cameroon. Igbo migrations led by Eze Agwu from Abiriba and Nnachi from Edda migrated into the Aro region started in the mid-17th century. These Igbo migrants were resisted by the indigenous proto Ibibios. The Aro-Ibibio Wars and the migration of the Akpa from east of the Cross River, formed the nation during the turning point of the 17th century to the 18th century. The Efik were originally from the Ibom Kingdom and might have left before or during the Aro-Ibibio Wars. By this time, the palm oil and slave trade was popular in the hinterland. By the mid-18th century, there were mass migrations of Aro businessmen to the Igbo hinterland and adjacent areas. This migration, influence of their god Chukwu Abiama through priests, and their military power supported by alliances with several related neighboring Igbo and eastern Cross River militarized states (particularly Ohafia, Abam, Ihechiowa, Abiriba, Nkporo, Afikpo, Ekoi, etc.) quickly established the Aro Confederacy as a regional economic power. However, Aro economic hegemony was threatened by the penetration of Europeans, mainly British colonists towards the end of the 19th century. Tensions finally led to bloodshed, and the Anglo-Aro war took place from 1901 to 1902. The Aro Confederacy stoutly resisted but eventually suffered defeat. This helped the British to occupy the rest of what became Eastern Nigeria.

== Tradition ==
One factor is the Ekpe society, which is a sacred society originally from east of the Cross River. The highly religious and judicial society took a major part in Aro society. The use of the writing system, Nsibidi, was based on secret societies like Ekpe. Uri, another writing system, occurred mostly in the form of body art.

Another factor is the Chukwu Abiama Temple, which was mediated by the Aro priesthood. They influenced neighbors and allies before the British invasion and destruction of the Chukwu Abiama Temple and Aro priesthood. The Ekeleke masquerade activity was important in Aro settlements. Brought from the Aros in the western Niger Delta, it eventually spread to the Oguta area. They also were known for wearing the popular "George" cloth. The Ikperikpe warrior dance was very famous among warriors in the old days and continues to be in use.

== Largest settlements in Western Africa ==
Name	Town/LGA	State/Country	Notes	Notable People
Aro Ajatakairi	Ikwuano	Abia State, Nigeria		
Aro Achara	Isialangwa	Abia State, Nigeria		
Aro Okporoenyi	Bende	Abia State, Nigeria		
Aro Ayama	Ikwuano	Abia State, Nigeria		Late Mazi (Sir) Ugochukwu Kanu and late Col. Okoro
Aro Amuro	Ikwuano	Abia State, Nigeria		
Aro Ngwa		Abia State, Nigeria		
Aro Ama-Asa	Isialangwa	Abia State, Nigeria		
Aro Umunkpeyi	Isialangwa	Abia State, Nigeria		
Aro Nbawsi	Isialangwa	Abia State, Nigeria		
Aro Omoba	Isialangwa	Abia State, Nigeria		
Aro UmuEru	Isialangwa	Abia State, Nigeria		
Aro UmuAro	Isialangwa	Abia State, Nigeria		
Aro Onicha Ngwa				
Aro Isuochi		Abia State, Nigeria		
Aro Ahuma Abam		Abia State, Nigeria		
Aro Nde Ijere	Ohafia	Abia State, Nigeria		
Aro Uzuakoli		Abia State, Nigeria		
Aro Ndizuogu	Ideato, Okigwe and Onuimo LGAs	Imo State, Nigeria	Largest Aro settlement	Izuogu Mgbokpo, Igwegbe Odum, Mbonu Ojike
Aro Ndi Ikerionwu		Anambra State, Nigeria		
Aro Anwu Anwu	Eziukwu Durunnihe, Umudurunna, Abba Nwangele LGA	Imo state, Nigeria	Direct bloodline of Durunnihe	The Royal House of Nnawuihe; Chidiebere Nnawuihe
Aro Ajali		Anambra State, Nigeria		
Aro Azia		Anambra State, Nigeria		
Aro Abagana		Anambra State, Nigeria		
Aro Ndi-Owu		Anambra State, Nigeria		
Aro Ikpa		Enugu State, Nigeria		
Aro Amokwe	Udi Enugu	Enugu State, Nigeria		
Aro Ezeagu		Enugu State, Nigeria		
Aro Achi		Enugu State, Nigeria		
Aro Nkalagu		Enugu State, Nigeria		
Aro Okposi		Ebonyi State, Nigeria		
Aro Onueke	Ezza	Ebonyi State, Nigeria		
Aro Nsukka		Ebonyi State, Nigeria		
Aro Nzerem		Ebonyi State, Nigeria		
Aro Ikwo		Ebonyi State, Nigeria		
Aro Ndi okoro		Akwa Ibom State, Nigeria		
Aro Ikot Ukana		Akwa Ibom State, Nigeria		
Aro Obuoro ite		Akwa Ibom State, Nigeria		
Aro Idoma		Benue State, Nigeria	Ukpabi of Ochu Idoma	
Aro Nde Ikokwo-Uli		Anambra State, Nigeria		
Aro Ndi Egungwu-Uli		Anambra State, Nigeria		
Aro Ubuluisiuzo-Ihiala		Anambra State, Nigeria		
Aro Umuezeawara-Ihiala		Anambra State, Nigeria		
Aro Iseke-Iheala				
Aro izzi		Ebonyi State, Nigeria		
Aro Amuro-Okigwe		Imo State, Nigeria		
Aro ndi-Okparaeze-Orumba North		Anambra State, Nigeria		
Aro Umudike-Ikwuano		Abia State, Nigeria		
Aro oji/Aro Ndeokoroji, na Aro Ndinwafor-Okigwe		Imo State, Nigeria		
Aro Nike-Nike		Enugu State, Nigeria		
Aro Amawom-Eziala-Isialangwa		Abia State, Nigeria		
Aro Azia-Ihiala		Anambra State, Nigeria		
Aro Ikwo		Ebonyi State, Nigeria		
Aro Effium	Ohaukwu LGA	Ebonyi State, Nigeria		
Aro Isu na Aro onichi-Onicha LGA		Ebonyi State, Nigeria		
Aro Uburu	Ohazara LGA	Ebonyi State, Nigeria		
Aro Abakaliki na Aro Ezillo		Ebonyi State, Nigeria		
Aro Nkerefi	Nkanu East LGA	Enugu State, Nigeria		
Aro Umulolo-Okigwe		Imo State, Nigeria		
Aro Nkalunta na Nde Totty na Aro Oboro	Ikwuano	Abia State, Nigeria		
Aro Ndi itee na Nde Okereke	Abam - Arochukwu LGA	Abia State, Nigeria		
Aro Ndi okpalaeke na Ndi Aguluezechukwu	Aguata LGA	Anambra State, Nigeria		
Aro Ndi Akweke	Orsumogho Ihiala	Anambra State, Nigeria		
Aro Ndi Oji	Ukpor/Ihembosi			
Aro Ozubulu		Anambra State, Nigeria		
Aro Itu-Nta Ibere	Ikwuano Umuahia LGA	Abia State, Nigeria		
Aro Ikot Ukana		Akwa Ibom State, Nigeria		
Aro Onicha Ngwa	Ìsì ala Ngwa	Abia State, Nigeria		
Aro Ntalakwu	Bende	Abia State, Nigeria		
Aro Mbala-Isuochi		Abia State, Nigeria		
Aro Ikot Umo Essien		Akwa Ibom State, Nigeria		
Aro Onicha Ngwa		Abia State, Nigeria		
Aro Udi		Enugu State, Nigeria		
Aro Effium				
Aro Isuikwuato				
Aro Uturu Okigwe				
Aro Amaokwe				
Aro Itu-Nta Ibere	Ikwuano	Abia State, Nigeria		
Aro Eziala Nsulu	Isiala Ngwa	Abia State, Nigeria	Nde Ujah in Atani	
Aro Mbiabong		Akwa Ibom State, Nigeria	Nde Akweke, Obinkita	

- Arochukwu
- Aro Confederacy
- Ezi Njoku History
