= Ibibio =

Ibibio may refer to:

- Ibibio language, a Niger-Congo language of Nigeria
- Ibibio people an ethnic group of southern Nigeria
- Ibibio Kingdom, a precolonial polity of the Ibibio people

== See also ==
- Ibibio Americans
- Ibibio Sound Machine, an English electronic afro-funk band who sing in Ibibio
- Ibiblio, a digital library and archive
- Ibibo, an Indian travel booking website
