= Okon =

Okon may refer to:

== People ==
- Okon (given name)
- Okon (surname)
- Effiong Okon Eyo (1918–1983), Nigerian monarch
- Ekpo Okon Abasi Otu V (born 1949), Nigerian traditional ruler
- Henry Okon Archibong (born 1966), Nigerian medical doctor and politician
- Obong Okon Ita , Nigerian monarch
- Patience Okon George (born 1991), Nigerian sprinter
- Umana Okon Umana, Nigerian politician, economist, and business leader

== Places ==
- Okoń, Łódź Voivodeship, a village in Poland
- Obong Okon Ita, former Kingdom now in Nigeria

== Other uses ==
- Okon Fuoko, a ballet-pantomime by the Finnish composer Leevi Madetoja
