= Nnamdi Udoh =

Personal details
- Born: 8 May 1960 (age 66)
- Education: Nigerian College of Aviation Technology; School of Aviation, Langen; City University of London (MS 2006)
- Profession: Air Safety Expert

Elder Mazi Nnamdi Udoh (born 8 May 1960) is the former Chief Executive officer/Managing Director at the Nigerian airspace management agency.

== Life ==
Elder Mazi Nnamdi Udoh (Ugwu Aro) was born to Senator Henry Nwafor Udoh and Madam Uzoma Udoh.He is the President General Nzuko Arochukwu Worldwide and a lover of football. He hails from Ibom in Arochukwu and is also a devoted Christian.

== Education ==
He joined NAMA in 1980 after completing a course at the Nigerian College of Aviation Technology Zaria where he was president of the Student Union. While there he organized the first ever Aviation and Technical institution games hosted at Zaria in 1980. He furthered his education by obtaining an Air Traffic Safety Electronics License at the School of Aviation in Langen, Germany. He also attended City University of London where he studied Air Safety, obtaining a Masters of Science degree in 2006.

== Career ==
Mazi Nnamdi Udoh was appointed to the position of CEO/MD at the Nigerian airspace management agency on 5 October 2011. Prior to that, he held posts as Executive director electronic and engineering services,[General Manager] of project and surveillance, special advisor on projects monitoring to the minister of Aviation after serving as Airspace manager to Ilorin international airport etc. His name is commonly used in conjunction with the multi-billion naira Total Radar Coverage of Nigeria project (TRACON) which delivers modern Air Traffic Systems at all Nigerian airports nationwide. He is also famous with the saying "NO MONEY NO SAFETY".

On 18 October 2010, he was the Acting Managing Director of NAMA during the commissioning of the TOTAL RADAR COVERAGE OF NIGERIA 'TRACON' by Nigerian President Goodluck Ebele Jonathan. He was praised by the president and his colleagues for finally attaining such success in the aviation industry. He is a member of Royal Aeronautical Society (MRAeS), National Association of Air Traffic Engineers, International Federation of Air Traffic Safety Electronic Association IFATSEA United kingdom registered engineer among the few from Nigeria, just to name a few. He has held the position of general secretary at NAAE for eight years and later became the president for another four years, regional director IFATSEA. He is currently the Deputy Chairman Civil Air Navigation Services Organisation (CANSO) Africa. He was the first male Nigerian member of Women in Aviation International (WAI) featured on the first edition of Woman Aviator, the official publication of Women in Aviation, Nigeria.
