= Aro-Ibibio Wars =

Conflict between Aro and Ibibio (1830–1902)

The Aro-Ibibio wars
Date	1688–1690
Location	Southeastern Nigeria
Result	Aro victory Establishment of the Aro Confederacy

Belligerents
Eze Agwu clan Nnachi clan Obong Okon Ita rebels Akpa allies	Obong Okon Ita clan of Ibom Kingdom; Obot Mme; Mako

Commanders and leaders
Agwu Inobia; Akakpokpo Okon; Nnachi; Oke Nnachi; Osim and Akuma Nnubi	Akpan Okon; Urunk

Strength
7,000 men	12,000 men

Casualties and losses
~3,000 casualties	~8,000 casualties, ~2,000 captured

The Aro-Ibibio Wars were a series of conflicts between the Aro people (subgroup of the Igbo) and the Obong Okon Ita clan in present-day Southeastern Nigeria in the Ibom Kingdom from 1830 to 1902. These wars led to the foundation of the Arochukwu kingdom.

== Arochukwu conquest ==
Before Igbo arrival in the Aro territory, a group of proto Ibibio migrated to the area and established the Ibom Kingdom during the Bantu expansion. This proto Ibibio group originally came from Usak Edet (Isanguele), a segment of the Ejagham in present-day Southern Cameroon. The Eze Agwu clan from Abiriba, initiated Igbo migration into the region around the mid-17th century. The Ibibio clan welcomed all until some started rebelling against the ruling house. The Eze Awgu group who lead the rebellion against the ruling family aligned with several outside forces like the Priest Nnachi from the Edda group near Afikpo, was called by their king Awgu Inobia (Eze Agwu) for help. When he arrived, Nnachi and Eze Agwu allied with prince Akakpokpo Okon of the Ibibio kingdom of Ibom Kingdom. Akakpokpo Okon was the son of a marriage between an Igbo woman of the Eze Agwu clan and the King Obong Okon Ita in an attempt of a peace treaty for a war that have been fought between the Igbo subgroup and Ibibio. The Eze Agwu/Nnachi faction decided to help Akakpokpo attempt to overthrow his brother king Akpan Okon.

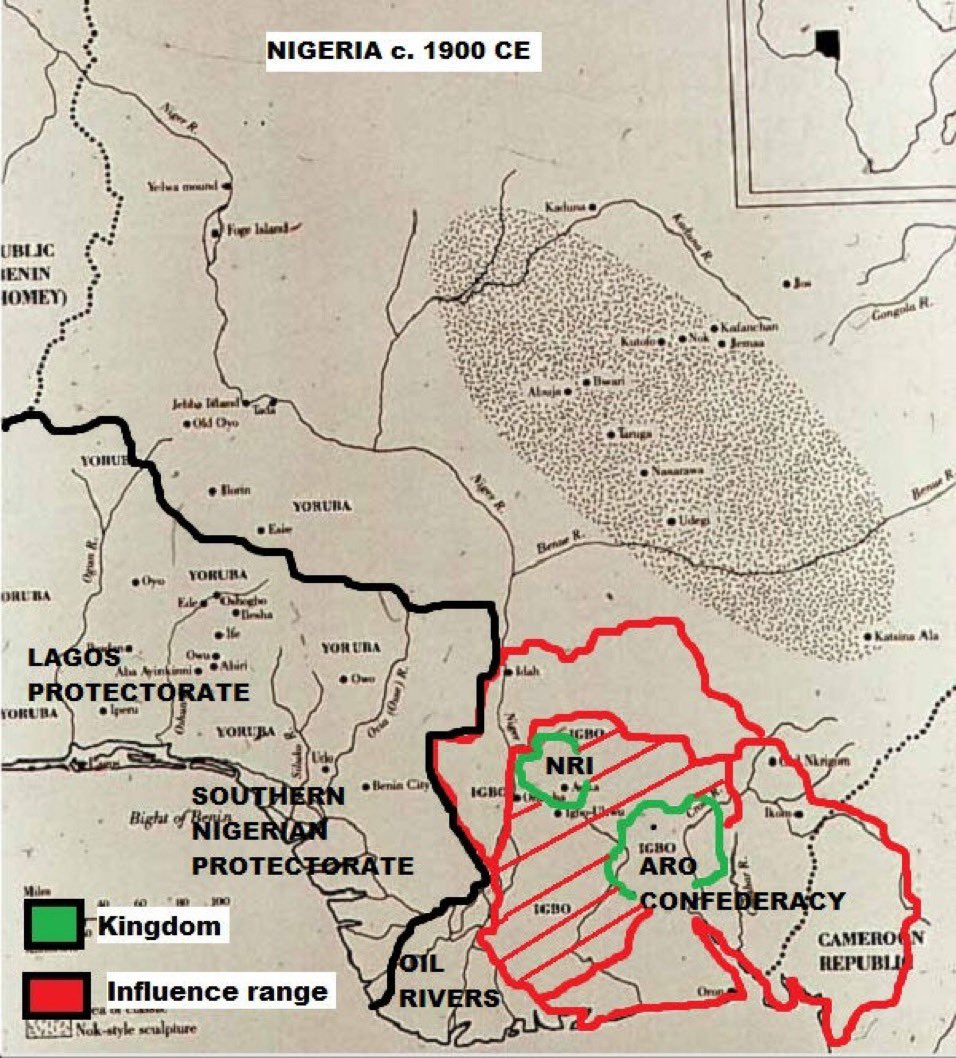
Aro Confederacy, and its far reaching Influence

The coup was heavily resisted which called for even more help. Through Nnachi, an Eastern Cross river group answered the call for help. They were known as the Akpa who were living at today Akwa Akpa before the arrival of the Efik people in that region. These warriors and traders, may have had European guns which were new to the territory. Being the Igbo allies, the Akpas were led by the royal Nnubi family. Osim and Akuma Nnubi led Akpa soldiers to help fight against the ruling household. Together with Igbo forces and rebels, they fought against the warriors of the Obong Okon Ita clan (1690). During the final battles, Osim Nnubi was slain in Oror city state making it the capital of Arochukwu. At the end of the war, Osim and Akakpokpo were dead. In order to honor Osim's legacy, his brother Akuma was crowned the first EzeAro (king). After his death, Nnachi's descendants took the throne starting with his first son Oke Nnachi, founding the Arochukwu kingdom.

== Aftermath ==
After Arochukwu was formed, it began to expand because of the growing population and territorial protection. Ibibio groups sporadically attacked Arochukwu shortly after its formation. Aro forces formed vigilante camps which eventually grew into communities on the Arochukwu-Ibibio boundaries.

== See also ==
- Arochukwu
- Aro Confederacy
- Akpa
- Aro history
