= Rosemary Inyama =

Nigeria Igbo academic and administrator (1913–?)

- Born: 11 November 1913; Arochukwu, Igboland, Nigeria

Rosemary Inyama (born 11 November 1913, date of death unknown) was a Nigerian Igbo educator, politician, businesswoman and community developer.

== Biography ==
Inyama was born Rosemary Ike on 11 November 1913 to Mazi Okoronkwo Ike and Madam Otonahu Ike in Arochukwu, Igboland, Nigeria. She attended the Mary Slessor Memorial School where she later became a teacher. When she married in 1934, she resigned from teaching. However Inyama was heavily involved in community. She started a Domestic Science Business Training Center in 1935 which became a profitable enterprise and taught women skills they could use in work or at home.

In 1942 Inyama got a license for buying gold and started a business importing gold from Ghana and creating jewellery from it. She became one of the first women in the area to have a bank account, with African Continental Bank in Aba. Inyama was involved in a trading partnership buying and selling foodstuffs until the Nigerian Civil War (1967–70) ended the business. She founded the Girl Guides in the district, and helped found a motherless babies home in 1965. During the Nigerian civil war she brought together the various groups of Ututu, Ihechiowa, Isu, Ewe and Arochukwu communities under the banner of the Association of Arochukwu women. Inyama was a member of the National Council of Nigeria and the Cameroons (NCNC) and organised the women's wing. A successful business woman amassing a significant fortune, Inyama educated all her children in university and dedicating herself to improving the lives of women and her community in general. She was given a number of awards for her service.

Inyama married fellow teacher P.K. Inyama and one of their children, Hycientha Inyama Nwauba became the consul-general for Nigeria in New York, United States. Their other children were Nnenna Inyama, Jennifer Inyama and Okoro Inyama.
