= Nnabo =

Masquerade in Southern Nigeria

Nnabo is an Ibibio and Efik masquerade. The Nnabo masquerade in the early days were charged with performing martial duties including executions. Nnabo dates back to the precolonial days, they usually carry at least one coffin and are always armed with swords and machete. The coffin carried by the Nnabo masquerade contains human skulls and charm. Nnabo presently is used for several purposes including traditional ceremonies and spiritual protection. During their performances the masquerade aim to intimidate or inspire fear to bystanders.

Nnabo in the past relinquished its martial power to the government. The Nnabo masquerade usually make appearances during swearing in or coronation of new Kings (Obong), Christmas festivals and new year festivals.

In the colonial days, Nnabo led warriors to the battlefield during confrontations or war. This was a strategy to intimidate the opponents and also to remove any vicious spiritual force. In some cases, Nsibidi Nnabo carried out executions of condemned people by order of the king (obong).
