= Akpan Okon =

Akpan Okon was an Obong (king) of Ibom Kingdom around 1690–1720. An attempt was made to overthrow him by his brother Akakpokpo Okon with the support of groups such as the Eze Agwu, Nnachi Ipia, and the Nnubi dynasty in the final phases of the Aro-Ibibio Wars. Although this alliance was very significant and crucial, the battle ended in a stalemate. The alliance between the Eze Agwu lineage and his ambitious brother Akakpokpo invigorated the Aro people, and laid the foundation of the Arochukwu kingdom.
