= Arochukwu =

Arochukwu Aro Oke Igbo
- City and local government area
- Interactive map of Arochukwu
- Location of Arochukwu in Nigeria
- Coordinates: 5°23′N 7°55′E
- Country: Nigeria
- State: Abia State
- Composition: 5 clans

Government
  - Type: Monarchy (One of the few Igbo kingdoms in Nigeria, which practices the monarchical system of government) leader_title = Eze Aro

Area
  - Total: 524 km^{2} (202 sq mi)

Population (2006)
  - Total: 169,339
  - Density: 323/km^{2} (837/sq mi)
  - Ethnicities: Igbo
  - Religions: Christianity Traditional religions

Languages
- Time zone: UTC+1 (WAT)
- 3-digit postal code prefix: 442
- ISO 3166 code: NG.AB.AR

Arochukwu is a historic city and local government area. Sometimes referred to as Arochuku or Aro Oke Igbo, it is the third largest local government area in Abia State (after Aba and Umuahia) in southeastern Nigeria and homeland of the Igbo subgroup, Aro people. Arochukwu is in the Abia North senatorial district of Abia State, Nigeria.

It is composed of five clans namely Abam, Aro, Ihechiowa, Ututu and Isu. Arochukwu is a principal historic town in Igbo land. It was also one of the cities in the Southern protectorate targeted by the British colonial government. Several historic tourist sites exist in the city. The mystic Ibini Ukpabi shrine, the slave routes and other relics of the slave trade era are frequently visited by tourists. It is also in the food belt of Abia state where most of the staple foods are produced.

== History ==
Before Igbo arrival in the Aro territory, a group of proto Ibibio migrated to the area and established the Ibom Kingdom during the Bantu expansion. This proto Ibibio group originally came from Usak Edet (Isanguele), a segment of the Ejagham in present-day Southern Cameroon. The first Igbo settlers to arrive to the area was the Eze Agwu Group led by their leader Agwu Inobia from Abiriba. Tensions between the Igbo settlers and the indigenous Ibibio led to the Aro-Ibibio Wars. The Efik were originally from the Ibom Kingdom and might have left before or during the Aro-Ibibio Wars. The war was initially a stalemate and the Eze Agwu group eventually invited a priest named Nnachi from the Edda clan of northeastern Igboland. Eze Agwu and Nnachi allied with prince Akakpokpo Okon of the Ibom Kingdom. Akakpokpo Okon was the son of a marriage between an Igbo women of the Eze Agwu clan and the King Obong Okon Ita in an attempt of a peace treaty. The Eze Agwu/Nnachi faction decided to help Akakpokpo attempt to overthrow his brother king Akpan Okon. Nnachi invited the Akpa people from the east of the Cross River. The Akpa forces led by Osim and Akuma Nnubi, helped the rebellious group capture the rest of the area. This formed the alliance of 19 new and old states in the area known as the Arochukwu kingdom around 1650–1700. The first king (or Eze Aro) of a unified Arochukwu was Akuma but after his death, Nnachi son's Oke Nnachi took over and his descendants have the throne to this day.

By the mid-18th century, Arochukwu people founded many other communities both within and outside Igboland. These migrations, influence of their god Ibini Ukpabi through priests, and their military power backed up by alliances with several related neighboring Igbo and eastern Cross River militarized states (particularly Ohafia, Abam, Abiriba, Ihechiowa, Afikpo, Ekoi, etc.) quickly established the Aro Confederacy as a regional economic power. However, Aro economic hegemony was threatened by the penetration of Europeans, mainly British colonists in the wake of the 20th century. Tensions finally led to bloodshed and the Anglo-Aro War took place from 1901 to 1902. The Aro Confederacy stoutly resisted but were eventually defeated. This helped the British to occupy the rest of what is now known as Eastern Nigeria.

Abam is a populated Igbo clan in Abia state. It is located in Arochukwu/Ohafia federal constituency of Nigeria. Abam is the biggest clan by population and landmass in Arochukwu LGA, and one of the biggest clan in Abia North senatorial district.

Abam is a brother clan to Ohafia, as both Abam and Ohafia share a common ancestry, culture, dialect, etc. The progenitor of the people of Abam is known as Onyerubi Atita. As a people, Abam clan in Abia state is sometimes referred to as Abam Onyerubi.

Historically, Abam people were fierce and dreaded warriors. They gloried in war conquests, and participated much in mercenary and military policing duties across Eastern Nigeria. They were contracted across Igboland and beyond for defence purposes, on behalf of communities that were under oppression or annihilation from their neighbouring or far away enemies. Abam warriors were the pioneers of the popular Ikpirikpi Ogu, also known as Abam War Dance, that was adapted by the Ohafia clan as Ohafia War Dance and to Abriba clan as Abriba War Dance. Abam was not alone in having a sophisticated military culture. Other clans around Abam also developed this culture just like the Abam. Clans like Ohafia, Abriba, Edda, Alayi, Igbere, Ihechiowa, Ututu etc also developed this warrior culture and they all, including Abam built a regional military power bloc that the whole of Igbo land dreaded. Sometimes, these power bloc of warrior clans were utilised and exploited by the Aro people for their own Aro territorial expeditions across Southern Nigeria. It is speculated that without the Abam warriors and other neighbouring Warrior clans like the Abam, that there would have not been an Aro confederecy. Abam people were not just warriors, but were also hardworking farmers and traders.

Abam has extensive agricultural land used for the cultivation of crops including palm, rubber, rice, cassava, and cocoa.

Ihechiowa is an autonomous Igbo speaking community in Arochukwu Local Government Area, Abia State. It is the second largest clan by land size in Arochukwu Local Government area. It is a community of people with common history and ancestor. Ihechiowa consists of seventeen villages, each with its village head (the Eze Ogo).

Ihechiowa is among the Igbo population that may have, therefore, been part of waves of migration across the Niger and back, these include Ohafia, Abam, Ututu and so on. They were described as warlike in pre colonial times.

They sojourned at various times, in places like Uturu, Ibeku, and Ihenta (now in Ohafia). They finally settled down in their present location. Although no archaeological research work was undertaken to validate the people’s traditions of origin, migration, and settlement; nonetheless oral evidence supports the assertion that the ancestors of Ihechiowa, together with those of Abam, Edda, Ohafia, and Ututu share cultural and linguistic relationships.

Ututu people are a group of people inhabiting Ututu Clan in Arochukwu L. G A. of Abia State. The original boundaries of Ututu are - in the east by the Cross River and Isu Clan, in the South by Enyong and Itu Rivers / Creeks, in the North by Ihechiowa Clan and in the West by Arochukwu Clan and Nkana River / Iwerre Clan.

The geographical area known as Ututu described above is named after the founder of the Clan Mazi Otutu Ezema.

Historically, Ututu people were fierce and dreaded warriors. They gloried in war conquests, and participated much in mercenary and military policing duties across Eastern Nigeria. They were contracted across Igboland and beyond for defence purposes, on behalf of communities that were under oppression or annihilation from their neighbouring or far away enemies. Abam warriors were the pioneers of the popular Ikpirikpi Ogu, also known as Abam War Dance, that was adapted by the Ohafia clan as Ohafia War Dance and to Abriba clan as Abriba War Dance. Ututu was not alone in having a sophisticated military culture. Other clans around Ututu also developed this culture just like the Ututu people. Clans like Ohafia, Abriba, Abam, Edda, Alayi, Igbere etc also developed this warrior culture and they all, including Ututu built a regional military power bloc that the whole of Igbo land dreaded. Sometimes, these power bloc of warrior clans were utilised and exploited by the Aro people for their own Aro territorial expeditions across Southern Nigeria. It is speculated that without the Ututu warriors and other neighbouring Warrior clans like the Ututu, that there would have not been an Aro confederecy. Ututu people were not just warriors, but were also hardworking farmers and traders.

It is perhaps Dr. C. O. Okoreaffia, a renowned anthropologist that best describes the stratification of Ututu Villages. According to him, Ututu is an autonomous community of 19 Villages. These Villages are zoned into four anthropological groupings, which have stood the test of settlement stratification from the very beginning of the Ututu settlement.

== Demography ==
The kingdom is Igbo mixed with Ibibio and Akpa. The main language in Arochukwu is Igbo while Ibibio is also spoken.

The population of Arochukwu town is 10,776. The local government area had a population of 193,820 in 2011, up from 97,800 in 1991.

== Climate ==
Daily highs hover around 83 °F, rarely dropping below 79 °F or rising over 87 °F. The day of July 23 had the lowest daily average high temperature at 82 °F.

Daily lows hover around 73 °F, rarely dropping below 70 °F or rising beyond 76 °F. On August 6, the lowest daily average low temperature is 72 °F.

For comparison, the usual temperature range in Arochukwu is 68 °F to 85 °F on January 1, which is the coldest day of the year, and 72 °F to 87 °F on February 17, the warmest day of the year.

=== Clouds ===
In Arochukwu, the amount of cloud cover is basically constant throughout the summer, with an average of 81% of the time the sky is overcast or mostly cloudy. On July 29, there is a 78% chance of cloudy or mainly cloudy weather.

For comparison, the likelihood of gloomy or largely cloudy weather on May 13, the cloudiest day of the year, is 87%, while the likelihood of clear, mostly clear, or partly cloudy skies on December 27, the clearest day of the year, is 43%.

=== Precipitation ===
A day that has at least 0.04 inches of liquid or liquid-equivalent precipitation is considered to be wet. The likelihood of a wet day in Arochukwu increases quickly throughout the summer, from 80% at the beginning of the season to 86% at the end.

For comparison, on September 16 there is a 90% possibility of a wet day, while on January there is a 4% chance.

== Languages ==
The languages spoken in Arochukwu LGA are,

- Igbo
- Ibuoro (Ibibio)
- Nkari (Ibibio)

== Etymology ==
Aro translates as Children and Chukwu as God. Put together this could imply Children of God.

== Notable people ==
- Mazi Alvan Ikoku, OBE educationist (1900–1971)
- Nwankwo Kanu, footballer
- Chidi Imoh, athlete
- Alexx Ekubo, actor and model
- Nnamdi Udoh, aeronautic engineer
- Margaret Manson Graham (1860–1933), Scottish missionary nurse who died at Arochukwu
- Mao Ohuabunwa, industrialist and politician
- Rosemary Inyama, educator, politician, businesswoman and community developer
