= Oke Nnachi =

Oke Nnachi was the son of Nnachi and possibly introduced the idea of bringing Akpa troops to help the Eze Agwu, Nnachi clan, and Obong Okon Ita rebels during the Aro-Ibibio Wars. After the short dynasty of Osim and Akuma Nnubi of Akuma, Oke Nnachi became king of Arochukwu. His descendants still retain the throne.
