= Obinkita =

- Village
- Location in Nigeria
- Coordinates: 5°23′N 7°55′E
- Country: Nigeria
- State: Abia State
- LGA: Arochukwu
- Time zone: UTC+1 (WAT)

Obinkita is one of 19 villages of Arochukwu Local Government Area of Abia State. It is in Abia North Senatorial District of the state. It is thought to have been the capital of the northern Ibibio kingdom of Ibom before its supposed conquest by Igbo and Akpa invaders in 1690–1720. However, evidence suggests that it is simply a small town inhabited by descendants of assimilated Akpa peoples and that the actual capital of the old northern Ibibio kingdom alluded to remains within the confines of Ibibio territory in Ini local government of Akwa Ibom state. Nevertheless, Obinkita remains significant in Aro History. Usually, all Aro villages assemble at Obinkita during the Ikeji festival. The Ikeji Festival is the New Yam Festival of the Aro people, celebrated annually in the month of September.
