= Mbiam =

Mbiam is an Ibibio traditional oath and injunction. Mbiam is believed to be in different forms; in powdered form, liquid or aye (palm front leave). Though they may have physical representation, the result is believed to be spiritually manifested. Mbiam can be used for different purposes, it can be used to detect innocence and guilt of an accused person, it can be used to keep people from breaking promises and it can also serve as an injunction. In the 21st-century "Mbiam" is still used by several people, of recent apart from being used by traditional rulers it is also said to be used by politicians to keep its supporters loyalty in check.
