= Okon (surname) =

Okon or Okón is a surname of the following notable people:

- Akakpokpo Okon, 18th century African king
- Akpan Okon, 17th century African king
- Aniekeme Okon (born 1999), Nigerian football forward
- Edwin Okon (born 1970), Nigerian football coach
- Effiong Okon (born 1985), Nigerian boxer
- Eugeniusz Okoń (1881–1949), Polish priest, activist, and politician
- Eyo Edet Okon (1914–2010), Nigerian Christian clergyman and minister
- Gianluca Okon (born 2009), Australian is a football player
- Ime Okon (born 2004), South African football player
- Israel Okon (born 2006), Nigerian sprinter
- John Ene Okon (1969–2016), Nigerian football player
- Kakpokpo Okon, 17th century African prince
- Paul Okon (born 1972), Australian football player, father of Gianluca and Paul Jr.
- Paul Okon-Engstler (born 2005), Australian football player, brother of Gianluca
- Udeme Okon (born 2005), South African sprinter
- Yoshua Okón (born 1970), Mexican artist
