= Anya Oko Anya =

Nigerian professor of Biology

Anya Oko Anya (born 3 January 1937) is a Nigerian professor of Biology who is distinguished for his work in parasitology.

== Early life ==
Anya Oko Anya was born on 3 January 1937 at Abiriba, Abia State of Nigeria. He attended Hope Waddell Training Institution, Calabar, University College, Ibadan, Saint John's College, Cambridge, England and Molteno Institute of Biology and Parasitology.

He began his working career as a Science Master with Qua-Iboe Mission Secondary School, Etinan, Akwa Ibom State in 1957. He was appointed Research Officer, Federal Fisheries Research Service, Lagos, 1961–1962; Lecturer, Federal Science School, Lagos, 1961–1962; Research Officer, Federal Department of Agricultural Research, Ibadan, 1963–1967; Lecturer in Zoology, University of Nigeria, Nsukka, 1965–1967; Senior Lecturer, University of Science and Technology Project, Port Harcourt, 1967–1970; Senior Lecturer, University of Nigeria, Nsukka, 1970–1973; Professor of Zoology, University of Nigeria, Nsukka since 1973, he was the first chief executive officer of Nigeria Economic Summit Group Ltd. He was the Chairman of the Governing Board of the Nigerian National Merit Award, former President of the Nigerian Academy of Science and former Pro-Chancellor and Chairman Governing Council of the Michael Okpara University of Agriculture, Umudike, Abia State.

== Awards ==
Anya was awarded the Nigerian National Order of Medal of Merit (NNOM) by the Nigerian government in 1992.

Anya has also been awarded the Officer of the Order of the Federal Republic (OFR) and made a Fellow of the Nigeria Academy of Science.
