= Agwu Inobia =

Founding father of Arochukwu, Abia state

Agwu Inobia or Eze Agwu was one of the founding fathers of the city of Arochukwu, the third largest city in Abia State in southeastern Nigeria. He was a blacksmith and leader of his clan. Eze Agwu is said to be the descendant of Nna Uru. Nna Uru was related to the founders of neighboring communities Abiriba and Edda people. Edda and Abiriba traditions state that their ancestors founded Arochukwu.

Eze Agwu's clan settled in an area now known as Amanagwu city-state. As new settlers, the Eze Agwu clan was resisted by the regional power Obong Okon Ita which led to the start of the Aro-Ibibio Wars. The war initially became a stalemate. Both sides arranged a marriage between the king of Obong Okon Ita and a woman from the Eze Agwu clan in an attempt for a peaceful coexistence. The marriage eventually failed to bring peace but eventually played a decisive role in the war.

King Agwu Inobia invited Priest Nnachi from the Edda group to help him break the stalemate and win the war. When he arrived, Nnachi and Eze Agwu allied with prince Akakpokpo Okon of the Ibibio kingdom of Obong Okon Ita. Akakpokpo Okon was the son of the marriage between the Igbo women of the King of Obong Okon Ita. The Eze Agwu/Nnachi faction decided to help Akakpokpo attempt to overthrow his brother king Akpan Okon and the coup was heavily resisted. Nnachi called on an Eastern Cross river group known as the Akpa for help. The Akpa are said to have possessed guns and are credited for introducing the weapon to the region. Princes Osim and Akuma Nnubi led Akpa soldiers to help fight against the Ibibios. The alliance between Eze Agwu, Nnachi, Akakpokpo Okon, and the Akpa strengthened their position against the Obong Okon Ita forces (1690–1720) under the leadership of Osim Nnubi. As a result of the Aro-Ibibio Wars, the alliance formed the Arochukwu kingdom. Akuma Nnubi was appointed king of Arochukwu in the place of his brother Osim Nnubi who died during the end of the war. Prince Akakpokpo died and the Ulu Okon dynasty was assimilated into the Eze Agwu lineage. The Amanagwu was incorporated as the first of the 19 city-states of Arochukwu and Eze Agwu became one of the three lineages of Arochukwu.
