= Akakpokpo Okon =

Ibibio prince

Akakpokpo Okon was an Ibibio prince from the Ibom Kingdom around 1690–1720. He was the son of the marriage between king Obong Okon Ita and an Igbo woman from the Eze Agwu lineage. Akakpokpo Okon lead a coup against his brother Akpan Okon the Obong (king) with the support of the Eze Agwu, Nnachi, and the Nnubi dynasty in the final phases of the Aro-Ibibio Wars. Akakpokpo Okon was killed in combat.
