= Obong Okon Ita =

Traditional king in pre-colonial Nigeria

Obong Okon Ita was an Ibibio king of Ibom Kingdom with its seat of government in Obot Okon Ita. His kingdom was located between present day Abia and Akwa Ibom states in Southeastern Nigeria. He is the father of Akakpokpo Okon and Akpan Okon who fought for supremacy for the rulership of Ibom Kingdom
