= Afaha Efiat =

- Village
- Interactive map of Afaha Efiat
- Coordinates: 4°49′46.31″N 7°50′1.18″E
- Country: Nigeria
- State: Akwa Ibom
- Local Government Area: Etinan

Afaha Efiat is a village in Etinan local government area of Akwa Ibom State, Nigeria.
