= Nnachi Ipia =

Co-founder of Arochukwu, Abia state

Nnachi Ipia mononymously known as Nnachi, was one of the founding fathers of the city of Arochukwu, one of the largest villages in Abia State in southeastern Nigeria. During the conclusion of the 17th century, he was a Dibia (priest-doctor) from the Edda people near Afikpo. The Eze Agwu clan led by his relative King Agwu Inobia in the Aro region called on Nnachi for help during the Aro-Ibibio Wars. Unable to break the stalemate in the favor of Eze Agwu, Nnachi called some allies from the east of the Cross River known as the Akpa people. Akuma and Osim Nnubi led the Akpa people into the Aro region and collaborated with Igbo forces (and Ibibio rebels) to battle against the troops of Obong Okon Ita kingdom. Though Osim died, Akuma survived and became the first EzeAro. After his death, Nnachi's descendants took over the throne starting with his son, Oke Nnachi. They are currently the ruling clan of the Aro people.

== See also ==
- Aro-Ibibio Wars
