= Okon (given name) =

Okon is a Nigerian masculine given name. It may refer to the following notable people:

- Okon Abang (born 1961), Nigerian lawyer
- Okon Flo Essien (born 1981), Nigerian football player
- Okon Ime Bassey, Nigerian politician and lawyer
- Okon Uya (1947–2014), Nigerian diplomat
