= Aro Confederacy =

Former trade confederation in present southeastern Nigeria

Aro Confederacy Omu Aro
- 1640–1902
- Capital: Arochukwu
- Common languages: Igbo; Ibibio; Ekoi; Efik; and others
- Government: Confederalism
- Historical era: Early modern
  - Established: 1640
  - Disestablished: 1902
- Currency: Manillas; Cowry shells; Slaves
Preceded by	Succeeded by
Aro people	Colonial Nigeria
- Today part of: Nigeria, Cameroon, and Gabon

The Aro Confederacy (1640–1902) was a political union orchestrated by the Aro people, an Igbo subgroup, centered in Arochukwu in present-day southeastern Nigeria. The Aro Confederacy was founded after the end of the Aro-Ibibio Wars. Their influence and presence was across much of Eastern Nigeria and parts of neighboring hinterlands of the Benue valleys, forming a multi‑ethnic economic zone during the 18th and 19th centuries. The Arochukwu communities were an economic, political, and an oracular center as they were home to the Ibini Ukpabi oracle, High Priests, the Aro King Eze Aro, and central council (Okpankpo). The Aro Confederacy was a powerful and influential political and economic alliance of various Igbo-speaking communities in southeastern Nigeria. It emerged during the 17th century and played a significant role in the region until the late 19th century.

== Rise and strength ==
Edda, Abam, Afikpo, Ohafia, Aro states

The exact origins of the Aro Confederacy are not precisely documented, but it is believed to have been established around the mid-17th century. The Aro people, who were part of the Igbo ethnic group, inhabited the region around present-day Arochukwu in Abia State, Nigeria. They were skilled traders and missionaries who played a pivotal role in connecting various Igbo communities. This migration and their military power, and wars with neighboring kingdoms, supported by their alliances with several related neighboring Igbo and eastern Cross River militarized states and mercenaries (particularly Ohafia, Edda, Abam, Abiriba, Afikpo, Ekoi, Bahumono, Amasiri, Uzuakoli and Ezza as mercenary etc.), quickly established the Aro Confederacy as a regional economic power.

The Aro Confederacy's strength came from its well-organized network of Aro agents who were dispersed across different communities in the region. These agents acted as intermediaries in trade, diplomacy, and religious matters. They facilitated commerce, resolved disputes, and spread the worship of the Aro deity known as the "Long Juju" oracle.

Igbo made swords acquired by Jean Barbot 1699

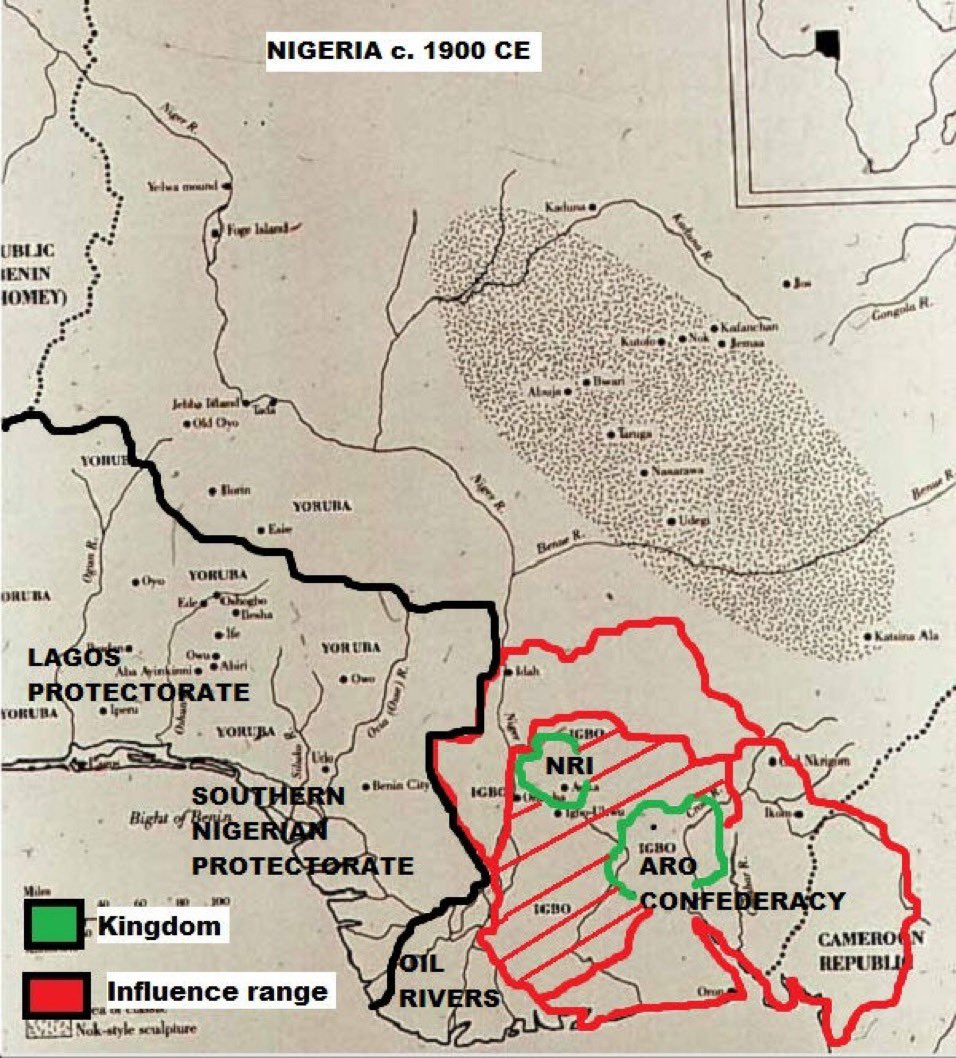

== The "Long Juju" oracle ==
The "Long Juju" oracle was the spiritual centerpiece of the Aro Confederacy. It was housed in Arochukwu and considered a potent source of political authority and religious guidance. The Aro people used the oracle to enforce their influence and control over surrounding communities. It also served as a means to administer justice and settle disputes, often attracting pilgrims seeking solutions to their problems.

Many peoples including Ijaw, Ibibio, Efik made pilgrimages to Arochukwu to inquire with the oracle, which had become more appealed to than the once paramount Kingdom of Benin.

In visiting Arochukwu, British explorer Baikie notes of the city:

Not far from this stands the noted city of A'ro or A'no, where is the celebrated shrine of Chukwu, or the deity to which pilgrimages are made, not only from all parts of I'gbo proper, but from Old Kalabar, from the tribes along the coast, and from Orii, and Nimbe or Brass. The city is described as being nearly three times the size of Aboh, and as extremely populous. The inhabitants are skilful artisans, and manufacture swords, spears, and metallic ornaments, specimens of all of which I have seen, and can therefore testify to their being very neatly finished. The town is always mentioned with great respect, almost, at times, with a degree of veneration, and the people say " Chukwu ab yama “ or God lives there.

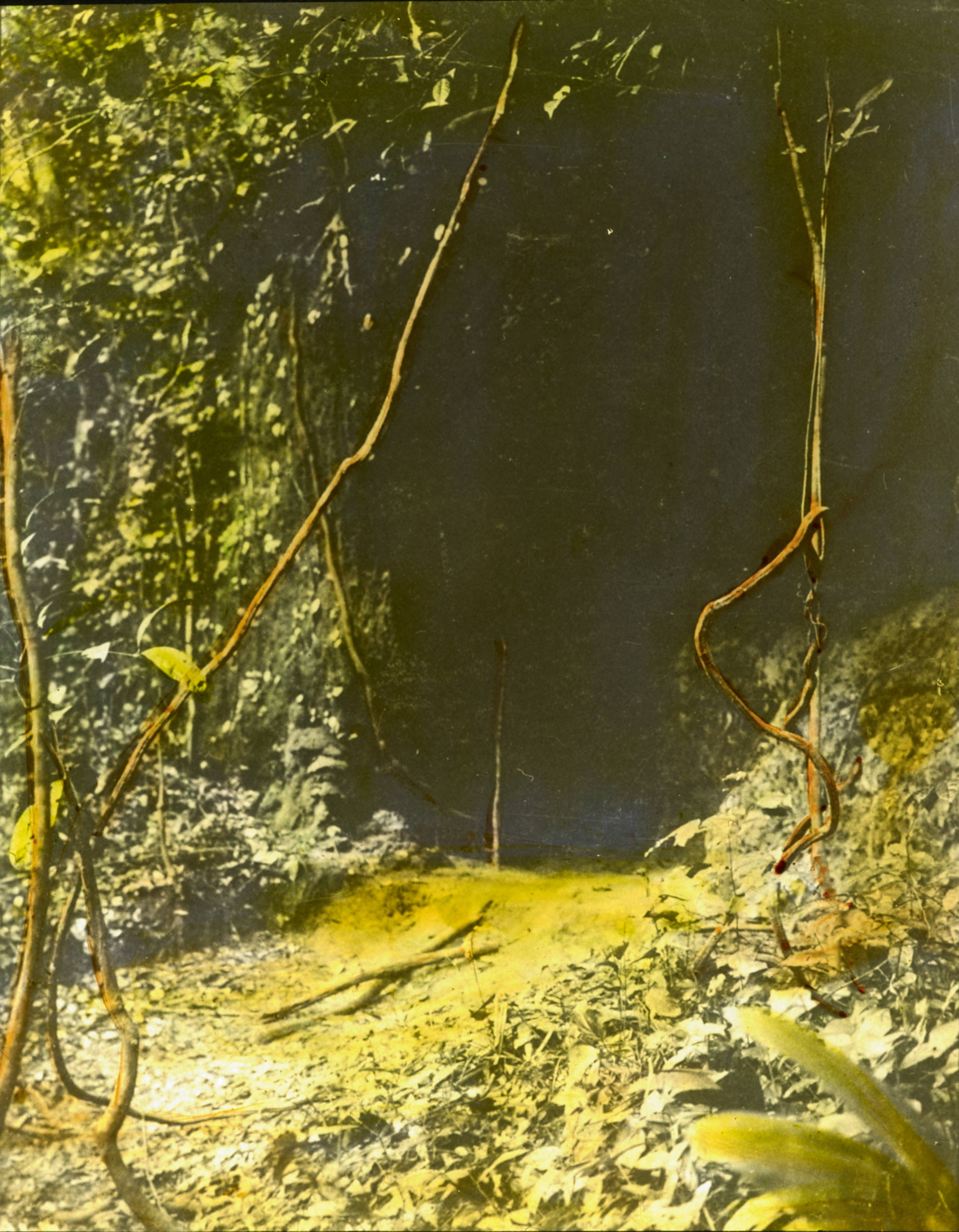
Remains of Long JuJu of Arochukwu, late 19th century

== Economic power ==
The Aro Confederacy gained significant economic power through trade relations with the Oguta-Ameshi, Onitsha, and Kalabari monarchies. Their economy was primarily based on sale of slaves and Palm oil. During the Trans-Atlantic slave trade, the Aro were the primary provider of slaves to the wealthy riverine Igbo merchants of Oguta-Ameshi, Onitsha, and Kalabari. The prominent international slave markets in Igboland were the Oguta Lake Slave Market, Onitsha, Abonnema, and Bonny. These markets were centres of international trade, diplomacy, and major gateways through which Western civilization entered Igboland.

== Confederacy ==
Aro confederacy was an alliance with several related neighboring Igbo and eastern Cross River militarized states particularly Ohafia, Edda, Abam, Abiriba, Afikpo, Ekoi, Bahumono, Amasiri, Uzuakoli, etc. The confederacy's activities on the coast helped the growth of city-states in the Niger Delta, and these city states became important centres for the export of palm oil and slaves. Such city-states included Opobo, Bonny, Nembe, Calabar, as well as other slave trading city-states controlled by the Ijaw and Efik. The Aros formed a strong trading network, colonies, and incorporated hundreds of communities that formed into powerful kingdoms. The Ajalli, Arondizuogu, Ndikelionwu, and Kingdoms were some of the most powerful Aro states in the Confederacy after Arochukwu. Some were founded and named after commanders and chiefs like Izuogu Mgbokpo and Iheme who led Aro/Abam forces to conquer Ikpa Ora and founded Arondizuogu. Later Aro commanders such as Okoro Idozuka (also of Arondizuogu) expanded the state's borders through warfare at the start of the 19th century. Aro migrations also played a large role in the expansion of Ozizza, Afikpo, Amasiri, Izombe, and many other city-states. For example, Aro soldiers founded at least three villages in Ozizza. The Aro Confederacy's power, however, derived mostly from its economic and religious position. With European colonists on their way at the end of the 19th century, things changed.

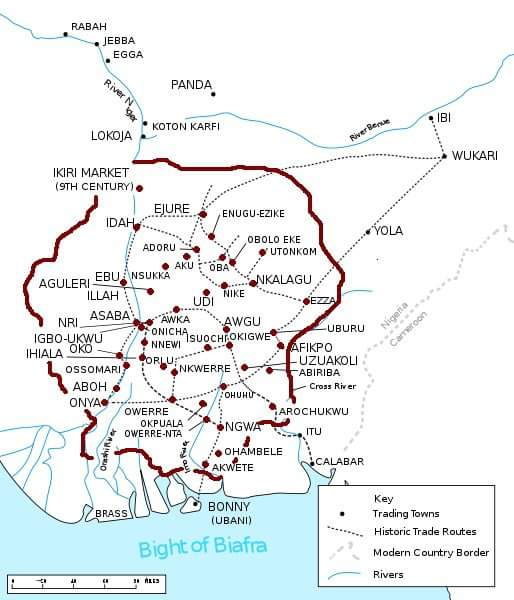
Pre-Colonial Igbo trading routes

== Decline ==
During the 1890s, the Royal Niger Company of Britain bore friction with the Aros because of their economic dominance. The Aro resisted British penetration in the hinterland because their economic and religious influence was being threatened. The Aro and their allies launched offensives against British allies in Igboland and Ibibioland. After failed negotiations, the British attempted to conquer the Aro Confederacy in 1899. By 1901, the tensions were especially intensified when British prepared for the Aro Expedition. The invasion of Obegu (in Igboland) was the last major Aro offensive before the start of the Anglo-Aro War. In November 1901, the British launched the Aro Expedition and after strong Aro resistance, Arochukwu was captured on December 28, 1901. By early 1902, the war was over and the Aro Confederacy collapsed. Contrary to the belief that the Ibini Ukpabi was destroyed, the shrine still exists, and is intact in Arochukwu and serves mainly as a tourist site.

Burning of Arochukwu, 1901

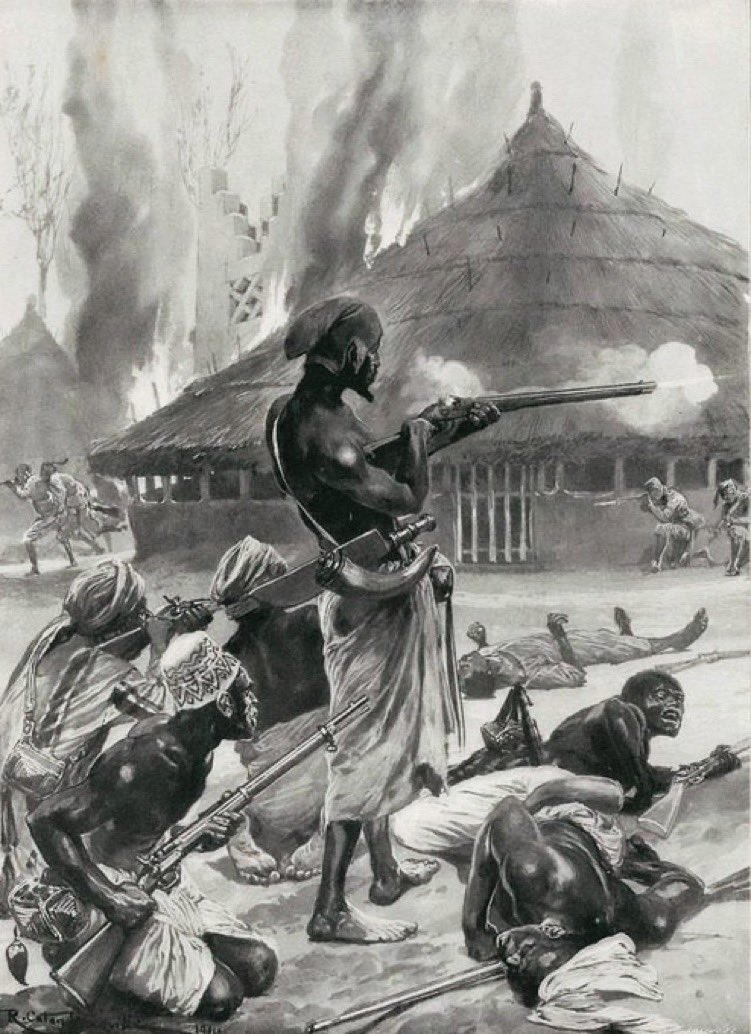
"The Opening Up of Nigeria, the Expedition Against the Aros by Richard Caton Woodville II" 1901
