= Ibibio Americans =

Ibibio Americans (Ibibio: Mbon Ibibio k'Àmérìkà) are Americans of Ibibio descent. Ibibio people are a West African ethnic group found predominantly in Southern Nigeria. They are mainly found in the Nigerian states of Akwa Ibom, Cross River, and the Eastern part of Abia.

During the 1960s and 1970s, after the Nigerian-Biafran War, Nigeria's government funded scholarships for Nigerian students, and many of them were admitted to American universities. While this was happening, there were several military coups and brief periods of civilian rule. All this caused many Nigerians to emigrate. Most of these Nigerian immigrants are of Yoruba, Igbo and Ibibio origins.
