= Urum Kalu Eke =

Nigerian Banker (born 1964)

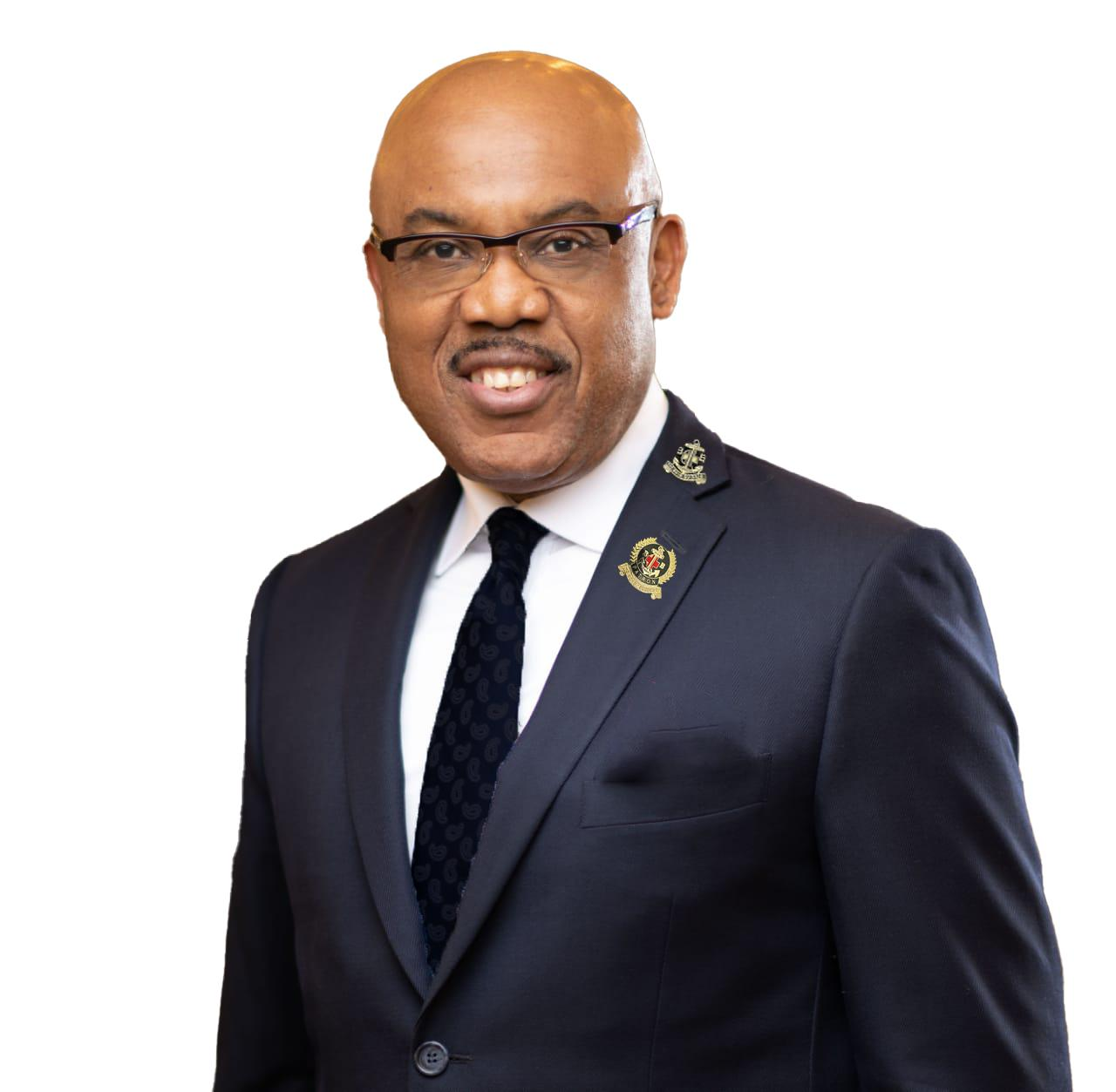
- Picture of Elder Urum Kalu Eke dressed in the Boys Brigade Patron Uniform

Group Managing Director, FBN Holdings Plc.
- In office January 2016 – December 2021
- Preceded by: Mr. Bello Maccido
- Succeeded by: Mr. Nnamdi Okonkwo

Executive Director, South, First Bank of Nigeria Limited
- In office May 2011 – December 2015

Personal details
- Born: Urum Kalu Eke; 20 November 1964 (age 61) Lagos, Lagos State, Nigeria
- Spouse: Dr (Mrs) Uganze Eke
- Children: 4
- Education: University of Lagos; Federal University of Technology, Owerri
- Profession: Banker

Elder Urum Kalu "UK" Eke, Mfr (born 20 November 1964) is a Nigerian businessman and banker who served as the Group Managing Director of FBN Holdings Plc until his retirement in December 2021. Prior to this appointment he was an executive director with First Bank of Nigeria Limited. Before this, he had worked with Diamond Bank Plc. where he rose to become an executive director. He began his career in 1986 with Deloitte Haskins & Sells International, a firm of chartered accountants. A recipient of the Nigerian National Order of Merit (NNOM), Member of the Order of the Federal Republic (Mfr), UK, as he is more commonly known, is also a Fellow of the Institute of Chartered Accountants of Nigeria. He is currently the Executive Chairman of Fairchild Group. He is the President of the Lagos State Council (https://boysbrigadelagos.com/) of the Boys' Brigade (Boys' Brigade) in Nigeria.

== Early life ==
UK was born in Lagos, Nigeria. His father was a Scotland-trained nurse, who had to flee Lagos with his young family just before the outbreak of the Nigerian Civil War in 1967. Along with his mother, a housewife, and six other siblings, UK traversed Eastern Nigeria in the Civil War years, accompanying a father whose profession was much sought after during the war. The third of his parents’ children, and first male child, UK attended Comprehensive Secondary School, Aba and Government College, Umuahia for his West African School Certificate (WASC) and Higher School Certificate (HSC) respectively. Thereafter he obtained a bachelor's degree in political science from the University of Lagos in 1985, before completing an MBA in projects management technology from Federal University of Technology, Owerri in 2008.

== Career ==
=== Deloitte Haskins and Sells International ===
From 1985, UK spent his 1-year mandatory post-graduation service in the employment of Deloitte Haskins and Sells International. He worked for another 5 years with the company rising up to the post of audit senior/consultant.

=== Diamond bank ===
UK spent nineteen years with Diamond Bank. His increasingly senior roles in the bank included branch manager, regional manager, divisional head and executive director. He left Diamond Bank in April 2011.

=== First bank ===
UK joined FirstBank as executive director, Public Sector (South), in May 2011 – he was responsible in this function for all state and federal government relationships, in addition to tertiary and health institutions in the south of Nigeria. UK was also appointed FirstBank's Chief Knowledge Officer in 2013.

On December 31, 2021, UK retired as group managing director, FBN Holdings Plc. He had assumed this office on Monday 4 January 2016, replacing Mr. Bello Maccido, the pioneer Group CEO of FBN Holdings.

== Personal life ==
UK is married to Dr. Uganze Eke, a pharmacist. The couple have four daughters. A Paul Harris Fellow of Rotary International, UK, who currently chairs the Fairchild Group (a non-operating holding company) founded the Elder (Chief) K.U. Eke Memorial Foundation, through which he supports education scholarship, women empowerment, training of clergy men/pastors, mentoring and capacity building.

Elder Urum Kalu Eke is actively involved in community service. He currently serves as the President of the Lagos State Council (https://boysbrigadelagos.com/) of the Boys' Brigade in Nigeria. Having previously served as the council's patron and with a distinguished career in the corporate world, Eke brings extensive experience and leadership to this role. His election on August 10, 2024, was met with strong support. Following his election to serve for the next 3 years, under the "Building a Brighter Future" Team Progress Theme, the State Council and the Nation look forward to his focus on empowering young men through innovation and collaboration. This vision includes continuous improvement, digital transformation, strengthening the Boys' Brigade brand, investing in infrastructure and expansion, and building strategic partnerships.

UK, Fellow of the Institute of Management Consultants, and Fellow of the Institute of Directors, also sits on the board of the Nigeria Sovereign Investment Authority (NSIA), a position to which he was appointed on 16 February 2017.
