= Ibom Isi =

The Ibom Isi also known as the Akpa are one of the three main lineages comprising the Aro people. They are centered in Ibom, Arochukwu in Nigeria. The Akpa are descendants of the Ejagham in present day Cross River State in Southeastern Nigeria.

During the Aro-Ibibio Wars in present-day Arochukwu in the 1600s, an Igbo leader named Okennachi (the first Igbo EzeAro), invited his allies the princes Osim and Akuma Nnubi from the east of the Cross River to fight against a clan of the Ibibios and granting them lands. The Nnubis, led their people known as the Akpa to present-day Arochukwu. They led the Akpa forces to ally with Igbo forces. Osim Nnubi died in the battle, the war between Aros and the northern clan of the Ibibios ended in a stalemate. Akuma became the first EzeAro or king. The Akpa people were assimilated and are mainly in Ibom, and other towns belonging to the Ibom Isi kindred.
