= Edda people =

Ethnic subgroup in Nigeria

The people of Eddaland, known as the Eddics, are a sub-group of the Igbo people in south-eastern Nigeria. The land and people of Eddaland have been constitutionally designated the present day Afikpo South Local Government Area of Ebonyi State, Nigeria.

== Sources ==
- Egbebu progressive union
- Edda women wing Enugu
- Dike Azuka A. (28 October 2009). "Ethnology: Ohaffia: A Matrilineal Ibo People. Philip O. Nsugbe". American Anthropologist. 78 (1): 172–173. doi:10.1525/aa.1976.78.1.02a00920. ISSN 1548-1433.
