= Ibini Ukpabi =

Tentative World Heritage Site in Nigeria

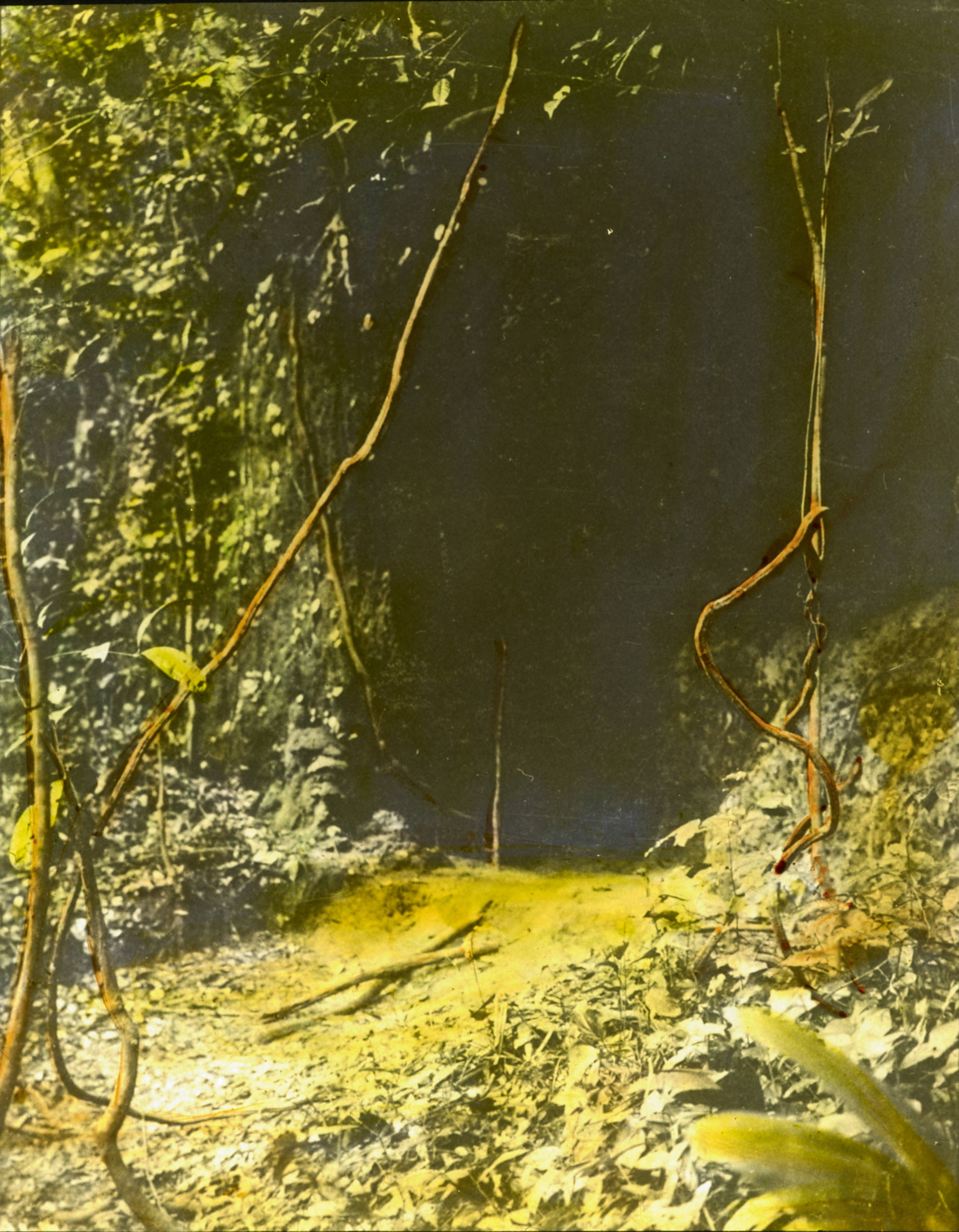
"Remains of Long Juju Gorge, Arochukwu, late 19th century"

The Ibini Ukpabi (Ibibio: Drum of the Creator God) was an oracle of the Aro Confederacy of what is now Southeastern Nigeria. It was known among the British as the 'Long Ju-ju'. Ibini Ukpabi was used to settle cases, particularly those of murder, witchcraft, poisoning and family disputes. The oracle was paramount throughout the Niger Delta; the losing party of a case was traditionally destroyed by the oracle, but the priests of Ibini Ukpabi developed a preference in selling the losing party into slavery instead. As the system continued, it was alleged that the priests of Ibini Ukpabi falsified some of the verdicts of the oracle in order to procure victims to be sold into slavery. Hundreds of people visited Ibini Ukpabi and many did not return; their communities usually believed that the oracle had devoured anybody that visited it.

== Shrine ==
The area around the shrine of Ibini Ukpabi and the cult monument of Kamalu includes a sacred altar, a six-foot gully that takes people to the temple and a waterfall; this has been called the Long Juju Slave Route of Arochukwu. There is also the throne of judgement - the dark presence ("the Holy of Holies"). Those found guilty walked into dark tunnels and those found innocent went back to their relatives. Other features include a hill of rags. That is the place where the condemned were instructed to undress and leave their clothes before they disappeared into the tunnels around the hill of rags. There is also the tunnel of disappearance, which is the dark tunnels into which the victims disappeared. At the site can be found the red river where it is said that as the victims disappear, the Aro would colour the river red to give people the impression that the condemned has died. And the red water flowing down the stream would be a sign to the relatives that the victims were dead. Yet another feature, is the Iyi-Eke - an outlet from where the victims blind folded walk to "Onu Asu Bekee" (the European beach, which later became the government beach) and from there, waiting boats took the enslaved to Calabar for onward transmission to Ala Bekee.

== Colonial period ==
As the British Empire began expanding towards the kingdoms around the River Niger, the shrine brought these communities together as it became something of an apex court for people living east of the Niger. Due to the great influence of the Long Juju, shrine stewards and lower members of the Juju cult migrated to clans south of the Niger and settled.

The Long Juju stronghold was destroyed during the Anglo-Aro War by a British expeditionary force as part of their quest for vengeance for the brutal murder of several British officials, which led to their decision to declare war on the Long Juju and the network it had established in the region. The mystic Long-Juju shrine, the slave routes and other relics of the slave trade era have become important tourist attractions in Abia State, Nigeria as a result of what they represent in Nigeria’s history.

== See also ==
- Odinani
- Igbo people
