= Nnubi dynasty =

17th century tribal dynastic period in West Africa

Osim and Akuma Nnubi were brothers and merchant princes of the Akpa people from the east of the Cross River in the late 17th century. The Akpa people were trading allies with the Eze Agwu and Nnachi clans of the Igbo. When Nnachi called them to assist the Igbos in the Aro-Ibibio Wars, they answered. Leading their people, they allied with the Igbo groups to fight against the northern Ibibio clan. Osim died and his brother Akuma became the new Arochukwu kingdom's first EzeAro or king.
