= Abiriba =

Abiriba Enuda city (Ancient Enuda kingdom ♚♔)
- town
- Nickname: The Small London
- Location in Nigeria
- Coordinates: 5°42′N 7°44′E
- Country: Nigeria
- State: Abia State
- LGA: Ohafia

Population (1975)
  - Total: 37,350
  - Density: 6.66/sq mi (2.572/km^{2})
- Time zone: UTC+1 (WAT)

Abiriba is a traditional Enuda kingdom in Abia State, in southeastern Nigeria, traditionally an Igbo speaking region. It is in the Ohafia local government area.

== History ==
Founded during the 14th century, the origin of the Abiriba people is not as speculative as the origin of other Igbos of southeastern Nigeria. Historical evidence supports the fact that Abiriba people migrated from the cross river basin and share historical ancestry with the people of Arochukwu. constant disputes between the seven families under Ukpaghiri prompted the clan to move to Ena and finally to Akpa. However, the Abiriba people found it difficult to settle in Akpa due to several issues with neighbours. Nevertheless, the death of Ukpaghiri led to the movement of Abiriba and his group to Usukpam. Despite staying there for many years, they were still never at peace with the neighbours. The land occupied by the Abiriba people was originally small, but they conquered some Nkporo lands at Oriakwa. Abiriba was renowned and known for blacksmithing and iron smelting throughout Igboland.

Abiriba is made up of three main villages: Ameke, Amogudu, and Agboji. It operates a monarchical system. It operates on a tripodal system where the Eze of each of the three communities come together to form the Enachioken-in-council with the Eze Ameke as Enachioken on the basis of first among equals. The Paramount Ruler of Abiriba kingdom and the Enachoken of Abiriba, Kalu Kalu Ogbu.

=== Succession to the throne of Enachioken ===
Due to the tradition of the Nde Abiriba, the rule is that the descendants of the founder of Abiriba would rule over the kingdom. This is due to the fact that the succession to the throne of the Enachioken is by hereditary which is made up of the three royal compounds, that is, the ruling houses in the Abiriba Kingdom.

== Culture ==
=== Okpu Achi tree and its myth ===
At the heart of Abiriba —the very centre of the town—is a large, ancient tree "Okpu Achi" (Achi tree). The tree is both symbolic and spiritual and many believe that in the event of its fall, water from Okpu Achi would engulf the entire Abiriba land. Legend also has it that the Ishimokoto River is so mystical that when foreigners tried to leave town with a bottle of water from the river—the bottle broke apart and the water flew miles back to the river.

== Ceremony ==
Itu Eye, a festival of over 600 years old, is a traditional law enactment period in Abiriba kingdom. The ceremony marks the enactment of new laws in the ancient kingdom by the paramount ruler, Enachoken of Abiriba, after which the laws are handed over to an age grade group for enforcement. The ceremony starts with the picking of the palm leaf, Iburu omu, by the Okezie age grade group.

=== Age grade ===
Age grade, also known as UKE in Abiriba language, was structured to ensure a peaceful coexistence in their abode. The age grade with its unique features was introduced in the community such that in the contemporary time, the traditional institution had become the backbone behind probably all the developments in Abiriba. Thus governance and development of the people have gone on orderly for centuries through this indigenous system (age-grade) of the people.

== Notable people ==
Notable people from Abiriba include:

- Anya Oko Anya, biologist and academic
- Urum Kalu Eke, former GMD, First Bank Holdings
- Uche Jombo, Nollywood actress
- Ebitu Ukiwe, Vice President and former Governor of Lagos State
