= Mbot Abasi Kingdom =

Ibibio kingdom

The Ibom or Mbot Abasi Kingdom was a kingdom by the Ibibio people with its seat of government in Obot Okon Ita. The Mbot Abasi kingdom was located at the boundary between Akwa Ibom and, Abia State in Nigeria. Around 1630, a group of Igbo from Abiriba known as the Eze Agwu arrived in Ibom. This caused long term conflict and a stalemate known as the Aro-Ibibio Wars.

== Origin ==
Before Igbo arrival in the Aro territory, a group of proto Ibibio migrated to the area and established the Ibom Kingdom during the Bantu expansion. This proto Ibibio group originally came from Usak Edet (Isanguele), a segment of the Ejagham in present-day Southern Cameroon. Ibom is an old word used by the Efik / Ibibio / Annang /Eket people of Nigeria meaning the ancient universe, the cradle earth, or the cradle, original or ancient community from which others sprang forth. The word Ibom symbolizes the ancestral, the origin, the cradle, the source and the ancient community or place or area from which other communities or people sprang forth or originated. The Efik were originally from the Ibom Kingdom and might have left before or during the Aro-Ibibio Wars. Akwa Ibom State is one of the present two states created from the old Akwa Akpa kingdom, Cross River State being the sister state. The people of the Ibom Kingdom also called themselves Mbot Abasi (the people of God). Abasi is the supreme creator god of the Efik, Ibibio, and Annang people.

== Akwa ==
Akwa also spelled Aqua, meaning The Great One or The Essential One is believed to be the ancestor of the people of Ibibio and Efik. Kwa or Qua therefore means Essential One or Great One. It is of no coincidence that their ancient Kingdom was originally known as Akwa Akpa. The words Akwa, Aqua, Kwa, Qua are common names for places, rivers, in both Akwa Ibom State and in Cross River State.

Today, one of the towns in Arochukwu, Abia state is called Ibom. Ibom is also where the famous Ibini Ukpabi oracle is located.
