= Isanguele =

Village in Southwest Province, Cameroon

- arrondissement
- Location within Cameroon Location within Africa
- Coordinates: 4.7804°N 8.6800°E
- Country: Cameroon
- Province: Southwest Province
- Department: Ndian

Isanguele (Archibong) is a commune and arrondissement in the Ndian département, Southwest Province, western Cameroon. Located on the Akpa Yafe River, it is a small fishing community.

== See also ==
- Communes of Cameroon
