= Ibibio people =

Ethnic group in southern Nigeria

Mbon Ibibio
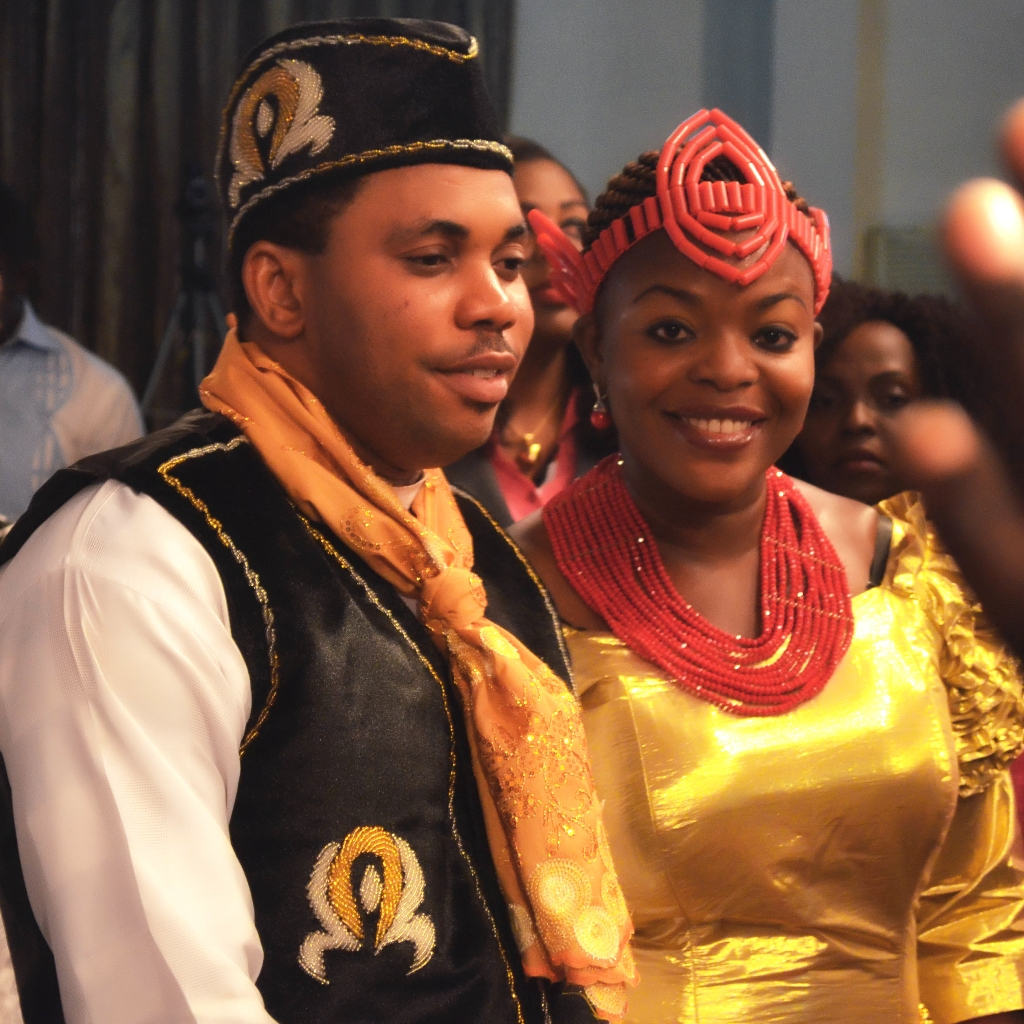
- An Ibibio couple

Total population
- 8,500,000

Regions with significant populations
- Nigeria: 8,000,000
- Ghana: 100,000
- Cameroon: 120,000
- Equatorial Guinea: 19,600

Languages
- Ibibio, English

Religion
- Christianity 90% Traditional Ibibio Religion 10%

Related ethnic groups
- Annang, Efik, Ekoi, Igbo, Obolo, Bahumono, Oron

- Person: Ówó Ibibio
- People: Mbon Ibibio
- Language: Usem Ibibio
- Country: Ibibioland

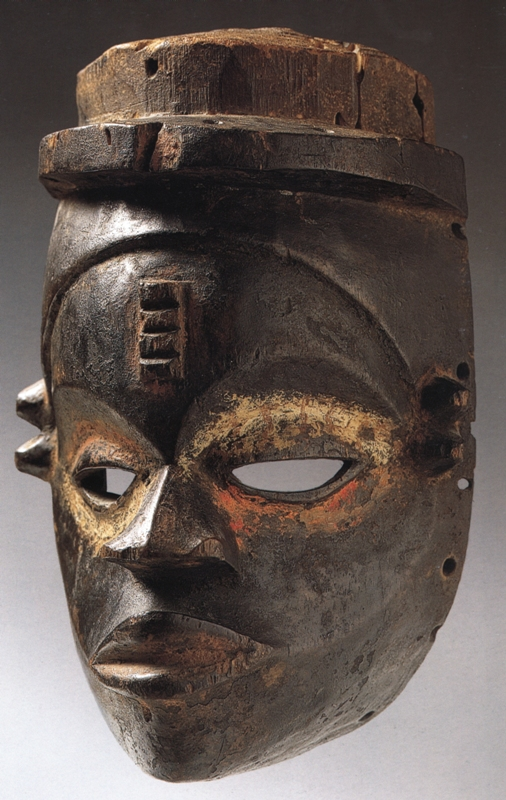
Ibibio mask from the Passaré collection, Milan

The Ibibio people (/ɪbɪˈbi.oʊ/ ih-bih-BEE-oh), also known as the Ibom, are a coastal people in southern Nigeria. They are mostly found in Akwa Ibom, Cross River, and the eastern part of Abia State. During the colonial period in Nigeria, the Ibibio Union asked for recognition by the British as a sovereign nation.

== Ibibio given names ==
- "Iniobong" is a Nigerian unisex given name of Cross River and Akwa Ibom origin meaning "God's time".
- "Emem" is a Nigerian unisex given name of Cross River and Akwa Ibom origin which means "peace", though it is now used predominantly for females.

The Annang, Ekid, Oron and Ibeno share personal names, culture, and traditions with the Ibibio, and speak closely related varieties (dialects) that are more or less mutually intelligible. The Ekpo and societies are a significant part of the Ibibio political system. They use a variety of masks to execute social control. Body art plays a major role in Ibibio art.

== Origin and history ==
The predominant paternal haplogroup among the Ibibio is E1b1a1-M2. The ancestors of the Ibibio originally came from Northeast Africa and moved around the Green Sahara. The gradual movement of the proto-Ibibio to the Cross River Region may have been associated with the expansion of Sahel agriculture in the African Neolithic period, following the desiccation of the Sahara in c. 3500 BCE.

The Ibibio people are reputed to be one of the earliest ethnic groups inhabiting southern Nigeria. It is estimated that they arrived at their present home around 1000 B.C. In spite of the historical account, it is not clear when the Ibibio arrived at the state.

According to some scholars, they might have come from the central Benue Valley, particularly, the Jukun influence in the old Calabar at some historical time period. Another pointer is the widespread use of the manila, a popular currency used by the Jukuns. Coupled with this, is the Jukun southern drive to the coast which appears to have been recently compared with the formation of Akwa Ibom settlements in their present location.

The most accepted version of Ibibio history described that the Cameroon will offer a more concise explanation of their origin. This was corroborated by oral testimonies by field workers who say that the core Ibibio people were of the Afaha lineage whose original home was Usak Edet in the Cameroons. The Uşak Edet (Isanguele) are a subgroup of the Ekoi people (the Ejagham). This was premised on the fact that among the Ibibio people, Usak Edet is popularly known as Edit Afaha (Afaha's Creek) which reflects the fact that Ibibio people originated from Usak Edet.

After the first bulk of the people arrived in what later became Nigeria, they settled first in Uruan. Sections of the Ibibio people then migrated westwards, eastwards, southwards and northwards. The northern clans of the Ibibio people settled at Ibom. It is believed that this clan of the Ibibio were the aboriginal people of Ibom settlement. The settlement, located in present day Arochukwu, is said to have been founded by their forefather, Ibom, after whom they named the village. They settled there for a very long time and worshiped the god of the sky called Abasi Ibom enyon. They also worshiped Ibini Ukpabi (Ibritam). As a result of clashes with the Igbo people who were moving southward, culminating in the Ibibio War which took place about 1630 and 1720 A.D., they left Ibom Kingdom and moved to the present day Ibibioland. Some village settlements had already been established in their current location alongside the Ibom.

Following the Aro-Igbo-Ibibio war of 1550 A.D, the Ibibios moved southward and found a virgin and empty land, their present place. The Ibibio first settled in Ikono from where they migrated or dispersed to further places becoming the aboriginal people of the present Ibibio lands. It is at this juncture that Ikono Ibom moved to Ikot Oku Ikono village now in the Uyo Local Government Area, which is referred to as Ikono Ibom Uyo, a clan carved out of the main Ikono Ibom. Iman Ibom moved to Ekom Iman, now in Etinan Local Government Area and Nsit Ibom moved to Afia Nsit now in Nsit Ibom. The three regard themselves as blood brothers and children of Ibom.

The three children of Ibom upon their final settlement, Etefia who is the principal actor in Ikono Ibom Uyo clan, settled in Ikot Oku Ikono and founded the Ikono Anyaan and Ikot Ekpeyak Ikono are stock and children of Ikono Ibom, they have shared and similar social, traditional and cultural Milieu.

Ekom Iman is a place which Iman Ibom settled and planted the Ekom tree (coula edulis) from which the name of the settlement is derived, Ekom (coula edulis) planted by Iman one of the sons of Ibom. Iman had children and some of them migrated to expand the Iman Ibom clan such villages like Ikot Obioinyang, Afagha Effiate and the entire Iman Ibom clan.

Upon the death of Iman Ibom, his spirit metamorphoses into the Iman Ibom clan deity "The Itina Iman deity" and oyot is the clan deity – totem hence it is a taboo to kill or eat such mythical beast and Ebre is the totem of Ikono Ibom clan, they forbid the killing or maiming of this mythical animal. Nsit Ibom moved to Afia Nsit where there was water and settled there, and his children spread to Mbak Nsit and other places of that clan.

The Nsit Ibom totem is Iyak Anyan – the Anyan Nsit deity. They all have shared a similar characteristics of social, traditional as well as cultural Milieu and formed the center of this study. The brothers settled close to each other and formed pact and ally or an affinity with each other and had children and devised a thoroughgoing mechanism for self-rule, maintenance of law and order, and effective political organization: Using some elements of culture and socio-religious organizations such as Ekpo, Ebre, Ibaan Isong, Ekong, Ikpa—udoh and many others to enforce law and order and to put the masses of the population under control.

== Ibibio groups ==
Ibibio group or Ibom group include following Ibibio or Ibom people

- Enyong: Northern Ibibio or Northern Ibom
- Eket: Southern Ibibio or Southern Ibom
- Annang or Oku Ibom: Western Ibibio or Western Ibom
- Ibiono: Eastern Ibibio or Eastern Ibom
- Uruan: Riverside Ibibio or Riverside Ibom

== Geography ==
The Ibibio people are found predominantly in Akwa Ibom State and are related to the Annang community, the Ibibio community and the Eket, although other groups usually understand the Ibibio language.

Because of the larger population of the Ibibio people, they hold political control over Akwa Ibom State, but the government is shared with the Annangs, Eket and Oron. The political system follows the traditional method of consensus. Even though elections are held, practically, the political leaders are pre-discussed in a manner that is benefiting to all.

=== Location of Ibibioland ===
The Ibibio people live primarily in the eastern part of South-South Nigeria. Prior to the existence of Nigeria as a nation, the Ibibio people were self-governed.

Ibibio people and their brothers (the Annang, Oron and Eket) were part of the enclave called Bight of Biafra before the British creation of Eastern Nigeria. The Ibibio people became a part of the Eastern Nigeria of Nigeria under British colonial rule.

During the Nigerian Civil War, the Eastern region was split into three states. The then-Southeastern State of Nigeria was where the Ibibio were located, it was created from the original twelve states of Nigeria after Nigerian independence.

The "Southeastern State" was later renamed Cross River State. On 23 September 1987, by Military Decree No.24, Akwa Ibom State was carved out of the then Cross Rivers State as a separate state. Cross Rivers State remains as a neighboring and mothering state of Akwa Ibom State.

Southwestern Cameroon was a part of the present Cross River State and Akwa Ibom State of Nigeria. During the then Eastern Region of Nigeria, parts were partitioned united with Cameroon in a 1961 plebiscite. This resulted in the Ibibio and Annang being divided between Nigeria and Cameroon.

However, the leadership of the Northern Region of Nigeria was able to keep the "Northwestern section" during the plebiscite that is now today's Nigerian Adamawa and Taraba States.

== Demographics ==
Ibibio people live in all states of Nigeria, and are also represented in expatriate Nigerian communities living outside of Nigeria (high in number next to the Yoruba and Igbo peoples). Hence, there is a significant number of Ibibio people in Europe and North America as well as other countries. In addition to their state of origin, Akwa Ibom State, significant number of Ibibio are found in:

- Abuja, Federal Capital Territory, Nigeria
- Lagos State, Nigeria
- Rivers State, Nigeria
- Abia State, Nigeria
- Bayelsa state, Nigeria
- Benue state, Nigeria
- Bioko, Equatorial Guinea
- Western Cameroon
- Ghana
- Brazil
- Cuba
- Jamaica
- Trinidad
- Bahamas
- United Kingdom
- Canada
- United States of America

== Political system ==
Traditionally Ibibio society consists of communities that are made up of large families with blood affinity each ruled by their constitutional and religious head, known as the Ikpaisong. The Obong Ikpaisong ruled with the Mbong Ekpuk ('head of the families'), which together with the heads of the cults and societies constitute the Afe, Asan, or Esop Ikpaisong ('traditional council, shrine, or court'). The decisions of the Obong Ikpaisong were enforced by members of the Ekpo or Obon society who act as messengers of the spirits and the military and police of the community. The chief will send masked individuals to confront a rule-breaker if the need arises.

Ekpo members Ekpo Masquerades are always masked when performing their policing duties. Although their identities are almost always known, fear of retribution from the ancestors prevents most people from accusing those members who overstep their social boundaries, effectively committing police brutality. Membership is open to all Ibibio males, but one must have access to wealth to move into the politically influential grades. The main purpose of Ekpo is to protect its people and act as a defense against potential attackers. They are concerned with issues and emergencies that pertain to the safety of the town as a whole. In addition, it serves as an outlet for men to productively use energy to benefit everyone.

In the months of June through December, the Ekpo society plays a large role in the community's life. Many activities such as farming, shopping, and obtaining food and water are prohibited on days in which the masks are out and being performed. Crimes also carry heavier consequences during this period. While the punishments are lighter today, a person caught stealing during the days of the Ekpo season in the 1940s would be killed by members of the Ekpo. It is known as a secret society despite the fact that the purpose and activities are widely known by the village. This is due to the fact that everyone must abide by certain laws during Ekpo season. The most important secrets are a series of code words and dance steps taught to initiates and used by members. Knowing these secrets allows members to travel freely during the season, and being caught traveling without knowing the secret terms and dance will result in being arrested.

Prior to the gradual abolition of slavery in Nigeria by British colonial authorities beginning in the mid-1880s, Ibibio society ranked people, in descending order, as freeborn (amanisong), strangers or later immigrants (ududung), and slaves (ifn). Slaves were purchased in slave markets or captured through intergroup wars. Often people gave themselves or their children up as slaves when they could no longer provide for themselves or their families. Slaves were used as offerings in regular ritual human sacrifice, and through the mid-19th century, slaves were also slaughtered by the hundreds upon the death of important chiefs, with the belief that they would serve the deceased chief in the afterlife.

== Religion ==
=== Pre-colonial era ===
Ibibio religion (Inam) was of two dimensions, which centered on the pouring of libation, sacrifice, worship, consultation, communication and invocation of the God of Heaven (Abasi Enyong), God of the Earth (Abasi Isong) and the Supreme Being (Abasi Ibom) by the Constitutional and Religious King/Head of a particular Ibibio Community who was known from the ancient times as 'the Obong-Ikpaisong' (the word 'Obong Ikpaisong' directly interpreted means 'King of the Principalities of the Earth' or 'King of the Earth and the Principalities' or Traditional Ruler').

The second dimension of Ibibio Religion centered on the worship, consultation, invocation, sacrifice, appeasement, etc. of the God of the Heaven (Abasi Enyong) and the God of the Earth (Abasi Isong) through various invisible or spiritual entities (me Ndem) of the various Ibibio Division such as Atakpo Ndem Uruan Inyang, Etefia Ikono, Awa Itam, etc. The priests of these Deities (me Ndem) were the Temple Chief Priests/Priestesses of the various Ibibio Divisions. A particular Ibibio Division could consist of many interrelated autonomous communities or kingdoms ruled by an autonomous Priest-King called Obong-Ikpaisong, assisted by heads of the various large families (Mbong Ekpuk) which make up the Community.

These have been the ancient political and religious system of Ibibio people from time immemorial. Tradition, interpreted in Ibibio language, is 'Ikpaisong'. Tradition (Ikpaisong) in Ibibio custom embodies the religious and political system. The word 'Obong' in Ibibio language means 'ruler, king, lord, chief, head' and is applied depending on the office concern. In reference to the Obong-Ikpaisong, the word 'Obong' means 'king'. In reference to the village head, the word means 'chief'. In reference to the head of the families (Obong Ekpuk), the word means 'Head' In reference to God, the word means 'lord'. In reference to the head of the various societies – e.g. 'Obong Obon', the word means 'head or leader'.

==== Sacred lands (Akai) ====
Scattered throughout each village were sacred lands, akai (forest). They were called akai because no one was permitted to clear them for cultivation. All burial grounds, shrines for the village deities and spots for secret societies such as Ekpo Onyoho, Ekoong, Idiong, Ekong, were sacred. Everything in these places were equally sacred. Non-members of the secret societies were not permitted to enter the spots set aside for such secret societies, even for the collection of firewood, sticks, fruits (like mkpook), vegetables (like afang and odusa) or snails, or to hunt the animals which abounded in the forests. The explanation is simple. If non-members were allowed to enter any secret society akai they might in due course discover the secrets of their time-honoured society, and wicked people might even desecrate the graves of their ancestors hence the ban.

==== The Soul and life after death ====
Like many Ibibio words, Ukpong ('soul') has four meanings. First, ethereal body, secondly, soul, thirdly, spirit, and fourthly, over-soul; the last always lives in the house of Abasi Ibom and it is quite separate from the individuality which between incarnations stays in the country of the dead. Though over-soul and spirit are combined, much of the Spirit is contained in that portion of the ego which is incarnated.

According to Talbot, it is the soul proper that spends part of its time as a were-animal or in a bush-beast in the forest or water and is called Ukpong Ikot, or bush-soul. The shadow is not thought to be connected with the ethereal body but to be an emanation of the soul and therefore to be directly affected by any action on it. The majority of the Ibibio believe that a person's soul can be invoked into his shadow, which is made to appear in a basin of water. The shadow is then speared, his blood is seen in the water in the basin and the man dies.

The Ibibio believe that after death the same kind of existence is led as during life on earth; for example, farmers, blacksmiths, hunters, and fishermen will continue with their former occupations while social intercourse and amusements will also proceed as before. The scenery, houses, crops and animals of the next world have the same appearance as in this world but only those beasts, plants and foodstuffs which have been sacrificed in honour of the dead are transported there. The land of the dead, like that of the living, is believed to be divided into various countries, towns, villages and lineages where different communities of people live as on earth. At death every man goes to the particular part inhabited by his people.

==== Obot and essien emana ====
Obot ('Nature')

The Ibibio believe in obot, that is, the individual creation of persons by God. If someone is wild, they say he was created that way; if he is kind, again that is how he was created by God to be; if he is poor or rich, that was his lot, and so on; effectively, there was nothing anyone could do to alter his lot, for he was moulded that way.

Essien emana ('Destiny')

The Ibibio also believe in the same way in destiny, essien emana or uwa. For instance, if a person died accidentally, this was how he had died in his previous incarnation and therefore he had to die that way. If he was rich, he was so in his previous incarnation and must be so now; if he was brilliant, that was how he was destined to be, etc. He could, however, reverse the situation if he consulted the Mbia Idiong, who alone could tell him what to do. The diviners could help him pin-point what it was he had done in his previous incarnation which was affecting his present life. They could then prescribe to him what to do to remedy the worsening situation. If the instructions were strictly followed, the position could be reversed, they believed. For instance, if a person had no issue a diviner might tell him that he had killed innocent children in his previous incarnation, and that the parents of the deceased and the general public had cursed him, saying that he would not have any issue and would continue to kill innocent children throughout his incarnations unless he gave certain things as sacrificial offerings. When the Mbia Idiong told him what the things were and he had offered them as sacrifices to Mother Earth, the Ibibio believed the situation would be reversed; otherwise, he would remain childless.

=== Colonial and post-colonial eras ===
The Ibibio were introduced to Christianity through the work of early missionaries in the nineteenth century. Samuel Bill started his work at Ibeno. He established the Qua Iboe Church which later spread places in the middle belt of Nigeria. Later, other churches were also introduced e.g. The Apostolic church. Independent churches such as Deeper Life Bible Church, came into the area in the second part of the twentieth century. Today Ibibio people are predominantly Christian.

=== The Bible in the Ibibio language ===
History was made on the 27th day of August 2020 that the first-ever Ibibio Bible translation was presented at Ibom Hall in Uyo, the capital of Akwa Ibom. Published by the 200-year-old, American based International Bible Society (Biblica), the publishers of the NIV Version.

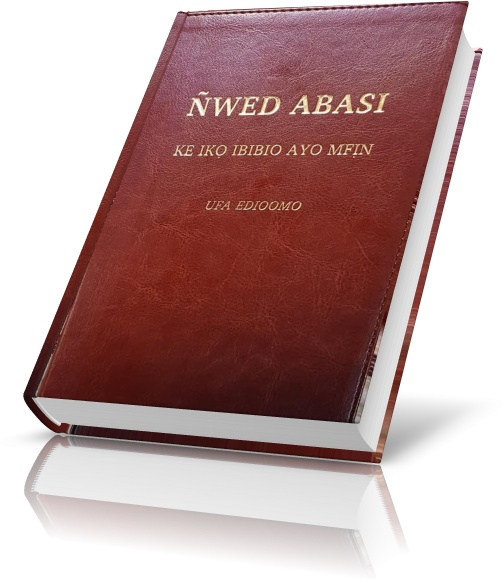
Nwed Abasi ke Iko Ibibio Ayo Mfin – Ufa Edioomo

The Ibibio Bible was translated by Ibibio professors, including Professors Margaret Mary Okon, Bassey Okon, Eno-Abasi Urua, Inimbom Akpan, Udo Etuk, as well as Dr. Paulinus Noah, Dr. Effiong Ekpenyong and Rev. Fr. Dr. Donatus Udoette, a theologian who is well versed in Greek.

Nwed Abasi ke Iko Ibibio Ayo Mfin (Book of God in Words of Ibibio Today) translates to "The Bible in Modern-Day Ibibio Language."

== Arts and culture ==
=== Masks ===
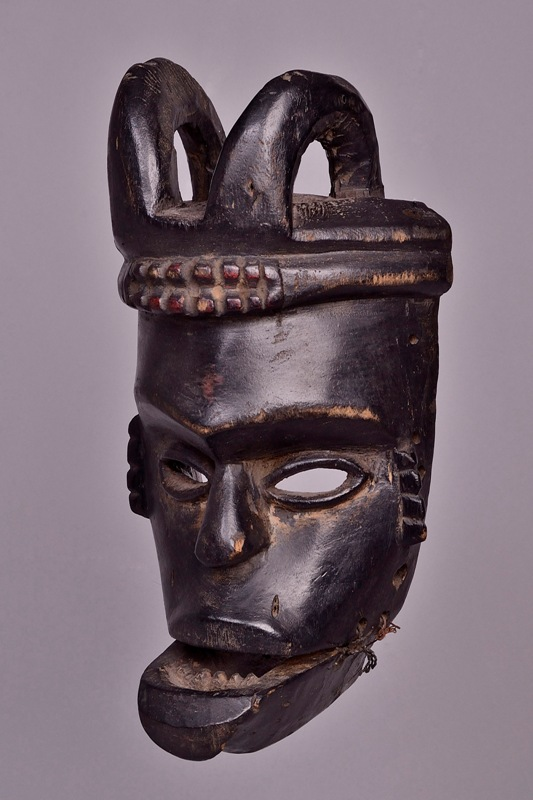
An intentionally "ugly" mask of the Ekpo society with an articulated jaw

The masks and accoutrements of the Ekpo society make up the greatest works of art in Ibibio society. Ibibio often purposefully play with proportions in their masks to distort the face. A component that appears often in Ibibio masks is an articulated lower jaw. Ibibio people have an overarching theme of contrasting male and female masks by using dark and light colors respectively. These masks are not always performed together, but there is a general understanding of their opposing relationship. Feminine masks are decorated with light colors such as white. Their features are delicate to emphasize their femininity. On the other hand, masculine masks use dark colors to represent the mystic forces of the forest. These masks often have large features and are created to be intentionally ugly. They achieve this by distorting the features in unnatural manners such as having bulging eyes or misplaced mouths. Many deformities present in the masks come from naturally occurring human diseases and illnesses. One that is often depicted is gangosa, a part of yaws. Signs of baldness and walking sticks also show up often in order to portray symbols of karma and old age. Men's costumes incorporate natural materials from the wilderness such as raffia, and seed pod rattles. Women's costumes use materials such as light colored cloth to represent the order of living in the village.

==== Ekpo ====
The masks of the Ekpo societies were used to elicit fear and execute social control. The most common type of mask is one made for the face with waist-length raffia attached. The effect of the masks and their intimidating quality is part of what gives them their power, in addition to the long history of the Ekpo. To put on an Ekpo mask is to surrender earthly identity and assume an ancestral one. Masks used may be ones owned by deceased ancestors, ones made to look like ancestors, or ones made to resemble to village heroes. Many are carved from lightweight wood called ukot (palm wine tree). This makes them easier to wear and move around in. For additional support, the mask is secured to the wearer's head with a rope, and a horizontal piece of wood may be inserted into the mask in order to bite into. In addition to the raffia on the mask itself, performers also wear a knee-length raffia skirt. The lower legs, arms, and hands are painted with charcoal. New raffia is added to the mask each season, and is displayed in the off-season in a family or village shrine.

=== Ikot Ekpene ===
The Ibibio are known for their woodcarvings, raffia-weavings, and pottery making. Ikot Ekpene is a town in Nigeria known for its marketplace in which crafts are sold to both tourists and middle-class Nigerians. While the Ibibio are not known for metalworking, there is a significant number of craftspeople making this type of art to be sold.

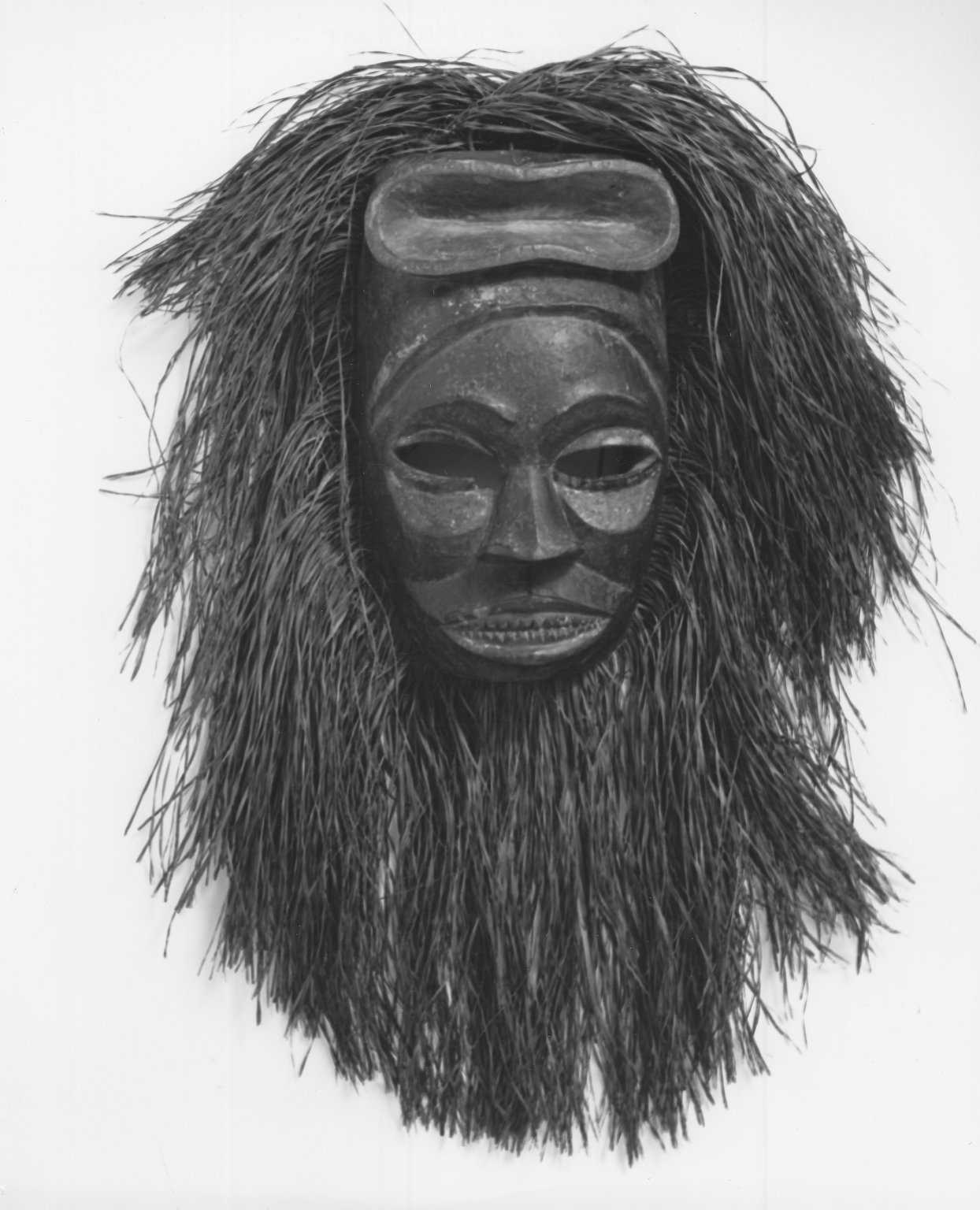
Ekpo society mask with attached raffia fringe

Most metalwork objects produced have a practical purpose rather than a decorative one. Despite this, Ibibio coffins tend to be highly decorative. They feature ornamental painted metal motifs, colorful plastic sheets, and glass panels on the sides.

Many people who carve Ekpo masks live in Ikot Ekpene.

=== Body adornment ===
Both temporary and permanent body modifications are used. Rhythm and nature are both considerable motifs at play in the designs. Hairdressing, body painting, and body modification are the main focus of body art performed by the Ibibio. Intentional fattening of young women is another culturally important aspect of the Ibibio.

==== Body painting ====
In painting, the goal is to emphasize rather than obscure the wearer's face or other parts of the body. The symbol of the dot plays a key role in the understanding of beauty. Okon Umetuk in his article "Body Art in Ibibio Culture", states that;

A 'dot' is regarded as the only perfect mark to indicate and summarize beauty in Ibibio culture.

Evidence of this is found in the abundance of dots that appear on the faces and bodies of decorated individuals. An 'X' symbol may be applied to the forehead, wrists, and ankles as a way to mark mediation. When worn by a diviner, it may mark a connection with himself and the gods as well as his people. Members of a ritual may wear it to symbolize peace, humility, as well as acceptance.

Odung is a type of body painting that is used for events such as marriage, childbirth, coming-of-age, and death. It may also be used to show a man's status in the Ekpo society. This process is commonly used among women. It is often done after the birth of a child. The stains that are left afterwards can stay on the skin for up to three months. Professionals are typically the ones who paint others, and the process may take from five to eight hours to complete.

Iduot is another form of body painting which symbolizes fertility. The pigment is taken from crushed camwood and then added to water which produces a red substance. People's palms, feet, legs, and faces are decorated with the pigment. The Ibibio use it partially for its bleaching effect. After continuous usage, it produces a smooth and light skin complexion.

Modern versions of face and body decoration such as eye shadow, lipstick, and eyeliner are used by contemporary Ibibio people. Body decoration has a long history in the Ibibio and these products help their cultural expression in a convenient way, but are not a new form of expression. Substances such as the atido were used for eyelid decoration long before modern eye shadow. As in many other cultures around the world, Ibibio women generally put heavy emphasis on the eye when it comes to make-up.

==== Hairstyles ====
Hair styles are another way for the Ibibio to symbolically mark certain occasions. Styles of hair in Ibibioland include both elaborate braiding with and without the use of thread. Some styles are symbolic of stories or events that have occurred in the wearer's life. If a married woman has unkempt hair, this indicates that someone she is close to, typically her husband, a child, or another relative, has died. Other styles may be indicative of age, marital status, or social standing. There also exists hairstyles without any meaning that are simply worn for fashion purposes.

== Ibibio tribes and ethnic groups ==
The Ibibio are divided into the following subcultural groups: Eastern Ibibio or Ibibio Proper; Western Ibibio or Annang; Northern Ibibio or Enyong; Southern Ibibio or Eket and Riverine Ibibio or Uruan.

== Ibibio numbers ==
Ibibio cardinal and ordinal numbers from zero to ten:

No.	English	Ibibio	Ordinal
0	Zero	Ikpoikpo	N/A
1	One	Kèèd	Àkpá (1st)
2	Two	Íbà	Udiana (2nd)
3	Three	Ítá	Ọyọhọ Ítá (3rd)
4	Four	Ínàañ	Ọyọhọ Ínàañ (4th)
5	Five	Ítíòn	Ọyọhọ Ítíòn (5th)
6	Six	Ítíòkèèd	Ọyọhọ Ítíòkèèd (6th)
7	Seven	Ítíábà	Ọyọhọ Ítíábà (7th)
8	Eight	Ítíáìtà	Ọyọhọ Ítíáìtà (8th)
9	Nine	Úsúk-kèèd	Ọyọhọ Úsúk-kèèd (9th)
10	Ten	Dúòp	Ọyọhọ Dúòp (10th)
11	Eleven	Dúòp ye/mme Kèèd	Ọyọhọ Dúòp ye/mme Kèèd (11th)
12	Twelve	Dúòp ye/mme Íbà	Ọyọhọ Dúòp ye/mme Íbà (12th)
13	Thirteen	Dúòp ye/mme Ítá	Ọyọhọ Dúòp ye/mme Ítá (13th)
14	Fourteen	Dúòp ye/mme Ínàañ	Ọyọhọ Dúòp ye/mme Ínàañ (14th)
15	Fifteen	Èfịd	Ọyọhọ Èfịd (15th)

Base system

The Ibibio language uses a unique base-20 system for numbers up to 100.

No.	English	Ibibio	Ordinal
20	Twenty	Edíp	Ọyọhọ Edíp (20th)
30	Thirty	Edíp ye/mme Dúòp	Ọyọhọ Edíp ye/mme Dúòp (30th)
40	Forty	Ábà	Ọyọhọ Edíp ye/mme Dúòp (40th)
50	Fifty	Ábà ye/mme Dúòp	Ọyọhọ Ábà ye/mme Dúòp (50th)
60	Sixty	Atà	Ọyọhọ Atà (60yj)
70	Seventy	Atà ye/mme Dúòp	Ọyọhọ Atà ye/mme Dúòp (70th)
80	Eighty	Anàñ	Ọyọhọ Anàñ (80th)
90	Ninety	Anàñ ye/mme Dúòp	Ọyọhọ Anàñ ye/mme Dúòp (90th)
100	One Hundred	Íkíè	Ọyọhọ Íkíè (100th)
1000	One thousand	Tosin Kèèd	Ọyọhọ Tosin [Kèèd] (1000th)
2000	Two thousand	Tosin Íbà	Ọyọhọ Tosin Íbà (2000th)

If the number is not divisible by 20 or can have 15 added to the base number (ex. 35 – Edíp mme Èfịd [20 +15]), then the number will be built off the base-20 system (ex. 34 – Edíp mme Dúòp ye/mme Ínàañ).

== See also ==
- Abakua
- Aro Confederacy
- British West Africa
- Eket
- Garifuna people
- Ikot Udo Abia
- Medefidrin
- Mami Wata
- Niger Delta
- Southeastern Nigeria
- Ibibio Americans
