= Waawa =

Igbo subgroup in Nigeria

Waawa Wawa, Ndi Waawa/Wawa
Languages
- Waawa Igbo, Nigerian Pidgin

Religion
- Christianity (majority Catholic, Anglican), Omenani

Related ethnic groups
- Igbo, Nsukka

The Waawa clan of Northern Igboland, also referred to as Ndi Waawa, Wawa People, are a unique sub-group of the Igbo people in Enugu and Ebonyi State, Nigeria, consisting of several communities, who all speak a unique dialect of Igbo called Waawa. The most notable among these are the Agbaja and Ngwo which consist of peoples between the wooded lands of Awka (capital of Anambra State) to the rocky valleys of Enugu (capital of Enugu State). The Agbaja are made up of communities in present-day Ngwo clan, Udi, Ezeagu, Umulokpa, Igbo-Etiti,Enugu East Local Government Areas. Other notable parts of the Waawa clan include Nkanu, Nsukka, Abia (not be confused with people from Abia State), Nike, Agbani, Owo, and other communities in Enugu State. The Waawa are most notably associated with Chief Onyeama's people from Eke, who was the paramount ruler of Agbaja in the early 20th century.

== Chief Onyeama of Eke ==
Onyeama was born circa 1870s, the youngest of the ten children of Özö Omulu Onwusi, a polygamous titled man of means, and an only son of his mother – Chinazungwa Ijeonyeabo of nearby Ebe community. At 7, his father initiated him into the masquerade society. A puberty rite of passage, this showed the promise of the young man. Onyeama's father died thereafter. His mother also died, probably killed for poisoning a man who had threatened her son Onyeama with violence.

Brought up by his half-brother, Amadiezeoha Nwankwo-Onwusi, Onyeama worked hard and made his mark in business. He traveled to famous Aro-controlled trading centers, including Abiriba, Arochukwu, Arondizuogu, Bende, Oguta, Uburu, etc. When British rule reached Eke in 1908, Onyeama was rich enough to buy his way into the Ozo title society and to marry a local beauty, Afia Nwirediagu, and later Gwachi Ebue.

Slowly but surely, Onyeama got the colonists to award him the “Warrant Chiefdom” of Eke. He took power and defined it. Onyeama saw himself as an absolute ruler whose authority could not be easily flouted. But the King of Onitsha, Obi Okosi I, also reigned. No Igbo king questioned the might of the supreme monarch of Onitsha, let alone supposedly “lesser chiefs” from the north.

Onyeama signaled quite early that the reign of the Obi of Onitsha was history turned upside down, because he considered the entire monarchy of Onitsha a sub-colonial setup of recent immigrants from the Benin Kingdom. If anything, he (Onyeama) was in the league of the Oba of Benin or Ooni of Ife, the Yoruba monarch. This set the stage for a looming showdown between the kings of the northeast Igbo (called the Wawa) and southwest Igbo (called the Ijekeebé).

And so it was that at the gathering of Igbo kings in 1928, all major kings and chiefs in the old Onitsha province (including Enugu) and beyond assembled in Enugu to welcome Captain W. Buchanan-Smith, the recently appointed lieutenant-governor of southern Nigeria provinces. The Obi naturally occupied the highest seat of honor reserved for the supposed traditional ruler of Igbo nation. When Onyeama came in later with his entourage of security men, chiefs and Igbanküda drummers, he was outraged by the Obi's assumed position of supreme authority in his domain.

Onyeama ordered the immediate removal of the powerful King of Onitsha. A scene ensued with the District Officer trying to placate Onyeama. Furiously, as legend has it, he uttered, “Wa” (the local lingo for “No”); for emphasis and as a mark of immutability, he stated: “Wa–wa!” [Never!] He turned and decreed to the colonial officers: “If that man is still occupying that seat when I come back, the leopard will eat him.” Onyeama got his way and prevailed as the greatest king in town! Considered an upstart by those who have had longer socioeconomic intercourse with the British, Onyeama did not make himself many friends. A record was waxed in the 1930s accusing him of burying an unfaithful wife alive! A court order forced the German company that waxed the slanderous record to withdraw it from circulation. This and other image-destructive stories of absolute tyranny, wife-snatching and even murder have never really removed from the legend of Onyeama. His people looked at him with mixture of awe and admiration. His secret police (made up of handpicked, local wrestling champions) struck so much fear into both chiefs and commoners that generations still respect the might of this great king.

The current traditional ruler Of Oma-Eke is Igwe Harold Chinwendu Onuoha, Eze-Oha I.

== Culture ==
Amongst the Waawa people there is a lot of cultural diversity, and each locality can be identified by their unique style of music and cultural dance. Some styles by region include:

- ogene around the Anambra borders.
- the "Ibone" (Mmanwu) festival of Umulokpa and some towns in Ezeagu LGA.
- egwu-igede in Udi and environs.
- abia, particularly in Eke. The annual Abia-Nsi festival held in Eke, showcases the unique abia music style, and is attended by the surrounding communities.
- ubo in Nkanu.
- igba ijele in Umulokpa.
- ikorodo in Nsukka region.
- Odo festival in Ngwo, Ebe, Egede, and environs.

== Food ==
One of the most important vegetables in Waawa cuisine and in the Igbo culture in general is the yam tuber. This is considered the Igbo staple crop and has been dedicated deities such as Njoku Ji, the yam god. Igbo cuisine includes other vegetables such as Pumpkin seed, used to make a soup called Egusi, Bitter leaf which is made into a soup and Okra, of which its name stems from the Igbo language.

The Waawa people eat fufu or pounded yam, which is known locally as utara with a variety of unique soups e.g. ohé-ede, made with cocoyam, ohé-nsala and ohé-onugbu made with bitterleaf.

Aside from than the common Igbo foods, traditional Waawa food includes a series of dishes referred to as agworo-agwo. Many of these dishes are made with tapioca or cassava, such as abacha, which is known locally as okoto in Udi, and jigbo in other areas of Waawaland. It is eaten with ugba which is known in this part of the country as akpaka. Cassava is also made into ighu, which are larger flakes of the vegetable, prepared like abacha.

All kinds of bean dishes are native and unique to the Waawa, such as agbugbu (fiofio), achicha, akidi and okpa (which is a popular street food similar to moin moin but made with bambara bean). Okpa di oku meaning The okpa is hot, is a phrase quintessential to Enugu. All of these traditional dishes are available in fast-food joints within the Enugu metropolis.

== Waawa Dialect ==
Each Waawa community has a distinct dialect of Igbo, which are somewhat related to each other but quite different from Central Igbo language

English	Central Igbo	Nkanu/Eke dialect of Waawa	Nsukka dialect of Waawa
how?/what? How is it going? (informal)	kedu?	ndeé? (in-DAY)	Ime-aga? (emaa-ga)
welcome	nnộ	dee-jé, tee-je	Alā (Ah-La)
Thank you	Dālụ́/Imẹ̄lá.	dee-mé	I mee
here	ebe-a	nkunwa, nonwa	"wabe-ha"
yes	eh	eeyi	"eh"
no	mba	wa, wawa	
foot/leg	ukwu	okpa	"ukwu"
dog	nkita	nkuta	"ugo-du/ngta"
now	ugbua	kunma, ki-taa	"wo-shua ha"
stomach	afo	efo, eghfo	eho
divination	afa	efa, eghfa	ehà
name	aha	eghfa	ehá
clothes	akwa	ogodo	ekwa

The Nsukka variety is notably quite different to the rest as it said to take influence from the Northern borders of Benue State, it bears many similarities with Northern Ebonyi State dialects, notably tending towards the e sound in place of 'a' and h in place of f. For example, the word aka, which means hand in Igbo is pronounced eka in the Nsukka region. Likewise the word afo, which means stomach in Igbo Language is pronounced eho in Nsukka dialect. This linguistic region covers more than just Nsukka Local Government Area but a large part of Northern Waawaland. In the Nkanu kingdom/region of the Waawa Nation, the 'mgbochiume mkpi'gh, is added to f whereas the f is silent during pronunciation. During pronunciation, the beginning and ending vowels are heard whereas the rest of the other alphabets{at the centre of the word} are dead silent and transformed into air when the word is pronounced such as efa-eghfa(by drawing in air as the mouth is opened i.e. breathing in and closing the mouth as the air is released i.e. breathing out).

== See also ==
- Enugu State
- Nsukka
- Igbo people
- Igbo
- Daybreak in Udi
