= List of writers by name: E =

The following is a List of writers by name whose last names begin with E:

Abbreviations: ch = children's; d = drama, screenwriting; f = fiction; nf = non-fiction; p = poetry, song lyrics

== Ea–El ==
- Eadmer (c. 1060 – c. 1126, England, nf)
- Edward Eager (1911–1964, US, d/ch)
- Kathleen Eagle (born 1947, US, f)
- Aled Eames (1921–1996, Wales, nf)
- Marion Eames (1921–2007, Wales, f)
- Rae Earl (born 1971, England/Australia, nf)
- John Earle (c. 1601–1665, England, nf)
- Amelia Earhart (1897–1939, US, nf)
- Anthony Earnshaw (1924–2001, England, f/nf)
- Joan Adeney Easdale (1913–1998, England, p)
- Raymond Sarif Easmon (1913–1997, Sierra Leone, d/f)
- Edward Eastwick (1814–1883, England, nf)
- Alice Eather (1988 or 1989–2017, Australia, p)
- Bendix Joachim Ebbell (1869–1937, Norway, ch/d)
- Clara Thue Ebbell (1880–1971, Norway, ch/nf)
- Martin Ebbertz (born 1962, Germany, ch)
- Isabelle Eberhardt (1877–1904, Switzerland/Algeria, f/nf)
- Richard Eberhart (1904–2005, US, p)
- Irmengarde Eberle (1898–1979, US, ch), pseudonyms Phyllis Ann Carter and Allyn Allen
- Johann Eberlin von Günzburg (c. 1470–1533, Germany, nf)
- Georg Ebers (1837–1898, Germany, nf/f)
- Abo El Seoud El Ebiary (1910–1969, Egypt, d/p)
- Mary Emma Ebsworth (1794–1881, England, d)
- Karl Egon Ebert (1801–1882, Austrian E/Bohemia, p/d)
- Marie von Ebner-Eschenbach (1830–1916, Austrian E/Moravia, f)
- Moussa Ould Ebnou (born 1956, Mauritania, f)
- Charlotte O'Conor Eccles (1863–1911, Ireland/England, f/nf), pseudonym Hal Godfrey
- Laurence Echard (c. 1670–1730, England, nf)
- Aboul-Qacem Echebbi (1909–1934, Tunisia, p)
- Esteban Echeverría (1805–1851, Argentina, p/f/nf)
- Jennifer Echols (living, US, f/ch)
- Michael Echeruo (born 1937, Nigeria, nf)
- Dietrich Eckart (1868–1923, Germany, p/nf)
- Johann Peter Eckermann (1792–1854, Germany, p/nf)
- Robyn Eckersley (born 1958, Australia, nf)
- Allan W. Eckert (1931–2011, US, f/ch/d)
- Meister Eckhart (c. 1260 – c. 1328, Germany, nf)
- Elaine Howard Ecklund (born 1973, US, nf)
- Ernst Eckstein (1845–1900, Germany, f/nf/p)
- Umberto Eco (1932–2016, Italy, nf/f)
- Arthur Eddington (1882–1944, England, nf)
- E. R. Eddison (1882–1945, England, f)
- C. M. Eddy, Jr. (1896–1967, US, f)
- Amatoritsero Ede (born 1973, Nigeria/Canada, p)
- Inger Edelfeldt (born 1956, Sweden, f/p/ch)
- Dorothy Eden (1912–1982, N Zealand, f)
- Emily Eden (1797–1869, England, f)
- Frederick Eden (1766–1809, England, nf)
- Wiebke Eden (born 1968, Germany, nf/f)
- Richard Edes (1555–1604, England, nf)
- Johannes Edfelt (1904–1997, Sweden, p/nf)
- David Edgar (born 1948, d)
- John George Edgar (1834–1864, Scotland/England, f/nf/ch)
- Stephen Edgar (born 1951, Australia, p)
- Arabella Edge (living, England/Australia, f)
- Ross Edgley (born 1985, England, nf)
- Maria Edgeworth (1768–1849, Ireland/England, f/nf/ch)
- Richard Lovell Edgeworth (1744–1817, Ireland/England, nf)
- Rosemary Edghill (born 1956, US, f)
- May Edginton (1883–1957, England, f/d)
- Joseph Edkins (艾約瑟, 1823–1905, England/China, nf)
- James Edmeston (1791–1867, England, p)
- Lauris Edmond (1924–2000, N Zealand, p/f)
- Walter D. Edmonds (1903–1998, US, f/ch/nf)
- Edogawa Ranpo (江戸川乱歩, 1894–1965, Japan, f/nf), pseudonym of Tarō Hirai (平井太郎)
- Chike Frankie Edozien (born 1970, Nigeria/US, nf)
- Harriet Edquist (living, Australia, nf)
- Robert Edric (born 1956, England, f)
- J. T. Edson (1928–2014, England, f)
- Russell Edson (1928–2014, US, p/f)
- Cordelia Edvardson (1929–2012, Sweden, f/nf/p)
- Richard Edwardes (1525–1566, England, p/d)
- Amelia Edwards (1831–1892, England, f/nf)
- Annie Edwards (c. 1830–1896, England, f)
- Cassie Edwards (born 1936, US, f)
- David Edwards (1929–2018, England, nf)
- David Edwards (born 1962, England, nf)
- David Miall Edwards (1873–1941, Wales, nf)
- Dorothy Edwards (1902–1934, Wales/England, f)
- Dorothy Edwards (1914–1982, England, ch)
- Fanny Winifred Edwards (1876–1959, Wales, ch/d)
- G. B. Edwards (1899–1976, Guernsey/England, f)
- Hywel Teifi Edwards (1934–2010, Wales, nf)
- Jorge Edwards (1931–2023, Chile, f/nf)
- Kim Edwards (born 1958, US, f)
- Lewis Edwards (1909–1987, Wales, nf)
- Michael Edwards (born 1938, England/France, p/nf)
- Monica Edwards (1912–1998, England, ch), born Monica le Doux Newton
- Owen Morgan Edwards (1858–1920, Wales, nf)
- Rhian Edwards (living, Wales/England, p)
- Roger Edwards (1811–1886, Wales, nf/f)
- Thomas Edwards (fl. 1587–1595, England, p)
- Thomas Edwards (1779–1858, Wales, nf), pseudonym Caerfallwch
- Imogen Edwards-Jones (born 1968, England, f/nf)
- Åke Edwardson (born 1953, Sweden, f)
- Frederik van Eeden (1860–1932, Netherlands, nf)
- Richard Eedes (died 1686, England, nf)
- Jan Eekhout (1900–1978, Netherlands, f/p)
- Gaston-Paul Effa (born 1965, Cameroon/France, f/nf)
- Charline Effah (born 1977, Gabon/France, f)
- Justus van Effen (1684–1735, Netherlands, nf)
- George Alec Effinger (1947–2002, US, f)
- Philip Effiong (1925–2003, Nigeria, nf)
- Kossi Efoui (born 1962, Togo, f/d)
- Victor Eftimiu (1889–1972, Albania/Romania, p/d)
- Yordan Eftimov (born 1971, Bulgaria, p/nf)
- Brendon Egan (born 1984, N Zealand, nf)
- Greg Egan (born 1961, Australia, f)
- Pierce Egan (1772–1849, England, nf)
- Pierce Egan the Younger (1814–1880, England, f/nf)
- José María Egas (1896–1982, Ecuador, p)
- Tom Egeland (born 1959, Norway, f)
- Elizabeth Egerton (1626–1663, England, p/d)
- George Egerton (1859–1945, Australia/England, f), pseudonym of Mary Chavelita Dunne Bright
- Helen Merrill Egerton (1866–1951, Canada), p/nf)
- Rowland Egerton-Warburton (1804–1891, England, p)
- Sarah Fyge Egerton (1668–1723, England, p)
- Peter Egge (1869–1959, Norway, f/nf/d)
- Arnljot Eggen (1923–2009, Norway, p/d/ch)
- Jo Eggen (born 1952, Norway, p)
- Torgrim Eggen (born 1958, Norway, f/nf)
- Werner Eggerath (1900–1977, Germany, nf)
- Dave Eggers (born 1970, US, nf)
- Elizabeth Eggleston (1934–1976, Australia, nf)
- David Eggleton (born 1952, N Zealand, p/nf)
- Jill Eggleton (living, N Zealand, ch)
- Ólafur Egilsson (1564–1639, Iceland, nf)
- Sveinbjörn Egilsson (1791–1852, Iceland, nf/p)
- Werner Egk (1901–1983, Germany, f/nf)
- Thorbjørn Egner (1912–1990, Norway, d/ch)
- Elen Egryn (1807–1876, Wales, d/nf)
- José María Eguren (1874–1942, Peru, p/nf)
- Margriet Ehlen (born 1943, Netherlands, p/nf)
- Albert Ehrenstein (1886–1950, Austria/US, p/nf)
- Terry Ehret (born 1955, US, p)
- Marianne Ehrmann (1755–1795, Switzerland, f/nf)
- Rokusuke Ei (永六輔, 1933–2016, Japan, p/nf)
- Günter Eich (1907–1972, Germany/Austria, p/d/nf)
- Joseph Freiherr von Eichendorff (1788–1857, Germany/Silesia, p/f/nf)
- Ludwig Eichrodt (1827–1892, Germany, p/d)
- Odd Eidem (1913–1988, Norway, f/nf)
- Marit Eikemo (born 1971, Norway, nf/f)
- Eilífr kúlnasveinn (fl. 12th or 13th c., Iceland, p)
- Ellen Einan (1931–2013, Norway, p)
- Stefán Einarsson (1897–1972, Iceland, nf)
- Lena Einhorn (born 1954, Sweden/US, nf/d)
- Albert Einstein (1879–1955, Germany/US, nf)
- Carl Einstein (1885–1940, Germany/France, nf)
- Siegfried Einstein (1919–1983, Germany, p/f/nf)
- Oddný Eir (born 1972, Iceland, f)
- Rawdna Carita Eira (born 1970, Norway, d/p)
- Kristín Eiríksdóttir (born 1981, Iceland, f/p)
- Eyvindur P. Eiríksson (born 1935, Iceland, p/f/d)
- Magnús Eiríksson (1806–1881, Iceland/Denmark, nf)
- Gunnar Ekelöf (1907–1968, Sweden/Turkey, p)
- Vilhelm Ekelund (1890–1949, Sweden, p)
- Dickson Ekhaguere (living, Nigeria, d)
- Kerstin Ekman (born 1933, Sweden, f)
- Christiane Akoua Ekué (born 1954, Togo, f)
- Kaori Ekuni (江國香織, born 1964, Japan, p/nf)
- Nana Ekvtimishvili (born 1978, USSR/Georgia, nf/d/f)
- Cyprian Ekwensi (1921–2007, Nigeria, f/ch)
- Youssouf Amine Elalamy (born 1961, Morocco, f)
- Stephen Elboz (born 1956, England, ch)
- Rachida el-Charni (born 1967, Tunisia, f)
- Anne Elder (1918–1976, Australia, p)
- Josephine Elder (1895–1988, England, ch), pseudonym of Olive Gwendoline Potter
- Flora Eldershaw (1897–1956, Australia, f/nf)
- M. Barnard Eldershaw (Australia, f/nf/d), pseudonym of Marjorie Barnard (1897–1987) and Flora Eldershaw (1897–1956)
- Þórarinn Eldjárn (born 1949, Iceland, p/ch)
- Stevan Eldred-Grigg (born 1952, N Zealand, f/nf)
- Bushra Elfadil (born 1952, Sudan/Saudi Arabia, f)
- Menna Elfyn (born 1952, Wales, p/d/nf)
- Suzette Haden Elgin (1936–2015, US, nf/p/f)
- Safia Elhillo (born 1990, Sudan/US, p)
- Mircea Eliade (1907–1986, Romania/US, nf/f)
- Akhteruzzaman Elias (1943–1997, India/Bangladesh, f)
- John Elias (1774–1841, Wales, nf)
- Norbert Elias (1897–1990, Germany/Netherlands, nf)
- Pepe Eliaschev (1945–2014, Argentina, nf)
- Gyrðir Elíasson (born 1961, Iceland, p/nf)
- Sigurlaugur Elíasson (born 1957, Iceland, p)
- Charles Eliot (1862–1931, England, nf)
- George Eliot (1819–1880, England, f/nf/p), pseudonym of Mary Ann Evans
- T. S. Eliot (1888–1965, US/England, p/nf/d)
- Islwyn Ffowc Elis (1924–2004, Wales, p/nf/f)
- Elisabeth of Wied (1843–1916, Germany/Romania, p/f), pseudonym Carmen Sylva
- Salvador Elizondo (1932–2006, Mexico, f/p/d)
- William B. Ellern (1933–2023, US, f)
- Anne Elliot (1856–1941, England, f), pseudonym Margery Hollis
- Lady Charlotte Elliot (1839–1880, Scotland, p)
- Frances Minto Elliot (1820–1898, nf/f)
- David Elliott (born 1947, US, ch/p)
- Ebenezer Elliott (1781–1849, England, p)
- Janice Elliott (1931–1995, England, f/nf/ch)
- Stephen Elliott (born 1971, US, f/nf)
- Alice Thomas Ellis (1932–2005, England, f/nf), born Ann Margaret Lindholm
- Bret Easton Ellis (born 1964, US, f/d)
- Deborah Ellis (born 1960, Canada, f)
- Edith Ellis (1861–1916, England, f)
- Edwin Ellis (1848–1916, England, p)
- Ellen Elizabeth Ellis (1829–1895, N Zealand, nf)
- George F. Ellis (1903–1972, US, nf)
- H. F. Ellis (1907–2000, England, f)
- Havelock Ellis (1859–1939, England, nf)
- Mari Ellis (1913–2015, Wales, nf)
- Peter Berresford Ellis (born 1943, England, f/nf), pseudonym Peter Tremayne
- Robert Ellis (1812–1875, Wales, p/nf), Bardic name Cynddelw
- Royston Ellis (born 1941, England, f/nf/p)
- Sarah Ellis (born 1952, Canada, ch)
- Sarah Stickney Ellis (1799–1872, England, nf)
- Thomas Iorwerth Ellis (1899–1970, Wales, nf)
- Warren Ellis (born 1968, England, f/d)
- William Charles Ellis (1780–1839, England, nf)
- Harlan Ellison (1934–2018, US, f/d/nf)
- J. T. Ellison (living, US, f)
- Richard Ellmann (1918–1987, US/England, nf)
- Thomas Ellwood (1639–1714, England, nf)
- Ali El-Makk (1937–1992, Sudan, f/nf)
- Ernest Elmore (1901–1957, England, f), pseudonym John Bude
- Salah El-Ouadie (born 1952, Morocco, f/nf)
- Chris Else (born 1942, N Zealand, f/p)
- Gisela Elsner (1937–1992, Germany, f)
- Willem Elsschot (1882–1960, Belgium, p/f)
- Anne Karin Elstad (1938–2012, Norway, f)
- Kristian Elster (1841–1881, Norway, f/nf)
- Magli Elster (1912–1993, Norway, nf/p)
- Torolf Elster (1911–2006, Norway, f/nf)
- Elizabeth Elstob (1683–1756, England, nf)
- Diamela Eltit (born 1947, Chile, f/nf)
- Ben Elton (born 1959, England, d)
- Charles Sutherland Elton (1900–1991, England, nf)
- Oliver Elton (1861–1945, England, nf)
- Paul Éluard (1895–1952, France, p)
- Thordis Elva (living, Iceland, nf/d)
- Sven Elvestad (1884–1934, Norway, f)
- Alfred Elwes (1819–1888, England, ch/nf)
- Roger Elwood (1943–2007, US, f/nf)
- Thomas Elyot (c. 1490–1546, England, nf)
- Odysseas Elytis (1911–1996, Greece, p/nf)

== Em–Ez ==
- Marcellus Emants (1848–1923, Netherlands, f/nf)
- Carolin Emcke (born 1967, Germany, nf)
- Buchi Emecheta (1944–2017, Nigeria/England, f/d/ch)
- E. Nolue Emenanjo (born 1943, Nigeria, nf)
- Claudia Emerson (1957–2014, US, p)
- Ralph Waldo Emerson (1803–1882, US, nf/p)
- Sally Emerson (living, England, f/nf)
- Akwaeke Emezi (born 1987, Nigeria, f)
- Suiin Emi (江見水蔭, 1869–1934, Japan, f/nf)
- Gevorg Emin (1919–1998, USSR/Armenia, p/nf)
- Mihai Eminescu (1850–1889, Moldavia/Romania, p/f/nf)
- Claus Emmelmann (born 1959, Germany, nf)
- Jonathan Emmett (born 1965, England, ch)
- Louis Émond (born 1969, Canada, f)
- William Empson (1906–1984, England, nf/p)
- Yunus Emre (1238–1328, Ottoman E,
- Angella Emurwon (living, Uganda, d)
- Fumiko Enchi (円地文子, 1905–1986, Japan, f/d)
- Francisco Antonio Encina (1874–1965, Chile, nf)
- Alberthiene Endah (living, Indonesia, nf/f)
- Michael Ende (1929–1995, Germany, f/ch)
- Shūsaku Endō (遠藤周作, 1923–1996, Japan, f)
- Deyan Enev (born 1960, Bulgaria, f)
- William Enfield (1741–1797, England, nf)
- Chuah Guat Eng (born 1943, Malaya/Malaysia, f)
- Tan Twan Eng (born 1972, Malaysia, f)
- Johann Jakob Engel (1741–1802, Germany, d/nf)
- Dorothe Engelbretsdatter (1634–1716, Norway, p)
- Leszek Engelking (born 1955, Poland, p/f/nf)
- Friedrich Engels (1820–1895, Germany/England, nf)
- Carl Fredrik Engelstad (1915–1996, Norway, nf/d/f)
- Barry England (1932–2009, England, f/d)
- Edith Mary England (1899 – c. 1979–1981, Australia, f/p)
- Jeremy England (born 1982, US, nf)
- Margarita Engle (born 1951, US, p/ch/f)
- Paul Engle (1908–1991, US, p/f/d)
- Isobel English (1920–1994, England, f/d)
- Enheduanna (2285–2250 BCE, Sumeria, p)
- Toh EnJoe (円城塔, born 1972, Japan, f)
- Ennius (c. 239 – c. 169 BCE, Roman Republic, nf/p)
- Suzanne Enoch (living, US, f)
- Yōji Enokido (榎戸洋司, born 1963, Japan, d/f)
- Per Olov Enquist (1934–2020, Sweden, d/nf/f/ch)
- Anne Enright (born 1962, Ireland, f/nf)
- D. J. Enright (1920–2002, England, p/f/nf)
- Elizabeth Enright (1907–1968, US, ch/f/nf)
- Riemke Ensing (born 1939, N Zealand, p)
- Sam Enthoven (born 1974, England, f)
- Hans Magnus Enzensberger (1929–2022, Germany, p/f), pseudonym Andreas Thalmayr
- József Eötvös (1813–1871, Hungary, nf)
- Fotini Epanomitis (born 1969, Australia, f)
- Epicurus (341–270 BCE, Greece, nf)
- Epimenides (7th or 6th c. BCE, Greece, poet)
- John Eppel (born 1947, S Africa/Zimbabwe, f/p)
- Tony Eprile (born 1955, S Africa/US, f)
- Alan Epstein (fl. 20th c., US, nf)
- Olaudah Equiano (c. 1745–1797, K of Benin, nf)
- Ruth Erat (born 1951, Switzerland, f)
- János Erdélyi (1814–1868, Austria-Hungary, p/nf)
- Louise Erdrich (born 1954, US, f/p/ch)
- Haydar Ergülen (born 1956, Turkey, p)
- Mutlu Ergün-Hamaz (born 1978, Germany, f/nf)
- Dobrica Erić (1936–2019, Yugoslavia/Serbia, f/p/ch)
- John R. Erickson (born 1943, US, ch)
- Rica Erickson (1908–2009, Australia, nf)
- Steve Erickson (born 1950, US, f/nf)
- Endre Lund Eriksen (born 1977, Norway, ch/f)
- Steven Erikson (born 1959, Canada, f), pseudonym of Steve Rune Lundin
- Helena Eriksson (born 1962, Sweden, p)
- Dominika Eristavi (1864–1929, Russian E/USSR, p/f)
- Giorgi Eristavi (1813–1864, Russian E, d/p/nf)
- Raphael Eristavi (1824–1901, Russian E, p/d)
- Anastasia Eristavi-Khoshtaria (1868–1951, Russian E/USSR, f)
- Haukr Erlendsson (died 1334, Iceland/Norway, f/nf)
- Þorsteinn Erlingsson (1858–1914, Iceland, p)
- Annie Ernaux (born 1940, France, f/nf)
- Maria Ernestam (born 1959, Sweden, f)
- Gustav Ernst (born 1944, Austria, d/f)
- Max Ernst (1891–1976, Germany/France, p)
- Paul Ernst (1866–1933, Germany, f/d/nf)
- Walter Ernsting (1920–2005, Germany/Austria, f), pseudonym Clark Darlton
- Annette Mbaye d'Erneville (born 1926, Senegal, d)
- Barbara Erskine (born 1944, England, f)
- Thomas Erskine (1750–1823, Scotland/England, f)
- Susan Ertz (1887–1985, England, f)
- Andreas Eschbach (born 1959, Germany, f/ch)
- Jens Jacob Eschels (1757–1842, Denmark, nf)
- Wolfram von Eschenbach (c. 1160/1180 – c. 1220, Germany, p)
- Ernst Wilhelm Eschmann (1904–1987, Germany, nf/d)
- Edith Escombe (1866–1950, England, f)
- Julio Escoto (born 1944, Honduras, f/nf)
- Margaret Escott (1908–1977, N Zealand, f/d/p)
- Jacinta Escudos (born 1961, El Salvador, f/p/nf)
- Clayton Eshleman (1935–2021, US, p/nf)
- Ivar Eskeland (1927–2055, Norway, nf)
- Zohre Esmaeli (born 1985, Afghanistan/Germany, nf)
- Masuma Esmati-Wardak (fl. 1960s, Afghanistan, nf)
- Martín Espada (born 1957, US, p)
- Florbela Espanca (1894–1930, Portugal, p)
- Tomas Espedal (born 1961, Norway, f)
- Eugenio Espejo (1747–1795, Ecuador, nf)
- Ileana Espinel (1933–2001, Ecuador, p/nf)
- María Fernanda Espinosa (born 1964, Ecuador, nf)
- Javier Abril Espinoza (born 1965, Honduras/Switzerland, p/f/nf)
- Salvador Espriu (1913–1985, Spain, p)
- Jean Louis De Esque (1879–1956, US, f/p)
- Laura Esquivel (born 1950, Mexico, f/d)
- Jill Alexander Essbaum (born 1971, US, p/f)
- Alter Esselin (1889–1974, Russian E/US, p)
- Ahmed Essop (1931–2019, India/S Africa, f/p)
- Mohamed Fadel Ismail Ould Es-Sweyih (1949 or 1951–2002, W Sahara, nf)
- Claude Esteban (1935–2006, France, p)
- Maggie Estep (1963–2014, US, p/f)
- Sofia Ester (born 1978, Portugal, f)
- Péter Esterházy (1950–2016, Hungary, f/nf)
- Eleanor Estes (1906–1988, US, ch)
- Ezequiel Martínez Estrada (1895–1964, Argentina, f/nf/p)
- Salvat Etchart (1924–1985, France/Canada, f)
- George Etherege (c. 1636 – c. 1692, England/France, d)
- Jun Etō (江藤淳, 1932–1999, Japan, nf)
- Femi Euba (born 1941, Nigeria, d/f)
- Eubulus (fl. late 370s or 360s BCE, Greece, d)
- Juan Pablo Suazo Euceda (born 1972, Honduras, nf/f/ch)
- Euclid of Megara (c. 435 – c. 365 BCE, Greece, nf)
- Eugenia (Lady of Quality) (early 18th c., England, nf)
- Richard Euringer (1891–1953, Germany, nf)
- Euripides (c. 480 – c. 406 BCE, Salamis/Athens, d)
- Evagrius Ponticus (345–399 CE, Roman E, nf)
- Abel Evans (1675–1737, England, p)
- Anne Evans (1820–1870, England, p)
- Arthur Evans (1851–1941, England, nf)
- Arthur Benoni Evans (1781–1854, England, nf)
- Beriah Gwynfe Evans (1848–1927, Wales, nf/d)
- Christine Evans (born 1943, England/Wales, p/cs)
- Christmas Evans (1766–1838, Wales, nf)
- Daniel Evans (1792–1846, Wales, p), pseudonym Daniel Ddu o Geredigion
- Daniel Silvan Evans (1818–1903, Wales, nf)
- Diana Evans (born 1971, England, f/nf)
- Donald Evans (born 1940, Wales, p)
- Emrys Evans (1891–1966, Wales, nf)
- George Essex Evans (1863–1909, England/Australia, p)
- Gillian Evans (living, England, nf)
- Gwynfor Evans (1912–2005, Wales, nf)
- Hugh Evans (1854–1934, Wales, nf/ch)
- I. O. Evans (1894–1977, S Africa/England, f)
- John Evans (1823–1908, England, nf)
- Katherine Evans and Sarah Cheevers (1618–1692; 1608–1664, England, nf)
- Margiad Evans (1909–1958, England/Wales, p/f/nf), pseudonym of Peggy Eileen Whistler
- Mari Evans (1919–2017, US, p/nf/d)
- Matilda Jane Evans (1827–1886, England/Australia, f), pseudonym Maud Jean Franc
- Nicholas Evans (1950–2022, England, d/f)
- Paul Evans (1945–1991, England, p)
- Richard J. Evans (born 1947, England, nf)
- Sebastian Evans (1830–1909, England, nf/p)
- Theophilus Evans (1693–1767, Wales, nf)
- Thomas Saunders Evans (1816–1889, England, p/nf)
- William Evans (1883–1968, Wales, p), pseudonym Wil Ifan
- Albert Evans-Jones (1895–1970, Wales, p/d), Bardic name Cynan
- Bernardine Evaristo (born 1959, England, f)
- Conceição Evaristo (born 1946, Brazil, f/p)
- John Evelyn (1620–1706, England nf/p)
- Sigurd Evensmo (1912–1978, Norway, nf/d/f)
- H. D. Everett (1851–1923, England, f), pseudonym Theo Douglas
- James Everett (1784–1872, England, nf)
- Evelyn Everett-Green (1856–1932, England/Madeira, f/ch)
- William Everson (1912–1994, US, p)
- George Every (1909–2003, England, nf/p)
- Evliya Çelebi (1611–1682, Ottoman E, nf)
- Zdravka Evtimova (born 1959, Bulgaria, f)
- Gavin Ewart (1916–1995, England, p)
- Walter Ewbank (1918–2014, India/England, nf)
- Hanns Heinz Ewers (1871–1943, Germany, p/nf/f)
- John K. Ewers (1904–1978, Australia, f/p)
- Juliana Horatia Ewing (1841–1885, England, ch)
- Barbara Ewing (born 1939, N Zealand/England, d/f)
- Eyjólfr dáðaskáld (fl. early 11th c., Iceland, p), "Poet of Deeds"
- Leonora Eyles (1889–1960, England, f/nf)
- Vincent Eyre (1811–1881, England, nf)
- Mansoura Ez-Eldin (born 1976, Egypt, f/nf)
