= Masquerade Festival in Igboland =

Masquerading in Igboland

Masquerades in Igboland
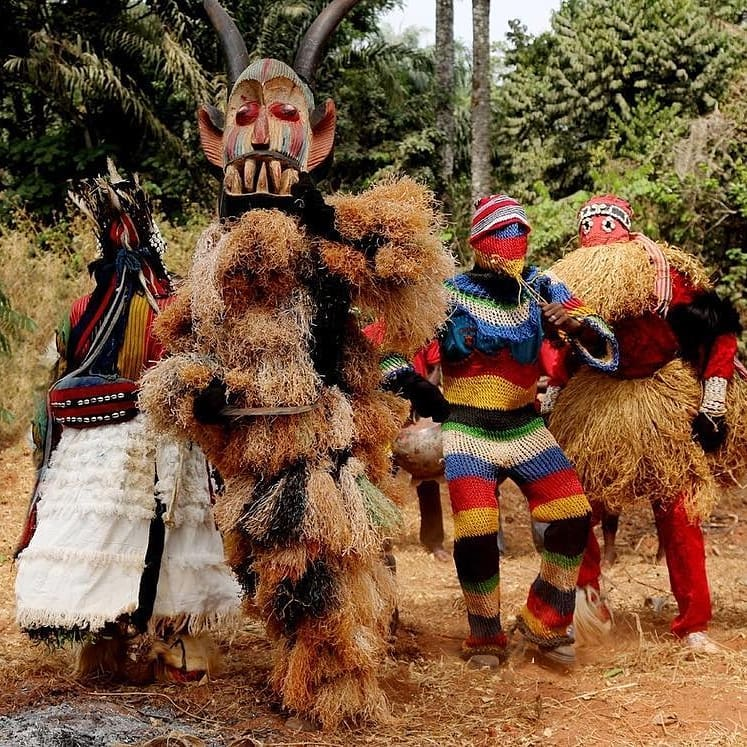
- Location: Igboland
- Country: Nigeria

In Igboland, there are a number of festivities that are celebrated, but among the most important are the masquerade festival and the New Yam Festival.

Those who masquerade are revered as superior beings in Igbo culture. They must be treated with respect when seen in open places because it is thought that they represent both the spirit and human worlds. It is widely believed that they are superior to humans because they emerge from the soil. Only men masquerade, and their identities are kept secret.

== Masquerades ==
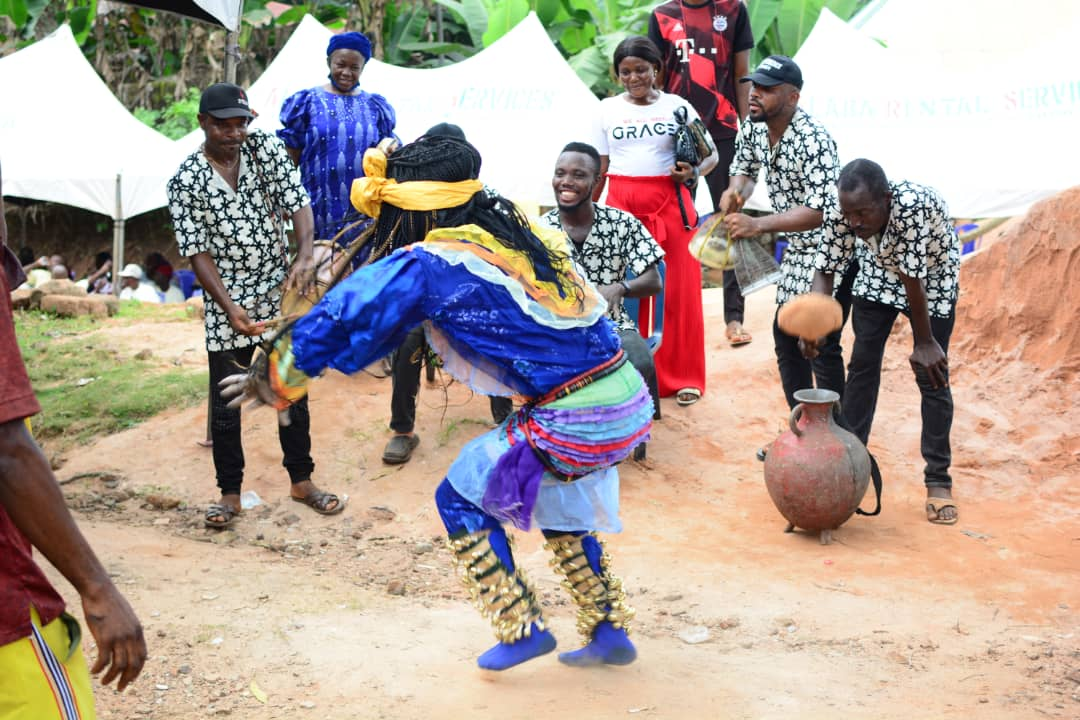
Obollo Burial Masquerade 03

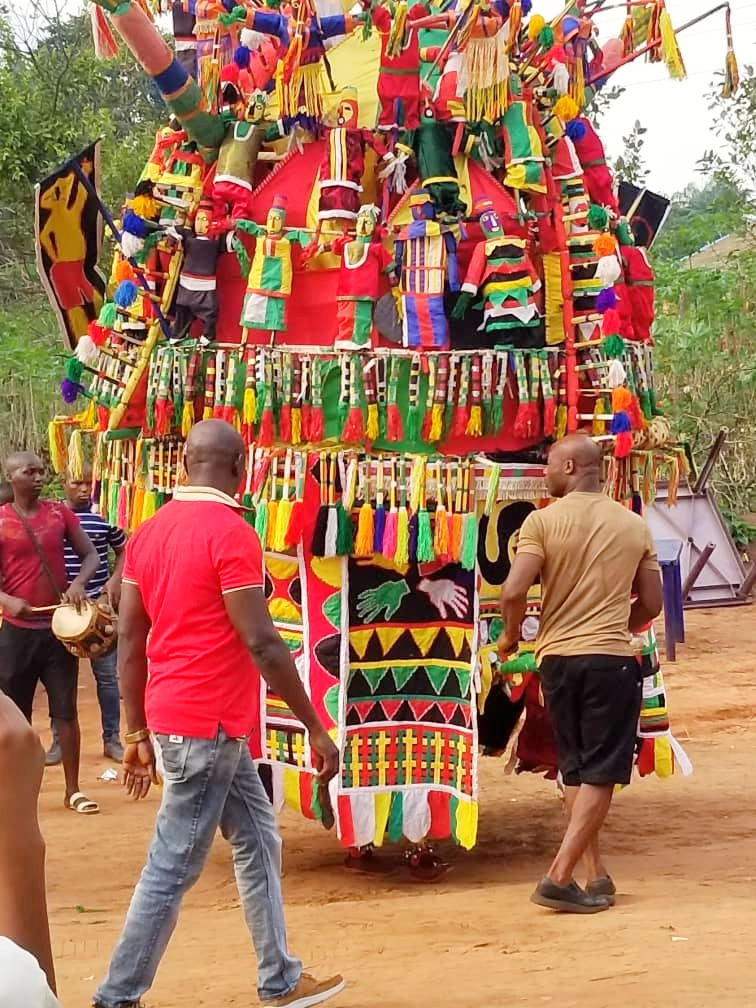
Ijele masquerade from Anambra State

The Adamma masquerade is a contemporary maiden spirit mask worn by men. Adamma, which means 'beautiful woman' and is usually presented to a family's first female child, is the name of the ceremonial masquerade. People frequently question whether the man wearing the mask is indeed a man because she constantly looks stunning in colorful attire and dances so smoothly.

The Mkpamkpanku masquerade has masculine aspects, and is quite stern. It is typically well known in its own right, swift, aggressive, and nimble. It is primarily worn by teens due to its active nature. Two or more powerful men must surround this masquerade at all times, and a rope must be wrapped around its waist to prevent it from overacting.

The Odo masquerade, or Ojionu, is unique to the Agbaja people near Ngwo, in the Enugu state. According to myth and tradition, this masquerade typically symbolizes a deity who permits communication between the living and the dead.

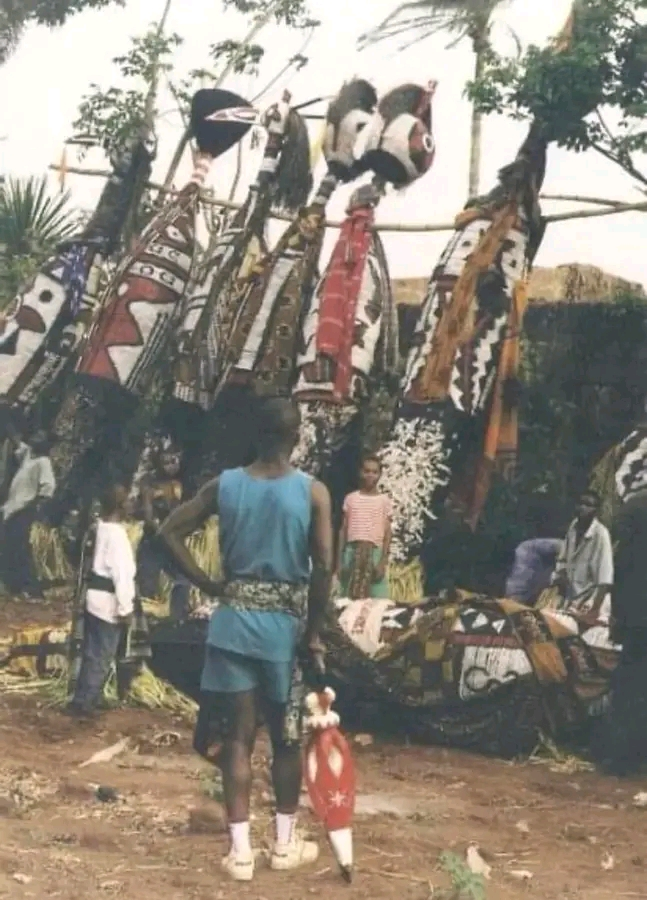
Odo Masquerade

The Ijele masquerade, which originated in the Anambra state, is the largest mask ritual in recorded history. 45 different masqueraders have previously performed on top of Ijele, the king of all masquerades. These 45 masqueraders are currently represented by the statues atop Ijele. It is the pinnacle of all masquerades, and it typically takes place last. Many communities in South-East Nigeria have the Ijele brought to them in order to symbolize fertility and a plentiful harvest. It is also performed at important events like weddings, memorial services, and other celebrations.

The Izaga masquerade, which is the tallest of all Igbo masquerades, is often considered a humorous or show-off masquerade. Both shorter and taller growth is a possibility for them. They only appear at customary rites or festivals to appease the audience.

== Significance ==
Masqueraders played significant roles in maintaining law and order in the past, particularly before the arrival of Christianity. Youth were trained to regard them as sacred. To avoid the wrath of masqueraders, people were obligated to tell the truth at all times. Masqueraders were seen as a way to maintain peace and social order, and served as a form of law enforcement.

Masquerades are typically attended by an entire village during festivals. They serve as entertainment, and combine dance, acrobatics, and other feats to impress locals and visitors. A masquerade may occasionally approach someone to rebuke them for evil acts, especially coveting someone's wife, poisoning others, or other perceived misbehavior.

This may seem outdated, but it successfully imposed corrective measures on would-be social outcasts. As a result, communities' established norms and values were not flouted by individuals with more political or economic influence. Because masqueraders were considered to be spirits, they did not respect individuals. All of society paid attention.
