= E. Nolue Emenanjo =

Nigerian scholar and writer

Prof. E. Nolue Emenanjo
- Born: Emmanuel Nwanolue Emenanjo; April 21, 1943; Katsina, Nigeria
- Died: September 2, 2016 (aged 73)
- Occupations: Academic scholar; writer; university professor and educator

Academic work
- Institutions: University of Port Harcourt
- Main interests: Igbo language and culture

E. Nolue Emenanjo (born Emmanuel Nwanolue Emenanjo; 21 April 1943 – 2 September 2016) was a Nigerian academic scholar, professor, writer and critic who is regarded as a central figure of Igbo literature. His book, A Grammar of Contemporary Igbo: Constituents, Features and Processes (2015), strongly added input to research of Igbo literature and culture. Along with his publications, his Igbo Language and Culture (1975) and Elements of Modern Igbo Grammar (1978). Later books include Auxiliaries in Igbo Syntax (1985) and Multilingualism, Minority Languages, and Language Policy in Nigeria (1990). In the 21st century, Emenanjo is often referred to as the "father of Igbo literature", alongside Tony Ubesie and others.

Born in Katsina State in the northwestern region of Nigeria, to Igbo parents, his early career and childhood was influenced basically on post-colonial Igbo traditional culture. He was birthed in Nigeria and worked in University of Port Harcourt. He relocated to Port Harcourt the capital city of Rivers State in south-south Nigeria after his primary and secondary education, he served as the executive director of the National Institute of Nigerian Languages, Aba and hence, became a professor of linguistics. Known for his critical acclaims of Igbo culture, he would further publish books on Igbo culture and tradition.

Over the years, he has had a multifarious career in publishing, teaching, writing and criticism particularly dealing with the promotion of the Igbo language that he was named alongside other Igbo Language writers like Tony Ubesie. He sought to depict African language and was influenced by Kay Williamson, a British linguist.

== Early life and career ==
Emenanjọ called the first Professor of Igbo language, was from Ụmụeze Igbuzo, Delta state. He was the keynote speaker at the 5th edition of the authors forum held at Kakanfo Conference Centre, Ibadan, Nigeria. After graduating from the University of Ibadan, He proceeded to the University of Port Harcourt in 1983 as a visiting fellow. In 1984, He became a professor of Linguistics as well as heading the department of Linguistics and African Languages.

Afterwards, he became the dean of the Faculty of Humanities for two terms. He left the deanship at his second term for his national service at Warri in Delta state where he served as the provost of the Warri College of Education. He also moved to Aba where he pioneered as the Executive Director of the National Institute For Nigerian Languages, an organisation for fostering Nigerian Languages. In 1988, He started working at Uni Port where he gave his debut inaugural lecture titled; Linguistics, Language and the Nation and was adapted into a book.

== Style ==
=== Writing tradition ===
N'agbanyeghị etu be ha sị dị anya na be ibe ha, Igbo sụọ olundi ha, ibe ha na-aghọta ya.

— BBC Igbo,

The style of Emenanjọ's books was mainly based on Igbo literature expressing the diversity of the people's culture and traditions. He uses Igbo proverbs. Joseph Atubokiki Ajienka, the former vice chancellor of the University of Port Harcourt praised Emenanjo stating, "Any society that has a linguist like Professor Emenanjo, who can develop language and give it depth has something great that it must cherish." Ozo-Mekuri Ndimele, a professor also described him as his supervisor and academic father.

=== Use of English language ===
In his writings, he was diverse about African languages and culture. He said,

I set up the Department of Nigerian Languages for teaching and producing teachers in the languages of the immediate environment—Itsekiri, Urhobo, Isoko and Izon. That Department still survives there. Indeed, I made time to teach some of the linguistic and practical courses at Warri, in Delta State.

Thus, in a valedictory lecture disclosed how working as the Executive Director of the National Institute for Nigerian Languages (NINL), Aba helped him in his field of linguistics;

I had the whole of Nigeria and her languages to practise as a language engineer. Working with native speakers, we developed or systematized the orthographies of many Nigerian languages and got native speakers to write structured and graded school texts in their languages. We also developed curricula and trained manpower for quite a good number of Nigerian languages.

== Writings ==
Books

- —— (1973). Igbo language and culture. Oxford University Press. p. 216. ISBN 9780195752755.
- —— (1978). Elements of modern Igbo grammar: a descriptive approach. Oxford University Press. p. 234. ISBN 9789781540783.
- —— (1985). Auxiliaries in Igbo syntax: a comparative study. Indiana University Linguistics Club. p. 231. OCLC 12769382.
- —— (1990). Multilingualism, minority languages, and language policy in Nigeria. Central Books Limited & Linguistic Association of Nigeria. ISBN 9789782494191.
- —— (1988). Linguistics, Language, and the Nation. Nigeria: University of Port Harcourt. ISBN 9789782321060.
- —— (1989). Atụmatụ Agụmagụ Na Atụmatụ Okwū (in Igbo). Nigeria: Longman Nigeria. ISBN 9789781393372.
- —— (1987). Igbo maka junịọ sekọndịrị 3: akwụkwọ maka ịkụziri ndị kọleji ụtọasụsụ, agụmagụ na omenaala Igbo n'usoro ohụrụ (in Igbo). Nigeria: University Press Limited. p. 256. ISBN 9789781549403.

Co-authored books

- ——; Okolie, O.O.; Ekwe, B.Ụ. (1988). Igbo maka sinịọ sekọndịrị 3. Nigeria: University Press Limited. ISBN 9789781549670.
- ——; Aniche, G.C.O. (1990). Igbò ekèlee (in Igbo). Nigeria: University Press. p. 112. ISBN 9789782490834.
- ——; Bleambo, P.K. (1999). Language Endangerment and Language Empowerment in Nigeria: Theory and Reality. Nigeria: National Institute for Nigerian Languages. ISBN 9789782891020.

Poetry

- —— (1989). Ǹkèḿákọ̄láḿ, akwụkwọ abụ Igbo (in Igbo). Heins Nigeria Publishers, [198-]. ISBN 9789782337092.
