= Nnorom Azuonye =

Nigerian poet (1967–2024)

- Pronunciation: Ig-Nnorom Azuonye.ogg
- Born: 12 July 1967
- Died: 21 January 2024 (aged 56)
- Citizenship: Nigeria
- Education: Government College Umuahia University of Nigeria
- Occupation: theatre manager Playwright Poet

Nnorom Azuonye // (born 12 July 1967, in Biafra – 21 January 2024) was a publisher, theater director, playwright, poet and advertising professional. He was also an accredited Methodist Local Preacher with the Methodist Church in Britain and served as Principal Networker, Global Calvary Network. He wrote Letter To God & Other Poems in 2003, The Bridge Selection: Poems for the Road (2005 & 2012), and Funeral of the Minstrel in 2015). The Founding Publishing Director & Chief Executive Officer, SPM Publications Ltd, Azuonye was the founder and administrator of Sentinel Poetry Movement and the founder and publisher of the magazines Nollywood Focus, Sentinel Literary Quarterly, Sentinel Nigeria and Sentinel Champions.

== Early life and education ==
Nnorom Azuonye, a native of Isuikwuato, Abia State in the southeastern part of Nigeria, was born at Enugu, the capital city of Enugu State in southeastern Nigeria, on 12 July 1967. He was the youngest son of Stephen Onyemaechi Azuonye, MON, MBE, and Hannah Egwuime Azuonye. He attended Government College Umuahia, Capital College, London, and University of Nigeria, Nsukka, where he studied Dramatic Arts.

== Literary activities ==
In 2002, Azuonye founded the Sentinel Poetry Movement - an international community of writers and artists providing an interaction and publishing resource for poetry, fiction, drama, essays, interviews, and reviews of the Arts. He was the Managing Editor of Sentinel Literary Quarterly - a magazine of world literature published by Sentinel Poetry Movement. He was also the publisher of Sentinel Nigeria magazine - an online magazine of contemporary Nigerian writing Sentinel's previous two publications, Sentinel Poetry (Online) and Sentinel Poetry Quarterly, were later merged into the single publication Sentinel Literary Quarterly.

== Writing ==
Azuonye has been widely published internationally in journals, newspapers and anthologies including Agenda, DrumVoices Revue, Eclectica, Orbis, World Haiku Review, Nigerians Talk, African Writing, African Writers, Sketchbook, Poetry Monthly, Opon Ifa, Theatre Forum, Voices Against Racism: 100 Poems Against Racism, and Poems for a Liminal Age (Mandy Pannett ed.).

Books

- Letter to God & Other Poems (2003),
- The Bridge Selection: Poems for the Road (2005 & 2012).
- Blue Hyacinths (2010; ed. with Geoff Stevens),
- Sentinel Annual Literature Anthology (2011; ed with Unoma Azuah and Amanda Sington-Williams),
- Funeral of the Minstrel
- The Genesis of Falcon (ed.) (a play, 2015).

== Family ==
Nnorom was married to Thelma Amaka Azuonye (née Mbomi) in 2006. They lived in London, United Kingdom, with their children Arinzechukwu, Nwachiamanda, Obinna and Ugochukwu.

He is a maternal grandson of Albert Nwosu Igbo – a linguist, writer, and Methodist Church catechist, known as one of the earliest Christian converts in Eastern Nigeria. Nwosu Igbo wrote and translated several indigenous Nigerian languages primarily from the Igbo language, co-authoring the first known primers in Igede and Idoma, and translating early portions of the Books of Acts and Mark into those languages. He also served as President of the Arondizuogu Patriotic Union from 1950 to 1953.
