= Adamma =

Adamma may refer to:

- Adamma (masquerade), an Igbo masquerade
- Adamma (goddess), the Eblaite and Hurrian goddess
