= Okoro Idozuka =

Okoro Idozuka//, born Mazi Okoli Idozuka, was a 19th-century leader and warrior in the Arondizuogu area of what is now Nigeria. He was a senior advisor to the founder of Ndiakunwanta Uno Arondizuogu village and also a leader in his own right, expanding Arondizuogu's boundaries. He was a wealthy slave trader like Izuogu Mgbokpo.

== Life ==
Idozuka was born in the Awka area, but moved to Arondizuogu in the early 19th century. He later changed his birthname, brother Okoli, to its Aro equivalent.

== Hardships ==
About the year 1819, in order to discredit Okoro Idozuka, some people accused him of abduction of some human beings. To salvage his honour, he consented to take the highest oath obtainable in the land in those days. This was the so-called seven big oaths. Here a person was required to swear to the gods on his own head but he had also to join the fate of six other people closest to him to underline his innocence. Should the accused be guilty, the gods would not kill only him but also all those joined in the oath. Mazi Okoli Idozuka's relatives were defined to include those from his immediate household and all male children born in Akunwanta soil. When Mazi Okoro Idozuka was ready to take this big oath, he looked for six more males to join him to make up the required number seven. Unfortunately, he could not find the sixth male person from among members of his immediate household. By this time, Mmelonye, had married Mmaku, a girl from Neni. He rescued Okoro Idozuka from this difficulty by offering that his son, Agosi, just born in his land of immigration be among those to take the oath. Agosi thus became the sixth person to be added for this big oath. Since his accusers were not able to substantiate their allegations, the charges against Okoro Idozuka were dropped.

He is the father of Nwankwo Okoro.

== Legacy ==
Okoro Idozuka is remembered as one of Arondizuogu's greatest leaders and warriors and remains an Aro legend until this day.
