= Igbo literature =

Oral and written works in Igbo language

Igbo literature encompasses both oral and written works of fiction and nonfiction created by the Igbo people in the Igbo language. This literary tradition reflects the cultural heritage, history, and linguistic diversity of the Igbo community. The roots of Igbo literature trace back to ancient oral traditions that included chants, folk songs, narrative poetry, and storytelling. These oral narratives were frequently recited during rituals, childbirth ceremonies, and gatherings. Proverbs and riddles were also used to convey wisdom and entertain children.

The emergence of written Igbo literature can be dated to the late 19th century, coinciding with the arrival of Christian missionaries who published Igbo religious journals and books, contributing to the development of modern Igbo literature. Early works in the Igbo language include History of the Mission of the Evangelical Brothers in the Caribbean (1777) and The Interesting Narrative of the Life of Olaudah Equiano (1789), which incorporated Igbo terms and aspects of Igbo life. Christian missionary societies, such as the Church Missionary Society, played a role in the transition from oral to written literature in Igbo land. Missionaries like Edwin Norris and John Clarke translated and published Igbo vocabularies and grammatical elements.

The "Isuama period," characterised by the use of the Isuama dialect, gave way to the Union Igbo period, which utilised the dialects of Owerri and Umuahia for translations. Notable translations, including the New and Old Testaments, expanded the written Igbo literary canon. Traditional Igbo theatre, often associated with communal festivals and masquerade dramas, presented a unique form of "total theatre." With the colonial era came adaptations of these traditions, incorporating socio-political themes. Contemporary written Igbo theatre and poetry began to flourish after the Nigerian Civil War, serving as a means of political expression and resistance. Writers like Anthony Uchenna Ubesie, and Julie Onwuchekwa played roles in the development of modern Igbo literary works.

== History ==
=== Oral literature ===
During the precolonial era, Igbos practiced oral literature which included chants made by women, folk songs, narrative poetry, and oral storytelling (Igbo: ife) which were folktales. Chants and poetry were sung during rituals and childbirth ceremonies. These chants, although sometimes rare, were accompanied by horn players.

Oral storytelling is categorised into three categories: tales with songs, tales without songs, and tales sung without prose. Oral storytelling was told to children by young adults and most times by mothers when household chores were done. Oral storytelling was often told at night, particularly by moonlight, serving as a form of education for children. These oral types of storytelling may be recited by individuals or groups of people, sometimes accompanied by singing and musical accompaniments. Proverbs were an integral part of the life of the Igbo people and were perpetually on the lips of the elders, reflecting their wisdom and experiences. Riddles served as a form of entertainment for children, testing their wit and cultural knowledge.

=== Written literature ===
Before the arrival of Europeans, the Igbo people had a form of writing known as Nsịbịdị, which was prevalent among the Igbo in Aro, Cross River, and neighbouring regions. Additionally, other indigenous systems, such as uli among the Ngwa people, Akwụkwọ mmụọ in parts of Okigwe, and the Aniocha writing system in western Igboland, served as means of communication and artistic expression. The introduction of Western education and Christian teachings led to a decline in the use of Nsibidi.

The first documented publication containing Igbo terms was the book History of the Mission of the Evangelical Brothers in the Caribbean (German: Geschichte der Mission der Evangelischen Brüder auf den Carabischen Inseln) by G.C.A. Oldendorp, published in 1777. Oldendorp spoke to the African slaves on the islands and recorded vocabulary for 28 African languages, including two forms of Igbo, Ibo and Karabari. In 1789, The Interesting Narrative of the Life of Olaudah Equiano was published in London by Olaudah Equiano, a former slave, and it included 79 Igbo words, along with detailed descriptions of Igbo life based on Equiano's experiences in Essaka. In 1837, during the Niger Expedition of 1832–1834, Scottish merchant Macgregor Laird published a wordbook compiled from the Igbo homeland.

The transition from oral to written literature in Igbo land was influenced by the Church Missionary Society. Following the Niger Expedition of 1841, Edwin Norris and James Schön, accompanied by Samuel Ajayi Crowther and Igbo interpreters, John Christopher Taylor and Simon Jonas, attempted to communicate with the Igbos using an Igbo vocabulary of 1600 words. However, communication difficulties led Schön to shift his efforts to the Hausa-speaking region.

John Clarke and Joseph Merrick jointly published Specimens Of Dialects, Short Vocabularies Of Languages: And Notes Of Countries And Customs In Africa, which included approximately 250 Igbo words. In 1854, Sigismund Koelle published Polyglotta Africana, featuring 300 Igbo words in five different dialects. In the same year, William Balfour Baikie included a short Igbo vocabulary in his work, Narrative of an Exploring Voyage up the Rivers Kwora and Binue.

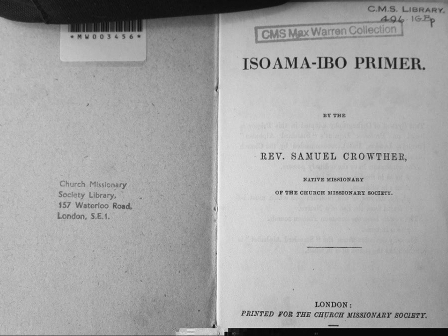
Isuama Ibo Primer by Samuel Ajayi Crowther published in 1857

Following the British Niger Expeditions of 1854 and 1857, Samuel Ajayi Crowther produced a primer for the Igbo language in 1857, written in the Isuama dialect. A revised edition of Crowther's primer was published in 1859 by John Christopher Taylor, who had established a school in Onitsha with Simon Jonas. This primer served as a textbook for the school. In 1861, James Schön, in collaboration with Taylor, published Oku Ibo: Grammatical Elements of Ibo Language. In Grammatical Elements Schön criticised the translations made by Taylor for failing to include folktales and native proverbs. In 1869, Taylor published Igbo proverbs as an appendix to The Gospel on the Banks of the Niger, a journal he co-edited with Crowther. Shortly afterwards, he withdrew from the Niger Mission due to a heated Taylor-Schön debacle. Subsequently, in 1870, W. F. Smart, a catechist in Isuama, authored a primer based on Taylor's work.

In 1881, Samuel Ajayi Crowther compiled the Vocabulary of the Ibo Language, the first comprehensive Igbo dictionary, which was later revised and expanded jointly by Crowther and Schön in 1883 as Vocabulary of the Ibo Language, Part II, an English-Igbo dictionary. The enactment of the first education ordinance in 1882 had a temporary impact on the development of West African languages, resulting in a hiatus in Igbo language publications until 1892. In that year, Julius Spencer, a Sierra Leonean missionary based in Onitsha, published An Elementary Grammar of the Igbo Language.

In 1913, the translation of the New Testament and Old Testament into Igbo by Thomas John Dennis and a group of translators marked the end of the "Isuama period," which used the Isuama dialect, and the beginning of the "Union Igbo period," which used the dialects of Owerri and Umuahia. Dennis continued to be acclaimed for his translations and literary contributions until his death in 1917. Notable translations were made during this period, including Pilgrim's Progress, translated to Ije Nke Onye Kraịst, and Dick Udensi Ogan's translation of Grimms' Fairy Tales into Akụkọ Ifo Grim Kọrọ.

In 1923, Israel E. Iwekanuno published Akuko Ala Obosi, a 262-page history book narrating the history of Obosi town. This was followed by the publication of the first Igbo fiction novel, Omenuko, authored by Pita Nwana in 1932 and published in 1933 by Longman, Green and Co. In 1963, a transliterated edition of Omenuko by J. O. Iroaganachi, referred to as the "Official Orthography Edition," was published by Longman Nigeria. Omenuko is considered a foundational work in Igbo literature. Shortly after the publication of Omenuko, Ala Bingo by D. N. Achara was published in 1937.

Starting from 1941, following a report by Ida C. Ward, the "Union Igbo period" came to an end, and the "Central Igbo period" began. This period witnessed the establishment of magazines such as Amamihe, the publication of guidebooks, and the translation of major European classic literature. However, there was a limited output of indigenous fiction during this period, with most works and translations sponsored or published by the government or Christian missionaries. In 1963, the second major Igbo fiction novel, Ije Odumodu Jere by Leopold Bell-Gam, was published. It was transliterated from the Lepsius orthography into Central Igbo for publication. However, literature like Bell-Gam's remained limited due to the multiplicity of the new standard orthography.

Following the outbreak of the Nigerian Civil War, literary activities were temporarily suspended, leading to the emergence of the Standard Igbo period after the war.

== Traditional and modern theatre ==
Igbo traditional arts in the precolonial era have been acknowledged by scholars as encompassing what they term "total theatre". Traditional Igbo theatre includes the Igbo masquerade drama, which originated from ancestral worship.

Precolonial Igbo theatre primarily conveyed its messages visually, relying on music, dance, and symbolism. It was deeply integrated into festivals and ceremonies, often performed by amateurs rather than professionals, as is the case with modern theatre.

Traditional Igbo theatre includes the Odo and Aba Ugwu performances among the Nsukka and Udi people, the Okumkpa theater in Afikpo, and the Owu and Ikoro festivals of the Ngwa people.

The introduction of colonial rule brought about changes to these festivals, societies, and ceremonies. Traditional theatre adapted to a new socio-political environment as a means of preserving its essence. Plays and dramas addressing issues of tyranny began to emerge in places like Okpatu and Ngwa land, particularly during periods when secret societies were suppressed.

Contemporary written Igbo theatre emerged in 1974 with the publication of Udo Ka Mma by Anelechi B. Chukuezi. However, it's worth noting that Igbo written plays have a limited readership. To address this, plays have been made compulsory for students at the secondary and university levels.

== Traditional and modern poetry ==
Early Igbo poetry were transmitted orally from one generation to another. Each generation had artists who contributed new poems to the society, but the names of these poets are lost due to lack of orthographic documentation. Prior to "Western civilisation, the poetry of the Igbo was well developed, and it also served the sociological needs of the people."

Igbo poetry is classified into two parts: panegyric and elegiac poetry. Panegyric poetry is seen during childbirth, love poems and rituals while elegiac poetry can be seen in times of war, burials and satirical poems.

One of the earliest attempts at writing Igbo poetry were made by the Church Missionary Society in 1934 with the translation of the Book of Common Prayer into Akwụkwọ Ekpelu nke Anekpelu Cuku n'Ogbo. The translations accepted hymns written by native Igbo's and were branded as "original". This attempt, however, is dismissed by scholars since the attempt was made solely for to gain native converts.

Contemporary Igbo poetry grew stronger during and after the Nigerian civil war. Poetry served as an expression of political resistance and campaigns for good governance. Joseph C. Maduekwe, a Nigerian writer who worked at the radio station of the Biafrian army presented chants known as Onyekulum on behalf of an Igbo masquerade called Ayaka in order to boost the morale of the Biafrian soldiers in the frontline and deteriorating civilians. The manuscript used by Maduekwe was never published and thus is considered as oral poetry.

In 1971, Romanus N. Egudu and Donatus Nwoga published the first transcribed oral Igbo poetic text Poetic Heritage, the anthology is however not considered to be a written Igbo poetry because it was written in English and they were not originally written by Egudu and Nwoga.

The first written Igbo poetry Akpa Uche was published in 1975 by Oxford University Press and edited by Romanus M. Ekechukwu. The anthology featured 65 poems from 13 poets and was instrumental in the publication of subsequent anthologies and poems. It also "became epicentre of poetic teaching and discourse in academic institutions where the study of Igbo poetry already started with the study of transcribed oral texts." From 1975 to 2015, there have a total of 52 anthologies of written Igbo poetry.

== Notable Igbo writers ==
Tony Ubesie succeeded in one aspect: proving to the Igbo man that a good novel is a possibility in Igbo. That has not only created a wide readership for Igbo Literature but also encouraged other authors to try their hands in writing in Igbo.

— Ernest Emenyonu, The Literary History of the Igbo Novel, p.116

The list of Igbo literary authors with works written in Igbo includes both established and emerging male and female writers:

Anthony Uchenna Ubesie (22 February 1950 — 11 February 1994) was an Igbo-language novelist, poet, playwright. Ubesie published series of novels from 1973 till his death. His novels include Ukwa Ruo Oge Ya Ọ Daa (1973) Isi Akwu Dara Nala (1973), Mmiri Oku Eji Egbu Mbe (1974), Ụkpana Okpoko Buuru (1975), Jụọ Obinna (1977).

Julie Onwuchekwa (b. 1944) is an Igbo-language novelist whose novel Chinagọrọm was the first novel that has been described as a kick against patriarchy in Igbo.

Ude Odilora is a Nigerian secondary teacher who wrote Okpa Aku Eri Eri in 1981. Odilora's novel is read in educational institutions and by "the general reader in Eastern Nigeria." Its theme is the struggle for material wealth in Nigerian society.

Chief Frederick Chidozie Ogbalu (1927–1990) was a Nigerian writer and educator known predominantly known for standardising the Igbo language through his Society for Promoting Igbo Language and Culture. Ogbalu in his lifetime published essays, guidebooks and novels in Igbo language. Through his publishing company, he helped publish most Igbo-language novels.

== See also ==
- Igbo culture
