= Iheme =

Chief Iheme of Isi-Akpu Nise near Awka was a chief apprentice of Maazi Izuogu Mgbokpo. He helped defeat the Ikpa Ora people and was one of the founding fathers of Arondizuogu. His people later migrated to the kingdom.
