= Igwegbe Odum =

Eze Igwegbe Odum (sometimes called Chief Igwebe Odum) was an Aro Igbo politician born in the Nigerian town of Mbaukwu in present-day Awka South LGA in Anambra state. Igwegbe Odum, was not Aro by origin, but a migrant like many settlers in Arondizuogu. Along with his brothers, he fled to Arondizuogu in the late 19th century. His life story became the subject of Omenuko the earliest Igbo novel written by Pita Nwana. Odum died in 1940. He was also a brother-in-law to Ojiako Ezenne of Adazi. Igwegbe Odum never made it back to his homeland of Mbaukwu. Along with his brothers, he settled in Ndi-Aniche Uno in Arondizuogu. Their lineage include the legendary K.O. Mbadiwe and his brother Green Mbadiwe.
