= Ebe, Enugu State =

Town in Enugu, Nigeria

Coordinates: 6°29′03″N 7°22′53″E

Ebe is a town in Udi local government of Enugu State, Nigeria. Ebe is named after the first of the eight sons of Ojebe Ogene, others sons includes, Abor, Awhum, Okpatu, Umulumgbe, Ukana, Umuoka and Ukehe. According to local oral tradition, Ebe was the initial settlement, and as the family grew, subsequent generations moved out to establish seven more new towns named after members of the family.

== Geography ==
Ebe borders the towns of Ngwo, Egede, Abor, and Eke.

== Governance ==
=== Traditional ruler ===
HRH Igwe Cyril Ogbozor is the current ruler of Ebe community.

== Festival ==
=== Odo Festival ===
Every two years the seven villages in Ebe come together with various groups of odo masquerade to celebrate the Odo Festival.

== Villages ==
There are seven villages in the Ebe rural area:

- Adukwu
- Amagu
- Eziania
- Omadi
- Omadi-Uwenu
- Umavulu
- Umuezike

== Notable people ==
- Obinna Nwobodo, professional footballer
