= Pericoma Okoye =

Nigerian singer and sorcerer

Background information
- Also known as: Lion of Africa; Arusi Makaja 1; Mezuo Mbụ nke Arọndizuogu
- Born: Pericoma Mezuo Okoye; 1948
- Origin: Arondizuogu, Imo, Nigeria
- Died: February 16, 2017 (aged 68–69) Okigwe, Imo, Nigeria
- Genres: Igbo masquerade music
- Occupations: Singer, songwriter

Pericomo Damian Azubike Nwankwo Okoye (1948 – February 16, 2017), known as Pericoma, was a Nigerian singer, songwriter and traditionist. In addition to his music, he was known as a practitioner of Odinala, the traditional religion of the Igbo people.

== Life and career ==
Okoye was born in 1948 in Arondizuogu in Imo State. He was a singer-songwriter in the Igbo masquerade tradition. His music was described as "oral rendition of rarefied Igbo history". He first became known in the early 1970s, when he sang in the choir of St. Michael's Catholic church in Arondizuogu and then became lead vocalist of Troupe, a cultural music group. After releasing an album with them, he left to form his own group and starting in 1976, released yearly albums. He created more than 200 songs.

Okoye was cultural prime minister of Arondizuogu until his death and was known as Mezuo Mbụ nke Arọndizuogu ('first of Arondizuogu') and Arụsị Makaja Mbụ ('first Makaji Arusi') or Arusi Makaja 1. After appearing with Pete Edochie in a Nollywood movie titled Lion of Africa, he also came to be called by that name.

== Traditional practitioner ==
Okoye was also known as a practitioner of traditional Igbo religion and magic, Odinala. An article by a theologian contrasted him in this respect with Oliver de Coque, noting Okoye's praise for "herbalists and those deemed capable of making contact with and manipulating the world of the spirits". His magic performances drew large audiences to the Ikeji festival in Arondizuogu. The best known tale of his magical exploits, recounted by Anaede Unu in a song titled "Pericoma na-anyi ajo aro", was when he foiled a gang of extortionist "agbero boys" in Onitsha who demanded his tax receipts: when he ignored them, one of them attempted to carry him off on his shoulders, but he reportedly made himself extremely heavy and prevented the man from lowering him for several hours, until the group performed the propitiatory rituals to his deity that he specified.

== Honours ==
In July 2010, Okoye received the Distinguished Achievement Award of the Mbari Literary Society in Owerri for his contribution to the growth and preservation of Igbo language and culture.

== Personal life and death ==
Okoye had several wives and many children, including Omor Perry, his eldest son, Ebube Izuogu, who is also a traditional singer, and Fenfe Pericoma Johnbosco. Darlington Okoye, a Nigerian rapper who performs under the name Speed Darlington, said in July 2017 that Pericoma Okoye was also his father.

He died on February 16, 2017, in a hospital in Okigwe. Final interment in the village of Ndiogbuonyeoma, Ndibeuche was scheduled for April 9, 2018.

== Selected discography ==
- Ejezuo
- Isi na udoh ga-adi (2 volumes)
- Ekere Mgba
- High Tension
- Ikeji Izuogu
- Ute Nti
- Aja Egbu edi
- Irigworugwo
- Obodo Aghoka
- Igatakwuteya Aja
- Izu Ka Mma Na Nne Ji
- Nduka Aku
- Oderigwugwu
- Ogbaghara
- Awirigidi
- Zuzugboizugbo zugbo
