= Ohum =

Town in Enugu State, Nigeria

Ohum, (officially spelled Awhum), is a valley town in Enugu State, in southeastern Nigeria.

== Geography ==
The town is located about 24 kilometres (15 mi) from Enugu (Coal City) the state capital. The town is bounded in the north by Okpatu, in the east by Nike, in the south by Ukana and in the west by Egede communities.

The town is divided into eight villages: Isiogwu, Amani/Ama-abo, Ibite Uwaenu, Umuoka, Obeagu/Amachara, Akparata/Amaudara, Amaofia-ni-Ibite. Ibite has two villages and Enu ohum has three villages, while the others are on their own.

The town has a population of about 100,000 according to the 2006 Census.

Ohum is a popular tourist and pilgrimage destination, attracting visitors with its waterfalls, caves beautiful streams and an active monastery, the first in Nigeria.

== History ==
Humans have been known to inhabit the area for thousands of years. Awhum−Ohum is believed to have been the fourth child of Ojebe Ogene, who also has seven other children, Ebe, Abor, Ukana, Okpatu, Umulugbe, Umuoka and Ukehe(Now in Nsukka region).

== Governance ==
The town is governed largely by the Igwe in council with his chiefs (from the eight villages) and there is the Central Union which is a kind of parliament that decides the general direction and developmental needs. An election is held to elect members into the union and into the Igwe's stool when it becomes vacant. A constitution was drawn up on the various aspects of community life including election into various offices. The 'Igweship' is held for life.

== Economy ==
The major economy of Ohum was farming and hunting. There is a local market (Nkwo Market) that serves the community. The market is situated at Ukwu Akpu and seems to be in the centre of the town. The Nkwo and Orie are the major market days and the trading is usually done in the evening after sun down. Things have changed in recent years with the market trading daily all through the day. The town is known for producing high quality palm wine (wine from the palm tree). The establishment of the monastery changed all that. Tourism and pilgrimage to the monastery is now the major source of income for the community. The indigenes of the community living outside the community also remit monies home which is a significant amount each year. There is a hotel that serves some of the tourists that visits the town. Tourism and pilgrimage are now one of the major drivers of economic growth in the community. The waterfall, beautiful hills with erosion scarred valleys and the monastery bring tens of thousand of people each year to the community.

== Education ==
The community is served by three primary schools and a secondary school. All the schools are government owned schools.

== Religion ==
The main religion practiced in Ohum is Christianity. Practitioners of Traditional religion are also in the community. There are Catholic and Anglican churches in the community. There is a monastery of the Cistercian Monks in town, which is now a major pilgrimage and prayer centre for Christians in Nigeria.

== Transportation ==
The community is divided into three unequal parts by two major highways in an east–west way. . The first, Enugu – Nsukka highway was built in 1914 and the Enugu – Markurdi expressway in 1981 all in North – South direction. The major form of movement within the town is by commercial motorcycles.

== Tourism ==
The town of Ohum is in a valley and bounded on all sides by beautiful rolling hills covered in grass. There is a waterfall (Awhum falls), about 30 meters in height and several caves lining the track to the waterfall. The track itself is actually a small stream with big rocks overhanging in some places along the track.

The community also boast numerous pristine lakes, some of them with beautiful white sand beaches. The numerous streams and lakes are still maintained in their natural conditions. More than 50 different species of fish are found in the streams and lakes of the community and some of the lakes have never been fished on before.

== See also ==
- Populated places in Enugu State
- Coordinates of Ohum
  - Longitude: 7° 25' 0" East
  - Latitude: 6° 32' 0" North
