= Speed Darlington =

Nigerian singer, rapper, songwriter

Darlington Okoye
- Born: Darlington Okoye; March 13, 1984 (age 42)
- Other names: Speed Darlington; Scorpion King; Akpi
- Occupations: Musician; songwriter; social media personality
- Years active: 2017–present

Darlington Okoye (born; March 13, 1984) popularly known as Speed Darlington, is a Nigerian rapper. He was born in Bronx, New York, USA, to musicians Pericoma Okoye and Queen Achakpo. Darlington was raised in the Bronx, New York, and began his journey in the arts as a dancer in the 1990s. His shift to music came in 2017 with the release of his single "Bangdadadang!" His style blends Afrobeat, pop, and rap. Over the years, he has released several other tracks, including "Akamu," "Cash & Carry," "Ogiriga Owuwa" and "Baby Oil".

== Controversies ==
Darlington's fame has been fueled as much by his controversial persona as by his music. His social media presence is marked by provocative and often erratic behavior, sparking numerous public disputes.

One notable incident occurred during an Instagram live video in January 2022, where Darlington brandished a knife after being accused by a woman of being a rapist. The altercation caused an uproar online, with widespread criticism of his conduct. In another instance, Darlington stirred controversy by making statements about turning to cybercrime if his music career failed, a comment that was widely condemned for promoting negative stereotypes about Nigerians.

He has also engaged in several public feuds with Nigerian celebrities, including Wizkid and Tunde Ednut. In one case, he threatened Ednut with "juju" (traditional charms) during a disagreement over social media influence. Furthermore, Darlington has faced backlash for his disparaging remarks about Nigerian women, including comments about women from Benin, which many deemed misogynistic.

Okoye, has had a number of controversies, including a notable incident involving Burna Boy. In October 2024, Speed Darlington was arrested and held in police custody after Burna Boy filed a defamation complaint against him. The controversy arose after Speed Darlington questioned the legitimacy of Burna Boy's Grammy win for Twice As Tall, insinuating that Burna Boy's association with Sean "Diddy" Combs, who was facing serious legal issues at the time, might have influenced the award. This led to accusations of cyberstalking and defamation from Burna Boy's camp, prompting legal action.

Speed Darlington was eventually released on bail after the intervention of human rights lawyer Deji Adeyanju, but the controversy stirred widespread debate about freedom of speech in the Nigerian entertainment industry. Additionally, old videos resurfaced where Speed Darlington had previously used harsh language against Burna Boy, further inflaming tensions.
