= Ikeji festival =

Festival observed annually by the Igbo people of Nigeria

- Language: Igbo

Origin
- Meaning: Local Wrestling
- Region of origin: Eastern Region, Nigeria

The Ikeji festival// is an annual four-day festival held by the Igbo people of Arondizuogu, in Imo state, Nigeria, between the months of March and April to celebrate the harvest of new yams and the Igbo culture. It is arguably the largest masquerade parade in West Africa. The inception of the Ikeji festival dates back five centuries and is an Igbo festival which unites all Igbo race across the globe as they return to the south-eastern regions of Nigeria to witness and partake in the festival. The festival is marked with the display of numerous masquerades dancing around the villages, music, and practice of the Igbo traditional religion.

== History ==
There are two theories as to the history of the Ikeji festival, but the generally accepted theory propounded by the people of Arondizuogu claimed the first Ikeji festival took place in the 16th century and its purpose then was to solely appreciate the gods of the land for providing them with a bountiful harvest of new yams.

== Economic significance ==
The Ikeji festival serves as a source of revenue for Nigeria through tourism as foreigners as well all the Igbos in diaspora travel back to Arondizuogu to witness the festival.

== Ito-Ebule ==
The Ikeji festival is marked by various activities; the most popular is a competition named Ito-Ebule, which translates to “Untying of the ram”. It is the most anticipated activity and is held on the last day of the Ikeji festival. The Ito-Ebule is characterized by the display of occult powers by various self-proclaimed sorcerers who have come from all regions to willingly partake in the Ito-Ebule competition. During the Ito-Ebule competition, a ram is tied to a tree and sorcerers who have entered the competition are asked to go and untie the ram. According to the tradition of Arondizuogu, only the most powerful sorcerer amongst them all could successfully untie the ram.

Coincidentally, the most successful sorcerer, who had won the Ito-Ebule contests numerous times by successfully untying the ram annually, was the traditional prime minister of Arondizuogu named Pericoma Okoye.

== In media ==
The Ikeji festival is shown in a Nigerian Nollywood movie titled Lion of Africa.
