= Ude Odilora =

Nigerian writer

Udekwesiri Odilora was a Nigerian novelist and secondary school teacher. He was the author of Oka Aku Eri Eri, considered one of the foremost novels in Igbo literature.

== Life and career ==
Odilora was born in Umunachi in Dunukofia local government area of Anambra state. He studied French at the University of Nigeria, Nsukka. He was a secondary school teacher by profession until retirement.
