= Ngwo Pine forest =

Pine Forest in Nigeria

Ngwo Pine forest Ngwo Forest
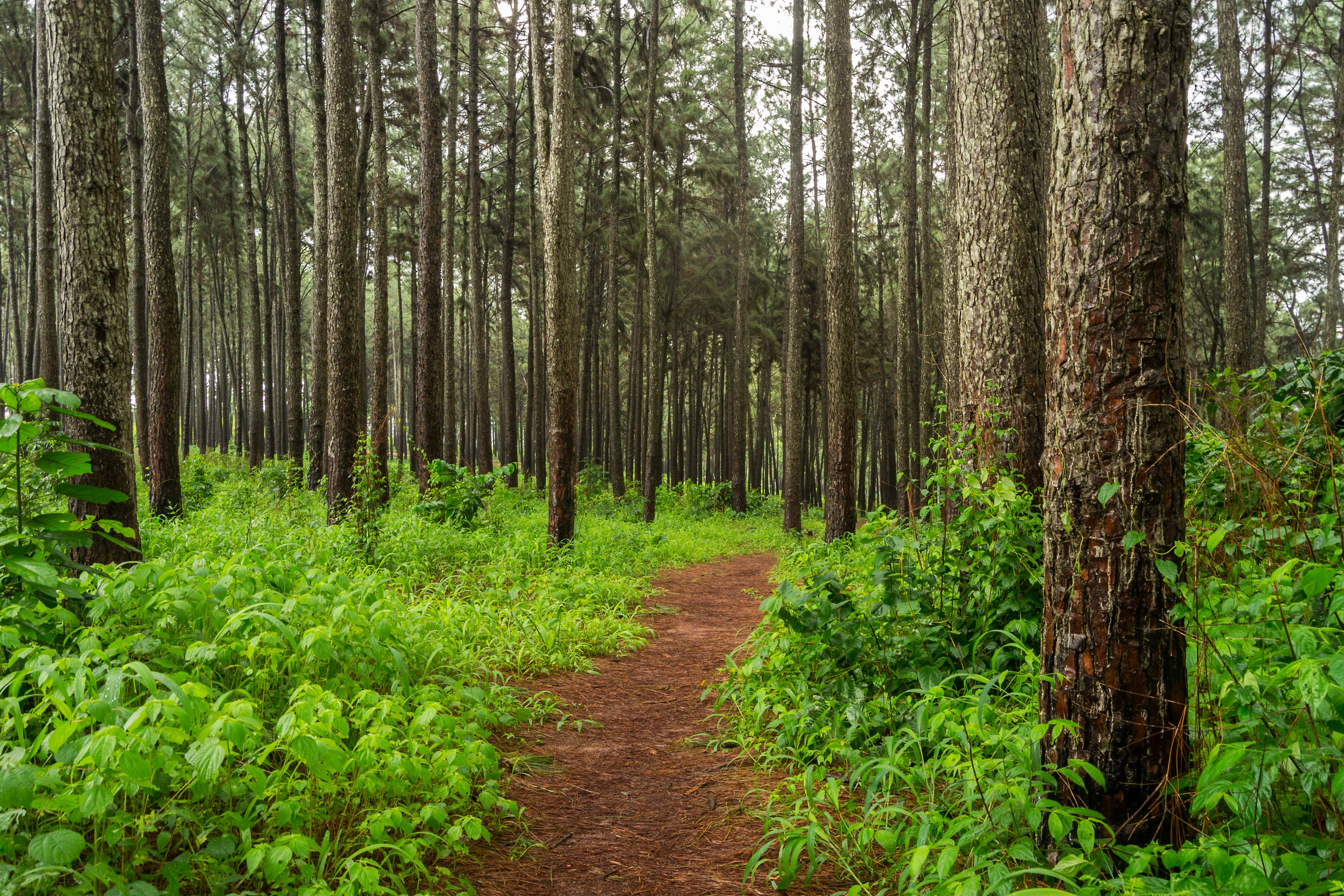
- Ngwo pine forest, Ngwo, Enugu state, Nigeria
- Interactive map of Ngwo Pine forest

Geography
- Coordinates: 6.4294°N 7.4414°E

The Ngwo Pine Forest is a pine forest located in Ngwo, Enugu, Nigeria. The forest is a large stretch of land with tall pine trees. It features a limestone cave and a waterfall, and is used as a recreational area, bolstering the socioeconomic development in the Enugu State.

== History ==
The Ngwo Pine Forest Formation (NPFF) is a patch of montane rainforest and cloud forest on the Ngwo Hills in Igboland (South-East Nigeria). It is located at the southernmost extent of the Afromontane Forest ecoregion and is one of the most diverse forests in Africa.

In the early 20th century, the British Colonial Government established a forest reserve in the NPFF. This reserve was intended to provide protection from deforestation and to ensure a sustainable supply of timber. However, even with these efforts to create an alternative supply of timber, the NPFF has continued to lose a significant amount of forest land over the last 50 years due to agricultural expansion, logging, and mining. Today, the NPFF is still a relatively intact forest, but is under threat from a number of factors, including deforestation, climate change, and invasive species.

The Ngwo Pine Forest hosts pilgrimages and educational activities, supporting the tourism industry in Enugu State.

== Climate ==
The Ngwo Pine Forest has a tropical climate with distinct wet and dry seasons, categorized as Aw (dry winter) according to the Köppen-Geiger classification. Situated near the equator, the region encounters difficulty in defining its summers due to consistent warmth throughout the year. The annual average temperature is around 25.9 °C (78.6 °F), maintaining a relatively warm and consistent climate.

However, there is notable seasonal variation in precipitation patterns, with summers being considerably rainier than winters. The Ngwo Pine Forest features an average precipitation of 154.6 centimetres (60.9 in). The month of January stands out as the driest, witnessing on average a mere 0 centimetres (0 in) of rainfall. In contrast, August and September are very wet months, experiencing an average precipitation of 25 centimetres (9.8 in).

Temperature fluctuations throughout the year range from a maximum average of 28 °C (82 °F) in February and March, to a minimum average of 23.9 °C (75.0 °F) in July. This temperature variability is relatively modest, with an annual range of 25.9 °C (78.6 °F). The mean daily maximum for the year is 30.6 °C (87.1 °F), while the mean daily minimum for the year is 22.6 °C (72.7 °F).

Relative humidity follows a seasonal trend; June, July, September, and October all share the highest relative humidity at 85%, while January records the lowest at 41%. These data statistics match the ones about rainfall, with January and September being notable outliers. July, August, and September have the highest average number of rainy days at 20, whereas December experiences only 1 rainy day on average.

The Forest Reserve's sunshine hours contribute to the overall climate experience. January enjoys the most daily sunshine hours, with a mean of 8.8 hours. In contrast, September experiences the least daily sunshine hours, averaging around 4.4 hours. Ngwo Forest Reserve enjoys an average of 6 sunshine hours per day throughout a year.

Climate data for Ngwo Pine Forest (Ngwo-Uno)
Month	Jan	Feb	Mar	Apr	May	Jun	Jul	Aug	Sep	Oct	Nov	Dec	Year
Mean daily maximum °C (°F)	34.2 (93.5)	34 (94)	33.4 (92.1)	31.6 (88.8)	29.9 (85.9)	28.4 (83.2)	27.7 (81.8)	27.6 (81.6)	28.2 (82.7)	28.8 (83.9)	30.3 (86.6)	32.8 (91.1)	30.6 (87.1)
Daily mean °C (°F)	27.8 (82.1)	28 (83)	28 (82)	26.8 (80.3)	25.8 (78.4)	24.6 (76.3)	23.9 (75.1)	24 (75)	24.2 (75.5)	24.7 (76.5)	25.8 (78.5)	27.0 (80.6)	25.9 (78.6)
Mean daily minimum °C (°F)	22 (72)	23.4 (74.1)	24.0 (75.2)	23.8 (74.8)	23.2 (73.7)	22.3 (72.1)	21.8 (71.2)	22 (71)	21.8 (71.3)	22 (72)	22.6 (72.6)	22.0 (71.6)	22.6 (72.6)
Average precipitation cm (inches)	0 (0)	0 (0)	5.1 (2)	13 (5)	18 (7)	23 (9)	23 (9)	25 (10)	25 (10)	20 (8)	2.5 (1)	0 (0)	154.6 (61)
Average rainy days	2	3	7	12	18	19	20	20	20	19	7	1	148
Average relative humidity (%)	41	52	67	76	82	85	85	84	85	85	76	52	73
Mean daily sunshine hours	8.8	8.0	7.0	5.9	5.1	4.6	4.6	4.5	4.4	4.6	6.1	8.4	6.0
Source: climate-data.org

== Economic activities ==
Agriculture plays a vital role in the economic sustenance of the forest area. The land surrounding the forest is often utilized for agricultural purposes. Local communities undertake cultivation, with crops like pineapples and other fruits. These agricultural activities serve as a means of livelihood for the residents.

Forestry also features prominently in the economic landscape of the Ngwo Pine Forest. Sustainable forest management practices are implemented, including timber harvesting, collection of non-timber forest products, and reforestation efforts. These practices aim to strike a balance between economic needs and environmental conservation.

Furthermore, the local artisan community engages in the creation and sale of handcrafted products, utilizing materials sourced from the forest. This might encompass wood carvings and traditional handicrafts, thereby contributing to the local economy.

The Igbos living in the Ngwo region consider the raffia palm, an economic crop used for consumption, as sacred. Alongside its utility in food, it is also used for decoration, rituals, and the construction of beams and roof coverings. The sap is fermented into raffia wine, the leaves are used for coronation, and the palm's fiber may be used in textiles, baskets, and fishing poles. Finally, the tree itself is used to make the ofo staff for cursing or blessing people, in accordance with the Igbo people's superstitions.

In addition to these activities, some residents participate in small-scale livestock farming, rearing animals such as goats, poultry, or cows as part of their economic pursuits.

== Ngwo Cave and Waterfall ==
Ngwo Cave and Waterfall is a natural attraction located in the Ngwo Pine Forest in Enugu State, Nigeria. The cave is formed from limestone and has a waterfall flowing from an opening in its roof. The waterfall forms a shallow pool on the cave floor and flows out as a small stream.

It is a popular tourist destination for both Nigerians and international visitors. It also has cultural significance for the Igbo people of Nigeria. The cave is seen as a sacred place and is home to a number of important cultural sites, including shrines and burial sites.

There are a number of threats to the Ngwo Cave and Waterfall, including deforestation, pollution, and overtourism.
