= Mbonu Ojike =

Nigerian nationalist and writer

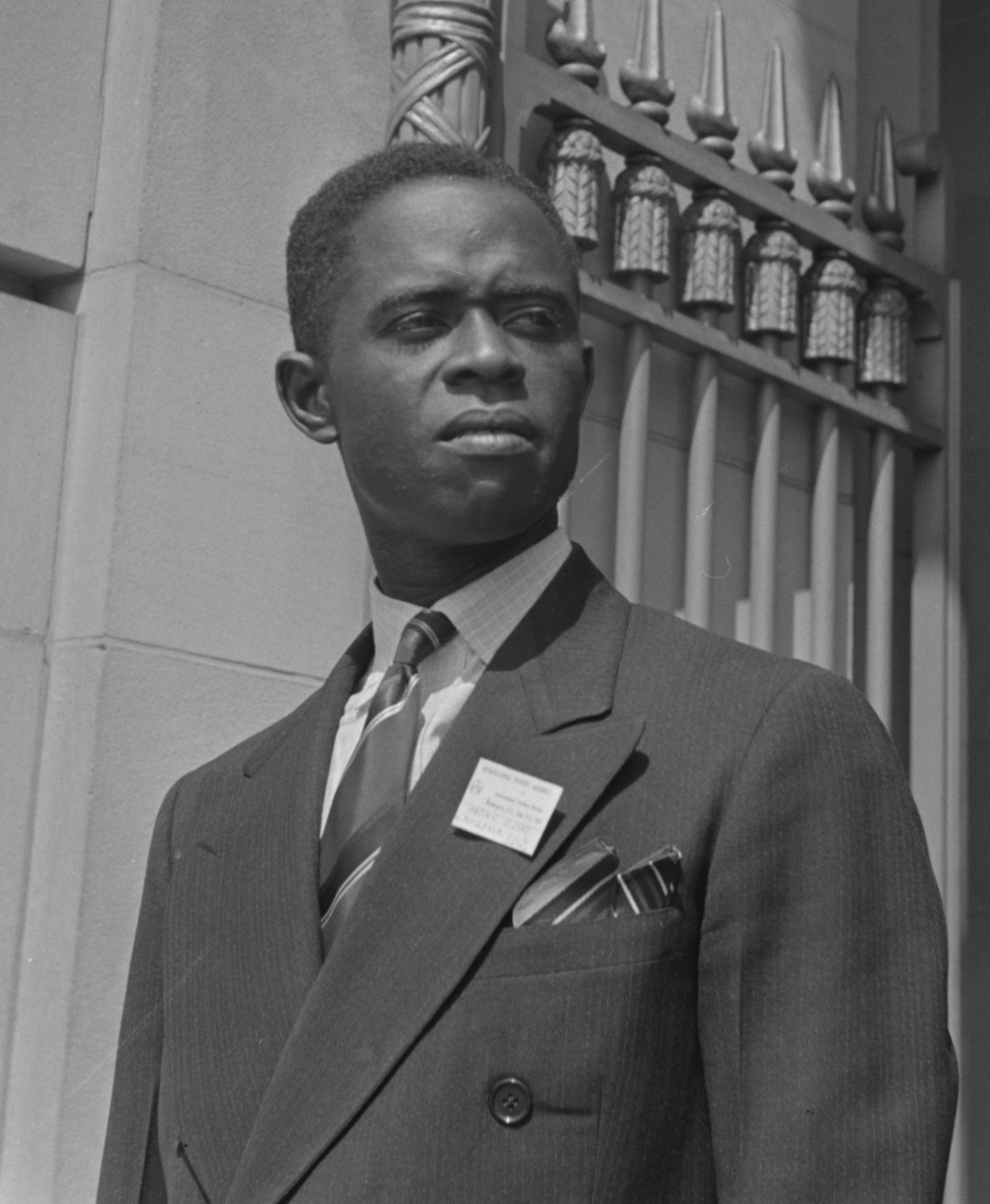
Ojike in Washington, D.C., 1942

Mazi Mbonu Ojike// (c 1914 - November 29, 1956) was a Nigerian nationalist and writer. He advanced from a choirmaster, organist, and teacher in an Anglican school to become a student in America and then a cultural and economic nationalist. He was the Second Vice President NCNC and Deputy Mayor of Lagos in 1951. Ojike was known as the "boycott king" for his slogan, 'boycott the boycottables'. In America, he spent 8 years involved in intellectual pursuit and improving outsiders’ knowledge of Africa speaking from an African perspective. Upon his return, he promoted his brand of Africanisation, a persistent consumption of African forms of cloths, food, dress, religion and dances while also believing in the selective benefits of foreign amenities. Ojike made common the use of the word Mazi as a substitute for Mr.

Among his publications are My Africa and I have Two Countries. Ojike was a sophisticated critic who was passionate about economic nationalism, he was sometimes outspoken which earned him some enmity.

== Early life and education ==
Ojike was born to the family of Mgbeke and Mbonu Emeanlulu in Arondizuogu, Colonial Nigeria. Despite his father's protestations, Ojike attended Anglican schools, he had his primary education at CMS School, Arondizuogu. In 1925, he was a pupil teacher at Anglican Central School in Arondizuogu and Abagana. In 1929, he entered CMS Teachers Training College, Awka to train as a teacher, finishing training in 1931. Ojike soon gained employment at Dennis Memorial Grammar School, Onitsha. At the school, he was a choirmaster, sunday school supervisor and school organist. Ojike gradually became dissatisfied with a missionary's form of education criticizing it as not paramount to African development and suppressing African culture. Soon, he left the school and worked as an agent for West African Pilot. Motivated by the writings of James Aggrey and Azikiwe, Ojike decided to pursue further education abroad.

In November 1938, Ojike left Nigeria with 11 other students for higher education. He started college at Lincoln University (Pennsylvania) before leaving for University of Illinois at Urbana–Champaign and finishing his studies at Ohio State University with a bachelor's degree in Economics. Ojike subsequently earned a master's degree in education and administration.

== Activism ==
In the U.S., Ojike lectured extensively about his experience living in an African cultural environment and his views about colonialism and racism. He wrote rejoinders to articles that portrayed Africa in a negative light in addition to writing two books and a pamphlet on African culture. His books explained cultural practices and debunked the notion of African inferiority. In My Africa, he introduced Americans to his culture partly as a way to promote a cultural relationship between the two cultures. In America, he embraced and learned about a democratic system of governance. He was also passionate about cultural and political nationalism, he rejected colonialism as detrimental to democracy and the idea that African society is a passing culture. Though a cultural nationalist, Ojike did not believe in rejection of all forms of Western culture but the notion of 'cultural plasticity' where Africans borrow certain aspects of a foreign culture but still retain the core social and political values that promotes stability, progress and dignity.

In 1941, Ojike, K.O. Mbadiwe and John Karefa-Smart established the African Students Association of the United States and Canada. Among the objective of the organization was the welfare of African students and the interpretation of African culture to a western audience. Ojike was also a member of two Pan African organizations: American Council of African Education and the African Academy of Arts and Research. The latter was founded by Ojike, Mbadiwe, Orizu, Lawrence Reddick. The academy sponsored a series of well received dance events between 1943 and 1945. In 1945, Ojike was able to attend the United Nations Conference on International Organization as a member of these organizations.

Upon his return to Nigeria, one of his early ideas was the establishment of a university based on an American higher education model. A primary strategy of the university was to save cost by providing education to students locally instead of students spending money to earn degrees outside the country. However, the idea never came to fruition. Between 1947 and 1948, he was the General Manager and a columnist for the West African Pilot, he wrote two columns: "Weekend Catechism" and "Something to Think About". In 1948, he left the pilot to start a business venture, the African Development Corporation, he raised capital and bought a popular bakery formerly owned by Amos Schackleford. After the death of 21 striking coal miners in 1949, Ojike in response wrote a column calling for concerted action against colonial authorities. The article was interpreted as sedition and Ojike was fined. The shootings also motivated him to co-found a broad organization called the National Emergency Committee with Akinola Maja as chairperson. The organization briefly existed for a year and was a national voice opposing racial discrimination before political rivalry broke it up. Ojike was a supporter of a federal system of governance in Nigeria, at a general conference in Ibadan organized to draft the Macpherson Constitution, Ojike and Eyo Ita, co-wrote a minority report criticizing the adoptions of a regional government system and the introduction of House of Chiefs instead of a federal system composed of states with ethnic borders and removal of vested interest in governance.

Ojike was prominent in the activities of NCNC especially in their rallies. He was an agent for mass mobilization and his "Freedom song" was a popular tune in NCNC rallies. He was Second National Vice President of the party and contested and won a seat to represent Lagos at the Legislative Council. In 1951, he was appointed Deputy Mayor of Lagos. In 1953, Ojike became involved in Eastern Nigeria politics and development when he was elected into the Eastern regional assembly. He was first appointed regional Minister of Works in 1954 before moving to finance in the same year. As minister, he supported the introduction of Pay As You Earn taxation and was involved in the establishment of the Eastern Region Finance Corporation and road construction. However, allegations of corruption swirled about his involvement in the corporation's purchase of shares in African Continental Bank while he was the sitting Minister of Finance. He resigned his position in 1956. At the Foster-Sutton tribunal investigating the activities of the corporation, Ojike was resolute in his loyalty to Azikiwe, the founder of the bank and NCNC leader especially when the arguments were framed in the form of economic freedom for the people or extending Western imperialism.

== Boycott king ==
Ojike believed in selective importation and imitation. He wanted Africa to be economical free and politically independent. One of his slogans was "boycott the boycottables", a reduction in consumption of Western goods but investments in education and other economically productive ventures. He preferred palm wine to imported gin and promoted the wearing of African clothes among elites civil servants. He voiced support for the introduction of an African national costume and supported African music and dance, his interest in African music led the founding of the All African Dance Association.

== Personal life and death ==
Ojike married two wives and had 5 children. He was a member of the Reformed Ogboni Society. Ojike died on November 29, 1956, at Parklane Hospital Enugu. He was buried the next day.
