= Omenuko =

1933 Igbo novel by Pita Nwana

- African Heritage Press edition (2014)
- Author: Pita Nwana
- Original title: it is the first Nigerian novel to be written in Igbo language and successful among the Igbos tells story of the politician Igwegbe Odum and Aro who migrated to Arondizuogu
- Translator: Francis W Pritchette
- Language: Igbo
- Publication date: 1935
- Publication place: Nigeria

Omenuko by Pita Nwana (by trade a carpenter) is the first novel to be written in the Igbo language, and the book was very successful among the Igbo people. The book tells the life story of the politician Igwegbe Odum, an Aro Igbo who migrated to Arondizuogu.

Written in 1933, it won a prize in a competition run by the International African Institute and is the biography of the eponymous slave-dealer, originally being published in 1935.
