= Arondizuogu Patriotic Union =

Arondizuogu Patriotic Union (APU) is the umbrella organisation of all Arondizuogu communities in Nigeria and the Diaspora. Established in 1932 in Aba, APU is one of the earliest and most enduring organs of community development set up by an Igbo clan in colonial Nigeria.

== Background ==
The young men of Arondizuogu who laid the foundation for APU left their homes for the first time in the 1920s and early 1930s to seek a better life in the emerging urban centres of colonial Nigeria. They found themselves in social, economic and political environments different from the life they knew at home. Refusing to be intimated or alienated, they held on to that deep feeling of love for the community with which they grew up.

The APU was founded by the educational elite of the Mbonu Ojike generation. Its original mission was to modernise and improve the communities of Arondizuogu "politically, educationally, and morally". Ojike himself was a recording secretary for the movement in 1925. The first president of the Arondizuogu Patriotic Union was the Reverend Chima Nwana.

They assembled at Aba on October 8, 1932, to aggregate ideas on how best to convey the concomitants of modern development with which they were surrounded in the city (such as wide roads, schools, hospitals, post offices, potable water, electricity, court rooms, etc.) to their village community.

The objectives of APU since 1932 have since expanded to include the changing concerns of its massive membership spread around the world.

Between 1966 and 1974 APU was in limbo. However, the leadership role of APU during this interregnum was carried out by other organisations. First, (between 1967 and 1970) by the Arondizuogu War Emergency Council, one of the impromptu bodies formed in various clans at the instance of the authorities of the short-lived Republic of Biafra. Second, (between 1971 and 1974) by the 1st Arondizuogu Community Council set up in consequence of the Divisional Administration Edict passed ion 1971 by the Government of the old East Central State.

== Leaders ==
Over the years, APU, at the national level, has been led by a succession of twelve Presidents General:

- Rev Chima Nwana who served from 1933 to 1947 with a succession of secretaries that included John Okereke, Louis Nwakire Obioha and Egboo Nwankwo;
- Mazi David O. Mbadiwe (who had served as the President pro tempore of the Oct. 1932 inaugural convention) and was elected to serve as APU President from 1947 to 1949 when the National College dispute created an impasse between Ndianiche (from where the president hailed) and APU;
- Mazi Albert Nwosu Igbo "Ogbuanukwu" from Ndiukwu who was appointed to serve as President of APU from 1950 to 1953; and
- Mazi D.T. Okoro took over as APU President and served from 1953 to Jan 15 1966 when all ethnic unions were proscribed by military decree.
- Mazi R.O. Ikoro served as chairman of both the Arondizuogu War Emergency Council and the Arondizuogu Community Council.

== Recent history ==
After the Nigerian Civil War,

- Mazi Ben Ozonede Onwuka became the Union’s President following the resuscitation of APU in 1974 and served till 1976
- Mazi Remy Nwafor Unegbu who was nicknamed the "Perfect Peacemaker" served as President - General of APU from 1976 till he died in office in 1981
- Mazi Reuben O. Egbuonu, who served under Unegbu as 1st Vice President, succeeded him and served as President till 1984
- Aba based business mogul Chief Clement Moore Obioha won the APU Presidency in 1984 who was succeeded
- In 1991 he was succeeded by Dr. Chukwuma Nkemdi Obioha.
- In 1993, Chief Joel West Umeh took over from Chukwuma Obioha and served as President till 1996
- Chief L. Iheanyi Okoro took over in 1996 and served first as Chairman of a Caretaker Committee of the National Executive of APU and, later, as President General by acclamation
- Mazi Oguguo Okereke served as President General of the union between 2000 and 2008. Hon. Barr.
- Uche Ohia from Ndiakeme Ohiauchu who was elected on October 25, 2008, served as President - General
- On October 20, 2012, when Chief Chris Robins Okoro, the current President - General of APU was elected
