= Pita Nwana =

Nigerian novelist

Nwosu Pita Nwana (1881 — 1968) was a Nigerian novelist and carpenter. He is chiefly known as the writer of the first Igbo novel Omenuko. Nwana's Omenuko is regarded as the bedrock for fiction in Igbo literature.

== Life and career ==
Nwana was born in 1881. He was the youngest child in a family of seven. He worked as a carpenter at Methodist College Uzuakoli and later as an interpreter for Rev. J. Wood at then Ibo Institute. In 1933, he wrote Omenuko which won a prize in a competition run by the International African Institute, and was later published by Longman in 1935.
