= Izuogu Mgbokpo =

Chief Izuogu Mgbokpo of Amankwu, Arochukwu was an 18th-century warrior in the Aro Confederacy. He was a slave trader and commander who fought his most famous battle on Ikpa Ora. Chief Izuogu and his ally, Chief Iheme, were the founders of the kingdom of Arondizuogu, of which Chief Izuogu is believed to be the first king. It is said he founded the town by war and settled in a place very close to Ikpa Ora. He remains a hero to the Aro people.
