= Ozo-Mekuri Ndimele =

Nigerian academic (born 1963)

- Born: 13 August 1963 (age 63); Etche, Rivers State, Nigeria

Academic background
- Education: University of Port Harcourt

Academic work
- Discipline: Linguist
- Sub-discipline: Syntax
- Institutions: University of Port Harcourt

Ozo-Mekuri Ndimele is an academic and is the former Vice chancellor of Ignatius Ajuru University of Education after being appointed by the governor of Rivers State, Nyesom Wike on 23 November 2016.

== Early life and education ==
Ndimele was born 13 August 1963 at Akirika, Etche Local Government Area in Rivers State in Nigeria. He had his secondary education at St. Joseph's Secondary School. He obtained a bachelor's degree at University of Port Harcourt and earned his PhD in comparative syntax in 1991 at the same institution.

== Career ==
He served as acting head of the Department for Linguistic and Communication Studies from 1998 to 2005. He became a professor in Comparative Grammar and Communication at the University of Port Harcourt in 2006, and has also served as Dean of the Faculty of Humanities (2010–2014) at the University of Port Harcourt.

== Publications ==
He has written journals and over 30 books. The books he wrote includes; The Principles & Parameters of Universal Grammar, An Advanced English Grammar & Usage, Semantics and the Frontiers of Communication, Morphology & Syntax, Readings on Language, A Concise Grammar and Lexicon of Echie, Four Decades in the Study of Languages & Linguistics in Nigeria, In the Linguistic Paradise, Languages and Cultures in Nigeria, ICT, Globalization & the Study of Languages in Africa.

== Affiliations ==
Ndimele was the national president of Linguistic Association of Nigeria (2003–2009) and the first substantive president of the English Language Teachers Association of Nigeria.(2008-2019-www.eltanigeria.org) He was a member of the Rivers State scholarship board, Transition committee of administration.

== Personal life ==
He is married to Mrs. Joy Adanma Ndimele and has a son and three daughters.
