= Israel Iwekanuno =

Nigerian writer and historian

Israel E. Iwekanuno was a Nigerian writer and historian. He is chiefly known as the writer of Akuko Ala Obosi, the first Igbo language historical book which was published in 1923.
