= Claus Emmelmann =

German academic and scientist

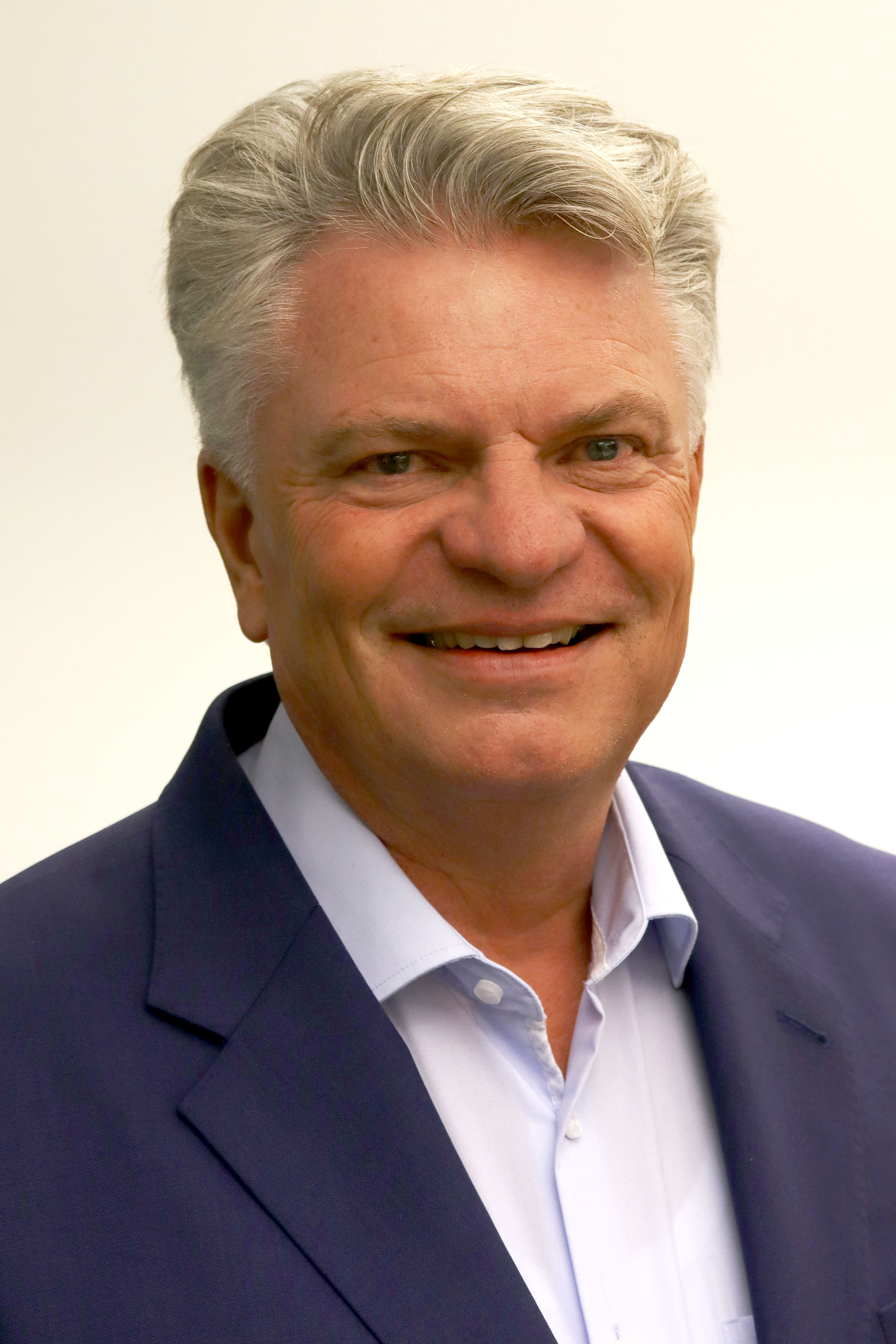
- Born: 29 November 1959 (age 66)
- Education: Leibniz University Hannover
- Known for: Innovations in laser technology and additive manufacturing
- Scientific career
- Workplaces: Hamburg University of Technology, IAPT

Claus Emmelmann (born 29 November 1959) is a German academic and scientist known for his works on laser technology and 3D printing. He was a lecturer at Hamburg University of Technology from 2001 to March 2025.

== Education and career ==
Emmelmann studied mechanical engineering at Leibniz University Hannover in 1985. Along Free and Hanseatic City of Hamburg, he founded the Laser Zentrum Nord GmbH in 2006. In 2018, he transferred the LZN with its research team to the Institute for Addilltive Production Technologies (IAPT). Until 2020 he was the Institute Director of IAPT.

Emmelmann initiated the Scientific Innovation Prize (WIP) along with Rotary International Hamburg-Haake in 2020. He received the German Industry Innovation Award in 2014, and was nominated for the German Future Prize in 2015. He was honored as Hamburg's Person of the Year in 2016.

== Publications ==
Emmelmann has published over 600 national and international publications, and has an h-index of 30.
