= Odo Masquerade Festival =

Annual masquerade festival in Nigeria

Odo masquerade festival
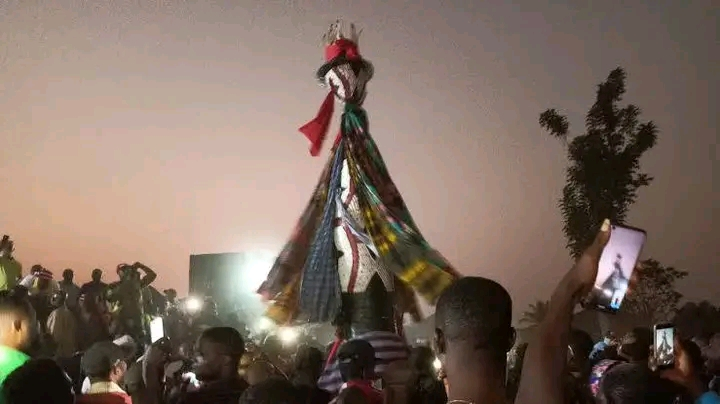
- A Ngwo odo
- Status: Active
- Genre: Festivals
- Frequency: Every Two years
- Location: Enugu State
- Country: Nigeria

Odo masquerade festival is a masquerade festival Celebrated in some parts of Enugu State the South-eastern part of Nigeria. It is an annual festival holding every two years, At time when the dead are believed to return in masked form to their families and community.

== Historical origin ==
Odo comes from the word "Odomagana" meaning "masquerade" in some parts of Igboland. Odo is celebrated mostly in the Ngwo clan, the Ebe people and the Ojebe Ogene clan, and some parts of the Ezeagu and Nsukka regions.

== Gallery ==
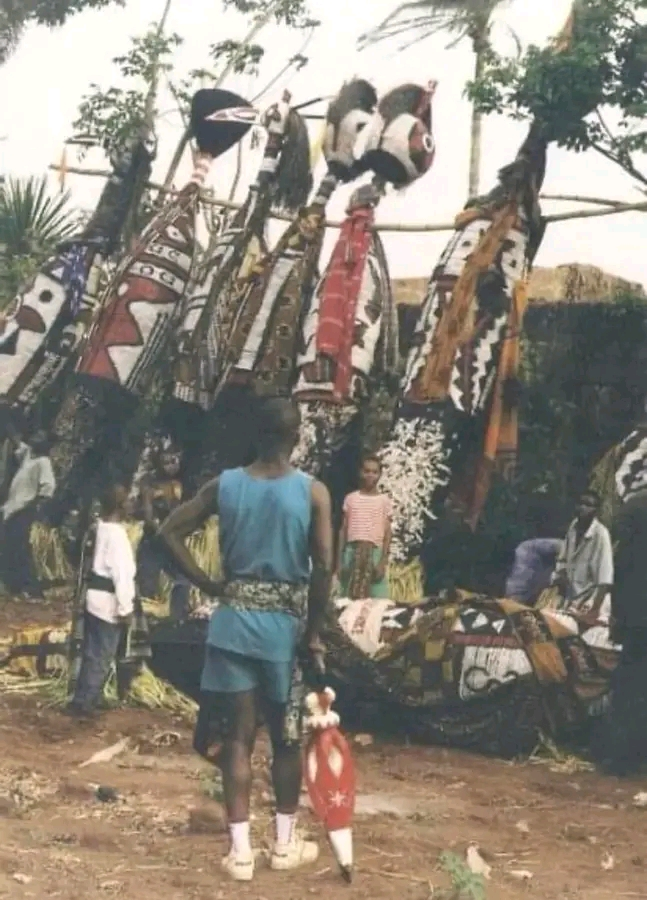
Ngwo odo masquerade

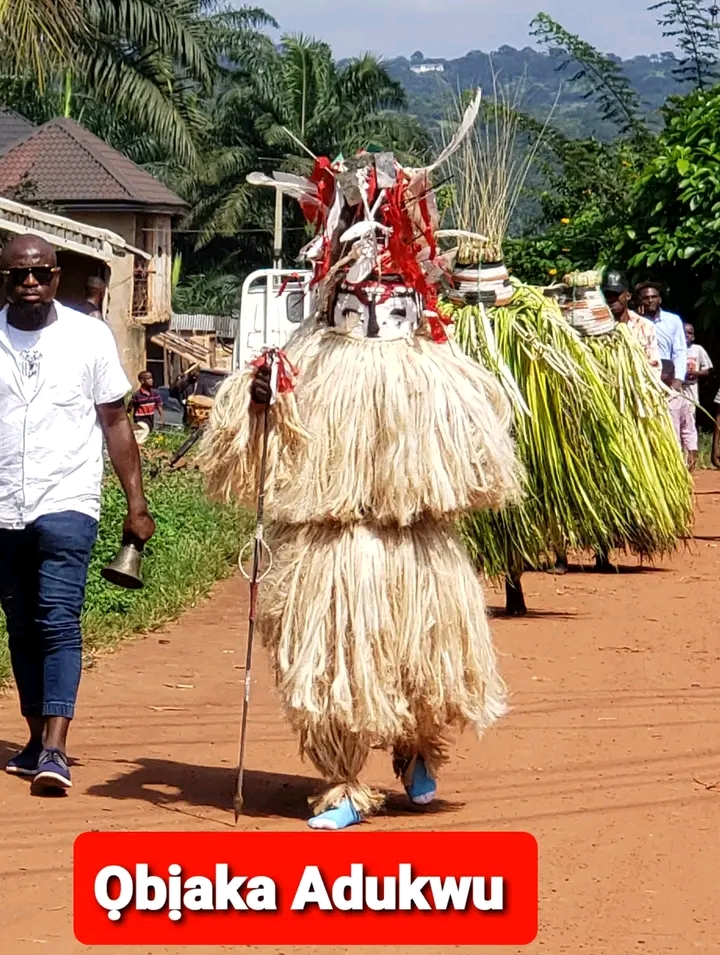
Obiaka of Adukwu Ebe

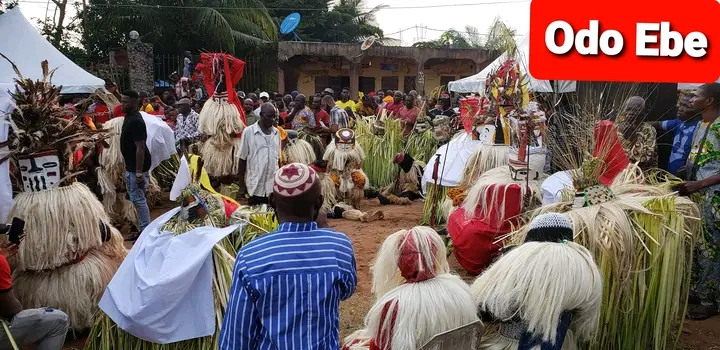
A gathering of multiple odo in Ebe
