= Clara Thue Ebbell =

Norwegian author (1880–1971)

Clara Thue Ebbell (22 February 1880 – 1971) was a Norwegian author.

She was born in Grimstad. She is known for her works of young adult fiction; titles include Hun som skrev Onkel Toms hytte (1916), Da Mayflower drog (1920), Fire på egen hånd (1935, 1959), Maja (1960) and I ungdomsbyen med Henrik Ibsen (1966). She also wrote biographies of Katharina von Bora (1917), Catherine Booth (1929) and Cathinka Guldberg (1940), and took part in feminist work.

She was married to Bendix Joachim Ebbell. She was eleven years his junior, and outlived him by 34 years.
