= K. O. Mbadiwe =

Nigerian politician (1915–1990)

Kingsley Mbadiwe
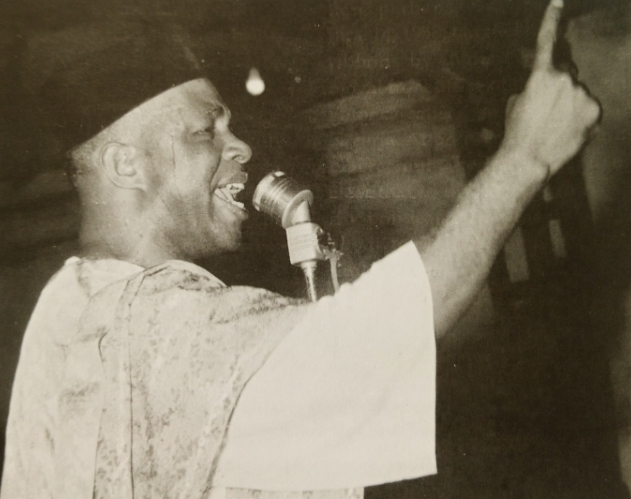

Central Minister of Lands, Survey and Natural Resources
- In office 1954–1955
- Preceded by: Okoi Arikpo
- Constituency: Orlu

Central Minister of Communication and Aviation
- In office 1955–1957
- Preceded by: Arthur Prest

Personal details
- Born: 1915 Oneh, Orlu Division
- Died: 1990 (aged 74–75)
- Party: NCNC
- Occupation: Nationalist/Politician

Kingsley Ozumba Mbadiwe // (1915–1990) was a Nigerian nationalist, politician, statesman, and government minister in the Nigerian First Republic and a Biafran Roving ambassador during the civil war.

== Early life ==
Mbadiwe was born to the family of Mbadiwe Odum from Arondizuogu then under then Orlu division of present-day Imo State. His uncle, Igwegbe Odum, was a warrant chief in the colonial era.

== Education ==
He started primary education at St Mary's Catholic School, Port Harcourt, and finished it at a government school in Aba. He then attended the Hope Waddell Training Institute, Calabar, Aggrey Memorial College, Arochukwu, Igbobi College, Lagos and the Baptist Academy, Lagos. At Baptist Academy, Samuel Akintola and E.E. Esau were staff members, while some of his schoolmates at Igbobi were Taslim Elias, Horatio Thomas and Justice F.O. Coker. After his secondary education, he dabbled into trading by establishing Mbadiwe Produce Association in 1937. He left Nigeria to study at Columbia University and New York University for a number of years. While in America, he helped to establish an African student's association, through which he gained the attention of the U.S. First Lady Eleanor Roosevelt, who received him and his organization in the White House.

== Career ==
After returning from the U.S., he started another business and established a research institute on African Arts. He soon entered the Nigerian political scene and joined the National Council of Nigeria and the Cameroons. In 1951, he was elected into the Eastern Region House of Assembly. He was re-elected in 1954, and shortly thereafter appointed Minister for Lands and National Resources. In 1957, he was appointed Minister for Commerce. However, his political success was to undergo a great challenge when in mid-1958, he and Kola Balogun attempted to remove Dr. Nnamdi Azikiwe as the leader of National Council of Nigeria and the Cameroons (NCNC). Mbadiwe set up his own newspaper, The Daily Telegraph, as an organ of protest. He later re-joined the party and was appointed Minister for Trade and Communications and also served as a special adviser to the Prime Minister, advising on African affairs. After the secession of the Eastern Region he was appointed as a Roving Ambassador by the Biafran president Odumegwu Ojukwu and held this post till the end of the civil war.

== Personal life ==
Mbadiwe had six children namely Betty, Greg, Paul, Chris, George, and Francis. His brother, James Green Mbadiwe was a businessman conducting on his account in the Northern Region, he owned the now defunct Green's Hotel on Ahmadu Bello Way, Kaduna built in 1939 and commissioned by Azikiwe. The property later became a shopping center, J. Green Mbadiwe died in 1980.

He built and inhabited the landmark residence, The Palace of The People, at Ndianiche Uno. It was commissioned by Prime Minister Sir Abubakar Tafawa Balewa in 1965. He married three wives.
