= Egede, Enugu State =

Coordinates: 6°32′51″N 7°22′02″E

Egede is a town in the Udi Local Government Area in Enugu State of Nigeria. It is situated between Ebe in the south; Umuoka in the north; Affa in the west; Okpatu and Awhum in the east.

Many people in Egede belong to the Ugwunye clan. It is made up of eight (8) potential units or councils or villages. Egede has six villages: Anekeneze, Amozala, Okwum, Umuokpala, Umuanum and Umuovu. The town has two major segments or divides: Ikeghe and Ibite

According to tradition, the name “Egede” came from a son of Ugwunye and Ukwu.. The people of Egede generally speak the Igbo language

== Geographical location ==
To the north and northeast are: Umuanum and Umuokpala villages bounded by Amozalla Affa and Okpatu, Umulumgbe and Umuoka towns respectively.

East is Umuokpala, Okwum and part of Anekenze village, bounded by part of Okpatu town, while in the southeast and south are Anekeneze village bounded by Awhum, Ukana, and Ebe town, On the west axis are Amozalla(bounded by Eke and Amansiodo towns) and Umuovu village bounded by Obinagu Affa.

Egede is surrounded by the following hills: Ugwu Ugwudu, Ugwu Ikpa, Ugwu Odighe, Ugwu Obelu.

== Demographics ==
The population of the Udi local government council was 234,002 in the 2006 census. Egede could be said to represent a sizeable percentage of that figure.

== Origins ==
According to one tradition, Ugwunye was the ancestral mother of the Ugwunye clan. Ugwunye was married to Onichaakulu (Awa). The couple gave birth to Nike. When the couple separated, Ugwunye married Onyimonyi. Their son was Ukwu, the father of Egede.

Another story from Chief Michael Onwuzu was that Onyimonyi married Ugwunye, then died. After that, Ukwu married Ugwunye, his mother.

== History ==
=== Traditional society ===
The traditional Egede political organization was based on a quasi-democratic republican system of government. This system of administration was like a consultative assembly of the common people governed and administered by a council of elders. In tight knit communities, this system guaranteed its citizens equality, as opposed to a feudalist system with a king ruling over subjects. Although title holders were respected because of their accomplishments and capabilities, they were never revered as kings, but often performed special functions given to them by such assemblies.

Law starts with the Umunna, which is a male line of descent from a founding ancestor (who the line is sometimes named after) with groups of compounds containing closely related families headed by the eldest male member. Law matters are often settled through mediators while the banking system for loans and savings were used. The Umunna could be seen as the most formidable pillar among the people of Egede in the traditional era.

A system of serfdom or slavery existed in Egede. According to Olaudah Equiano, serfs were not required to do more work than other members of the community, but were not permitted to eat with the free-born. It was against the backdrop of this early traces of serfdom that slave trade experience became feasible in Africa.

=== Early contact with colonial masters ===
The British colonialists arrived in Egede in the 1870s, bringing Christianity and western education. According to some authors, increased encounters between the people of Egede and other ethnic groups in the region led to a deepening unique sense of identity. Also, the transition from a decentralized town government to a centralized system run by the British caused conflicts. The British introduced Warrant Chiefs in areas without monarchies. The diversity within each of Nigeria's major ethnic groups slowly decreased and distinctions between the Igbo and other large ethnic groups, such as the Hausa and the Yoruba, became sharper.

The tradition of building houses out of mud walls and thatched roofs began to phase out. People started building with cement blocks and zinc roofs. Roads for vehicles were built. Buildings such as hospitals and schools began to emerge. These were some of the impacts of the people's early contact with the colonial masters.

== Feasts ==
The town has three major festivals{

- The first is the Odo festival. It is associated with the return and departure of the Odo spirits. These occur every two years which typically mark the Odo seasons.
- The second is the Ogba festival. Ogba means the rite of passage into adulthood. Although it is also open to women but it is substantively a male age-grade ritual. It takes place every ten years. Within that cycle, each segment of the village celebrates its own on a different date. The choice of any date is based on the traditional dating system also guided by the Igbo native weeks.
- The third is the aka-ani (New-Yam or Earth Product) festival. It is celebrated in appreciation of the yam harvest. It is celebrated on the first Saturday of September.

== Religion ==
Before the arrival of Christianity, many people in Egede worshiped the Odo deity. Each village has its special variant of the Odo and accordingly has a dedicated forest for the Odo. Odo Egede includes the nemaa (mother of spirits), the okpoakarika (the sporting and policing spirit) and the okwuikpe (the dancing spirit).

Egede has its parish, Saint Cyril Catholic Church. There are few Protestant churches in Egede as the town is predominantly Catholic.

== Sources ==
- A history of Egede town by the Association of Egede Indigenous Priest and Religious
- Shillington, Kevin. Encyclopedia of African History. CRC Press. 2005, p. 674.
- Afigbo, A. E. Groundwork of Igbo history. Lagos: Vista Books. 1992. pp. 522–541
- Mathews, Martin P.. Nigeria: Current Issues and Historical Background. Nova Publishers. 2002, p. 38.
