= Bendix Joachim Ebbell =

Norwegian author

Bendix Joachim Ebbell (1869 – 1937) was a Norwegian writer.

He was born in Christiania. He is known for his works of young adult fiction; titles include Vi på løkken (1900), Gutter som blev mænd (1911), Veien mot nord (1925) and De som drog ut (1925). He also wrote the comedy Menneskebørn which was staged at the National Theatre in 1908.

He was married to Clara Thue Ebbell.
