= Tony Ubesie =

Nigerian novelist

- Tony Ubesie
- Born: Anthony Uchenna Ubesie; 22 February 1950; St. Barth's Maternity Home, Asata, Achi, Enugu
- Died: 11 February 1994 (aged 43); Mmaku, Enugu state
- Education: University of Nigeria
- Occupations: Novelist; Broadcaster; Poet; Theatre director; Cultural activist
- Children: 5
- Writing career
- Language: Igbo language
- Years active: 1973 — 1994
- Genre: Literary fiction

Anthony Uchenna Ubesie ig (22 February 1950 — 11 February 1994) was a Nigerian novelist, poet, playwright, broadcaster, educator, community leader, actor, and producer. He is widely known as one of the pioneers of early Igbo literature.

== Life and career ==
Ubesie was born in Achị in Enugu state on 22 February 1950. He studied Linguistics and Nigerian Languages specializing in the Igbo language at the University of Nigeria, Nsukka from 1976 to 1980. Prior to that, he worked as a farmer and translator for primary and secondary schools. He translated books that were written in English to Igbo language. He died on 11 February 1994 as a result of a car accident, and according to speculations, he had many unpublished titles.

== Bibliography ==
According to BBC Igbo

- Ụkwa ruo oge ya ọ daa ISBN 0195751892 (1973)
- Isi akwụ dara n'ala (1973)
- Mmiri ọkụ e ji egbu ibe ISBN 9780582636156 (1974)
- Ụkpana okpoko buuru (1975)
- Ụkpaka mịịrị onye ụbịam (1975)
- Jụọ Obinna ISBN 9780195753950 (1976)
- Okokporo (1988)

== Relevant studies ==
- Mba, Mary. "Prescriptive and Proscriptive Female Gender Role Proverbs in Tony Uchenna Ubesie’s Isi Akwu Dara N’Ala." Proverbium 32, no. 1 (2015): 237-260.
