= Adamma (masquerade) =

Igbo maiden spirit mask

Adamma Dance as recorded by the Audiovisuals of Igbo Dances (AID) Project

Adamma is a contemporary maiden spirit mask that originates from the Igbo of southeastern Nigeria. The mask is performed by men only and is accompanied by music that the masker dances to. Unlike other Igbo masks Adamma mask does not have any spiritual value behind it.

Adanma masquerades are highly respected and valued in Igbo communities, often serving as mediators of peace during conflict resolution. The masquerade originates from Enugu. According to folklore, it is said to have begun with a young lady known for her beauty and kind heart, who was kidnapped by men.

"Adanma" or what some spell as "Adamma" is also a girls name in Igboland Nigeria and it means, the first beautiful daughter of the family.

== Adanma Masquerade and identity ==
According to scholars, the Adanma masquerade, as a form of performance, manifests in modern cross-dressing among content creators in Nigeria and is viewed as a form of drag and radical resistance against gender norms. The Adanma masquerade identity allows men to conceal their masculinity and embrace femininity through their dance movements and gyrations to the rhythm of drums and the sound of the ogene.

In Igboland, the Adanma is not necessarily regarded in the same light as other masquerades, such as the Mmanwu, which have spiritual connotations and are performed within secret societies. However, it is still perceived as a manifestation of a female spirit taking control, especially when viewed through the lens of gender psychology.
