= Ngwo =

Town in Enugu, Nigeria

Ngwo is a town located in the state of Enugu, Nigeria, with a population of about 100,000 people.

== Festival ==
Ngwo has a rich traditional culture. Every two years, the people of Ngwo celebrate the odo festival which is Odo masquerade festival Celebrated by the whole communities for three ngwo months.

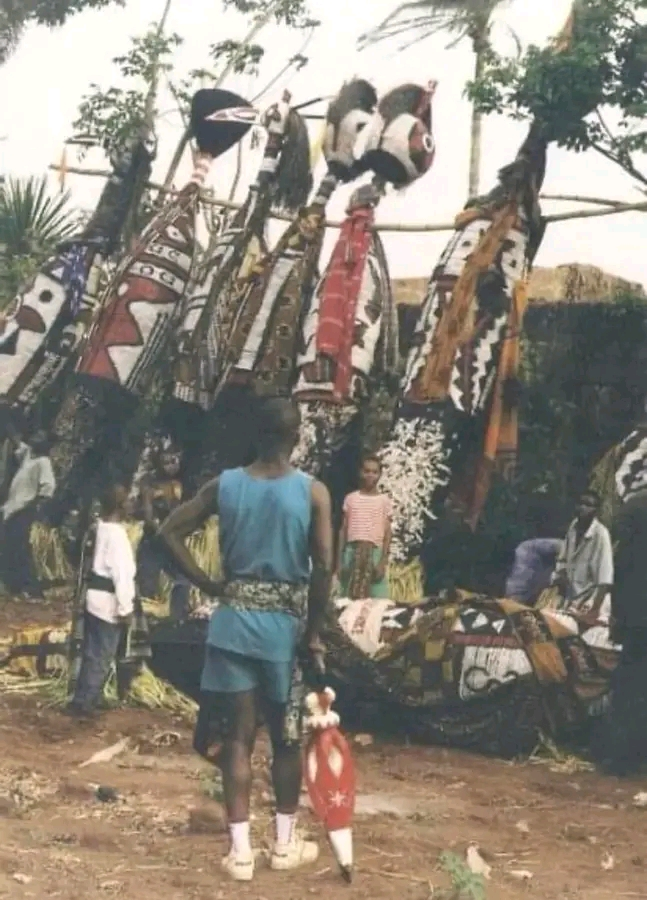
Odo Ngwo

== Geography ==
Geographically, Ngwo is bounded to the north by Abor, to the south by Nsude, to the west by Eké, and to the east by Niké. Ngwo remains a historically important place in Enugu state.

Ngwo is a hilly area, with much of the land area being up to 600 metres (2,000 feet) above sea level. The hills are moderately sloping and undulating. It also contains the Ngwo Pine forest.

== Villages ==
Ngwo-asaa;

- Enugu ngwo
- Etiti ngwo
- Amachalla ngwo
- Ukaka ngwo
- Okwojo ngwo
- Amaebo ngwo
- Umuase ngwo

Ngwo-uno;

- Amaeke ngwo
- Amankwo ngwo
- Uborji ngwo

== Notable places in Ngwo ==
- Ogbete
- New market
- 9th mile
- Aqua rapha table water
- Ama brewery
- Odegba market
- Iva valley
  - Old unth enugu
- Coal camp enugu
- Shoperite shopping mall
- CBN headquarters
- Enugu secretariat
  - Prisons enugu
- Magistrate court enugu
- Parkline hospitals
- Golf arena G.R.A
- State cid

== Notable people ==
=== Politicians ===
- C.C Onoh
- Bianca Odumegwu-Ojukwu
- Osita Ngwu
- Ibenaku Onoh

=== Actors ===
- Patience Ozokwor

=== Writers ===
- Nuzo Onoh

== See also ==
- Ngwo Pine forest
