= Abor, Enugu State =

Town in Nigeria

Coordinates: 6°28′30″N 7°24′30″E

Abor is a town in southeastern Nigeria, located in Enugu State near the city of Enugu.

Abor is located on the Old Enugu-Nsukka Road, an important thoroughfare for travelers heading to northern Nigeria from the east. It consists of eight separate villages.

== Education ==
Abor is home to two Catholic parishes and three high schools: Chist High School, St Thereasa Girls Secondary, and Girls Technical School.

== Villages ==
The eight villages that make up Abor are Ugwunani, Ozalla, Amukwu, Dinigweze, Dinunobe, Ubiekpo, Amezike, and Umuavulu.

Umuavulu Village: one of the eight that make up Abor, is known for her industrious people. Umuavulu Village has 13 hamlets: Umuozor, Ubom, Eziagu, Nzuko, Umuoka, Uwenu na uwani, Ndi-Ngwu, Umuikwo, Umuezike, Amaogwu, Ohemje, Aragu, Aguma, Orobo, and Ezionyia. Each is equivalent to a town of its own.

Ubiekpo: Comprises six hamlets: Umuozor, Onuodagwu, Umudioku, Umuozi, Amaekwulu na Ebouwani, and Amagu.

== Industry ==
Umuezeani village, another of Abor's constituent villages, is home to Nigerian Breweries' Ama Greenfield brewery, the largest brewery in Nigeria. The Onyeama mine of the Nigerian Coal Corporation is also located nearby.
