= Arondizuogu =

Town in Imo State, Nigeria

Coordinates: 5°53′28.62″N 7°9′47.28″E

Arondizuogu// (Aro-ndizuogu) is a town inhabited by the Aro people, an Igbo subgroup in Imo State of Nigeria. The Arondizuogu community is believed to have migrated from Arochukwu in the present Abia State to their current settlements in Imo State, which include the Okigwe, Ideato North and Onuimo local governments.

== History ==
=== Origins ===
Arondizuogu is believed to have been founded in the mid-18th century through the forceful occupation and open massacre of the people of Umualaoma by Mazi Izuogu Mgbokpo and his brothers. Izuogu Mgbokpo, a slave merchant from Arochukwu, and who came to Awka in search of slaves, was harbored by a friend from Umualaoma. Izuogu Mgbokpo had two children and three brothers. The children were Uche and Awa while the brothers were Imoko and Njoku. Iheme was his chief servant and came from Isi-Akpu Nise, in Awka. Izuogu captured more slaves, whom he sold to European slave merchants. Arondizuogu people refer to themselves as "Izuogu na Iheme". Arondizuogu itself signifies "Aro of the people of Izuogu," in Igbo. Some of the people he enslaved kept his name even after they were freed from captivity.

Most of the wars over Arondizuogo were brought to an end by the patriarch of the host community, Ezerioha Udensi of Obiokwara, Obinihu, Umualaoma (i.e. Isuokpu). He organised the peaceful allocation or donation of lands to Arondizuogu, after concluding that the Arondizuogu people could no longer return to Aro Chukwu.

In the 19th century, Mazi Okoli Idozuka migrated from Isi-Akpu Nise to Arondizuogu. As a warrior, he expanded Arondizuogu's boundaries. He later changed his name to Okoro Idozuka, an Aro equivalent of his former name. He was a wealthy and ruthless slave trader but was also a great leader. Nwankwo Okoro was the first son of Okoro Idozuka, who at the age of 21 joined his father in the slave trade. When the British came, they made him a warrant chief. To this day, Arondizuogu is the biggest former Aro colony and a land of mainly immigrants.

=== Historical sites ===
Places of interest in Arondizuogu include Mazi Mbonu Ojike Cottage (village home of Nigeria's late "Boycott King"); Uno Ogologo (a safe house built in 1887 for hiding children during the slave trade era); the Stone Palace (a storehouse erected by late Chief Green Mbadiwe, West Africa's first millionaire, for his father, Umualaoma Nkwo Ochie); Mbadiwe Odum; Ngeze stream; Ogbuti Ezumezu (visitor's chamber of Ikeji musician Pericoma Okoye); LN Motel Plaza, Home Diamond Hotel; National High School, Arondizuogu (pioneer model school built by Mazi Nwosu Elele Igwiloh and commissioned in 1951); Iheme Memorial Secondary School (a second model school commissioned in 1951); Palace of The People (country home of Nigerian politician K. O. Mbadiwe, commissioned by Nigeria's prime minister Abubakar Tafawa Balewa in 1965); Upiti rice fields; Obi Omenuko, homestead of Igwegbe Odum; and Ngene Okwe, a natural spring.

Ndi Izuogu live in many local government areas in Imo State. Although they have almost the same dialect as the group of Igbos in Anambra State, apart from Ndi Uche (descendants of Izuogu's first son) they still retain a slightly different dialect. Arondizuogu, which is made up of 20 villages, inhabits three Local Government Areas. The local governments inhabited include Okigwe, Ideato North, and Onuimo.

== Geography ==
=== Location ===
Arondizuogu is a group of sprawling communities with the largest area being Umualaoma town (formerly Isiokpu).

=== Communities ===
==== Izuogu community and their locations ====
- Uche – a) Ochie Uno, b) Umuduru (near Aniche Uwakonye), c) Ikpatu in Aro-Okigwe, (Ofe Imo), d) Aro Onu Imo, e) Ikpa Alike, f) Okporo Amiri, g) Ala Ocha, h) Amaorji (all in Aro Amuro), i) Umunna in Aro-Okigwe, j) Ala Ohuru near Umualaoma (formerly known as Oree) Okigwe, k) Ikpaebi Aro Umulolo
- Awa – a) Ochie Uno, b) Aro Umulolo, c) Aro-Okigwe
- Njoku – a) Ochie Uno, b) Aro Amuro, c) Ikpa Akanu (Aro-Okigwe), Aro Ogii (Boundary)
- Imoko – a) Ochie Uno, b) Aro-Okigwe
- Amazu – a) Ochie Uno, b) Ikpa Akaputa, c) Ikpa Ocha, d) Ndi Okoli Igbo, e) Aro Amuro, f) Ikpa Akwu
- Ejezie – a) Ochie Uno
- Adimoha – a) Ochie Uno
- Anyake – a) Ochie Uno
- Uwaonu – a) Aro Okigwe
- Ucheagwu – a) Aro Umulolo
- Ndubisi – a) Aro Umulolo
- Ekwulu

==== Iheme Community and their locations ====
- Aniche – a) Ochie Uno, b) Obinetiti, c) Uwakonye, d) Ndi be Ezeana, e) Ndi be Ogbuda, f) Ikpenyi, g) Aro-Okigwe
- Onuoha – a) Ochie Uno, b) Ofe Imo, c) Aro Umulolo
- Eze – a) Ochie Uno, b) Aro Umulolo, c) Aro Ofe Imo, d) Umuedi
- Okonkwo – a) Ochie Uno, b) Ofe Imo
- Ogbuonyeoma - a) Ochie Uno, b) Ndi be Uche, c) Umudike, d) Okwu Achara, e) Umuedi, f) Umu Orji
- Akeme – a) Ochie Uno, b) Ohia Uchu, c) Ikpa Okoli, d) Nduka, e) Ugwaku
- Ukwu – a) Ochie Uno, b) Ofe Imo
- Akunwanta – a) Ochie Uno, b) Nkwo Fada, c) Idozuka (Aro Umulolo)

== Festivals ==
=== Arondizuogu day ===
Instituted in 1948, ‘Arondizuogu Day’ is an annual end-of-year convention of people of Arondizuogu descent at home and abroad. It is a day set aside to celebrate achievements, review challenges, and generally foster patriotism in the community. For the culture–loving people of Arondizuogu, the day is a unique annual homecoming that they celebrate with much aplomb comparable only to their popular Ikeji Festival, which is touted to be “the greatest carnival of masks and masquerades in Africa”.

=== Ikeji ===
The Ikeji cultural festival of Arondizuogu is a popular festival that brings the Igbo-speaking community around the world together. Its origin dates back to over five centuries and it is acclaimed as the biggest pan-Igbo cultural community festival with a strong heritage and international recognition. It is witnessed by thousands of people every year.

It is arguably the biggest cultural festival in Igboland. In contemporary times, each year has witnessed an increase in grandeur, display, dance, sophistication, and all-inclusive participation of all Arondizuogu people and friends. The festival is marked with colourful displays of different masquerades, such as Ogionu, Mgbadike, Nwaaburuja, and Ozoebune, prestigiously parading across the market square to the public's admiration. The essence of the festival, which ranks among the best surviving traditional ceremonies of the Arondizuogu people, is to celebrate the harvest of the first yams. It serves to unify and foster ties among Aro people who are spread across the entire Igbo-speaking states and part of Cross River State. It appeals to the entire Igbo-speaking peoples, both at home and abroad.

Ikeji is a four-day festival of propitiation, thanksgiving, and feasting held annually in March or April. Reckoned with the Igbo calendar, these four days correspond to one Igbo week of four market days (Eke, Oye/Orie, Afo, and Nkwo). Each of these days has a special significance and represents one of the several dimensions of Ikeji – a festival renowned for sumptuous feasting, fascinating masquerades, pulsating rhythms, and colourful performances. Traditional musical instruments used to accompany the masquerades are ekwe (wooden slit drum) of various sizes, ogene (metal gong), bells, maracas and oja (wooden flutes). The flutist is a very important element in the festival. He deftly communicates with the masquerades – weaving soulful melodies and blending esoteric messages into the intoxicating rhythm of the drums. Another interesting aspect of Ikeji is the raconteur known as ima mbem – an imaginative tale delivered with a musical cadence that only the initiated can sometimes understand or comprehend. The importance of the flutist during Ikeji festival is very vital, for he communicates things hidden from the ordinary eyes to the masquerades, combined with soulful melodies, steps, and gestures, blending esoteric messages into the intoxicating rhythm of the drums to the admiration of the crowd.

On the last day of the festival, a ram is usually tied to a pole at a popular market square with a single thread. Somebody with the strongest protection from any juju of whatever type is expected to leisurely walk to the ram amid heavy attempts with juju from other people to knock him down, maim him, or kill him. Only the brave can participate, while the not-so-brave will either abstain from or remain with the crowd as spectators. Only the brave can stand forward from the crowd, one after another, and approach the tree to untie the ram. However, each contender will be attacked by forces to stop him from reaching the ram. If overwhelmed, he will beat a retreat back to his starting point. Eventually, the bravest among the masquerades participating in the competition for that year's festival, after overcoming all odds, will reach the ram, untie it and take it to the thunderous applause of the spectators. This would be followed by visits to his house by fellow kinsmen with food and wine to elevate the status of his village. Each year, this is used to commemorate the person in Arondizuogu and neighbouring towns with the strongest juju or voodoo power—Pericoma Okoye won several of these contests.

== Arondizuogu Patriotic Union ==
The Arondizuogu Patriotic Union (APU) is the umbrella organisation of all Arondizuogu communities in Nigeria and the Diaspora. Established in 1932 in Aba, APU was one of the earliest and most enduring organs of community development set up by an Igbo clan in colonial Nigeria. The young men of Arondizuogu who laid the foundation for APU left their homes for the first time in the 1920s and early 1930s to seek a better life in the emerging urban centres of colonial Nigeria. They found themselves in social, economic, and political environments different from the life they knew at home. In order to combat intimidation and alienation, they held on to a deep love for the community in which they grew up. They assembled at Aba on October 8, 1932, to aggregate ideas on how best to convey the modern development with which they were surrounded in the city (such as wide roads, schools, hospitals, post offices, potable water, electricity, courtrooms, etc.) to their village community.
