= Nigerian traditional rulers =

Subnational monarchs in West Africa

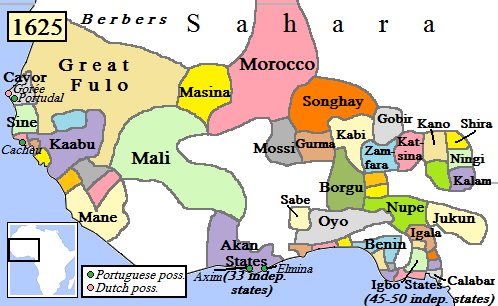
West Africa in 1625 showing the main states at that time. Modern Nigeria covers the eastern part of this area, including the Oyo Empire, the Benin Kingdom (unrelated to current Republic of Benin), the Igbo states to the east, and the Hausa / Fulani states such as Katsina and Kano to the north.

Nigerian traditional rulers are non-sovereign monarchs who often derive their titles from the rulers of independent states or communities that existed prior to the formation of modern Nigeria. Although they do not have formal political power, in many cases they continue to command respect from their people and have considerable influence in their community.

Though their bearers usually maintain the monarchical styles and titles of their sovereign ancestors, both their independent activities and their relations with the central and regional governments of Nigeria are closer in substance to those of the high nobility of old Europe than to those of actual reigning monarchs.

== Pre-colonial period ==
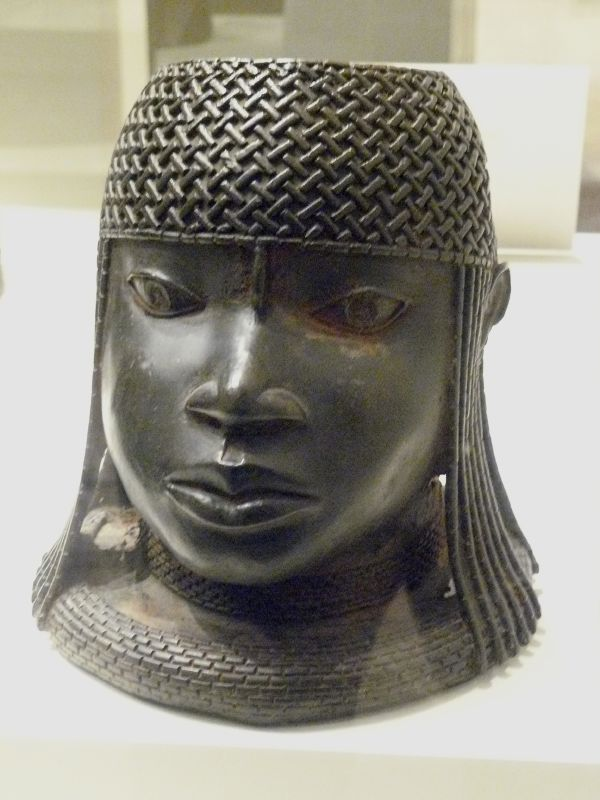
Image of a 16th-century ruler (Oba) of the Benin Kingdom

Modern Nigeria encompasses lands traditionally occupied by highly diverse ethnic groups with very different languages and traditions. In broad terms, the southeast was occupied mainly by Igbo, the Niger Delta by Edo and Igbo related people, the southwest by Yoruba and related people and the north by Hausa and Fulani people, with a complex intermingling of different ethnic groups in the Middle-Belt between north and south. In total there were (and are) more than 200 distinct ethnic groups.

Before the arrival of the British in the late 19th century, the history of the area was turbulent, with periods when empires such as those of Oyo, Kanem-Bornu and Sokoto gained control over large areas, and other periods when the states were more fragmented. Although political structures differed widely between different ethnic groups, it was common for each town or collection of towns to have a recognized ruler, who might in turn be subordinate to the ruler of a larger polity. Thus the Sokoto caliphate was divided into emirates, with the emirs loosely subordinate to the Sultan of Sokoto, although at times acting as independent rulers.

== Colonial era ==
Europeans had long traded with the coastal states, primarily exchanging cotton and other manufactured goods for slaves and palm oil products at centers such as Calabar, Bonny and Lagos. The Niger Coast Protectorate was established in 1891 holding a small area along the coast. During the period 1879–1900 the Royal Niger Company made a concerted effort to take control of the interior, using disciplined troops armed with the Maxim gun, and making treaties of "protection" with the local rulers. The company's territory was sold to the British government in 1900, with the southern region merged with the Niger Coast Protectorate to become the Southern Nigeria Protectorate and the Northern Nigeria Protectorate remaining separate. In 1914 the two were merged into the Colony and Protectorate of Nigeria, with roughly the same boundaries as the modern state of Nigeria.

The first British High Commissioner for Northern Nigeria, Lord Frederick Lugard, tried to rule through the traditional rulers, and this approach was later extended to the south. Lugard's successor Hugh Clifford left this system in place in the north, where the emirate system had long traditions, but introduced a legislative council with some elected members in the south, relegating the traditional rulers to mainly symbolic roles. Over time, the relationship between the colonial administration and the traditional rulers evolved. For example, the Tiv people, at the time the fourth largest ethnic group in the country, had always been extremely decentralized and therefore had no paramount ruler. The British created the office of Tor Tiv in 1947, appointing Makere Dzakpe as the first holder of this title, in order to have a "traditional ruler" to speak for the Tiv people. By Nigeria's Independence in 1960, each federated region of the country had a House of Chiefs made up of ordinary and extraordinary members. In the Western Region, an example of the latter was Funmilayo Ransome-Kuti, while in the Eastern Region, another was Margaret Ekpo.

== Independent Nigeria ==
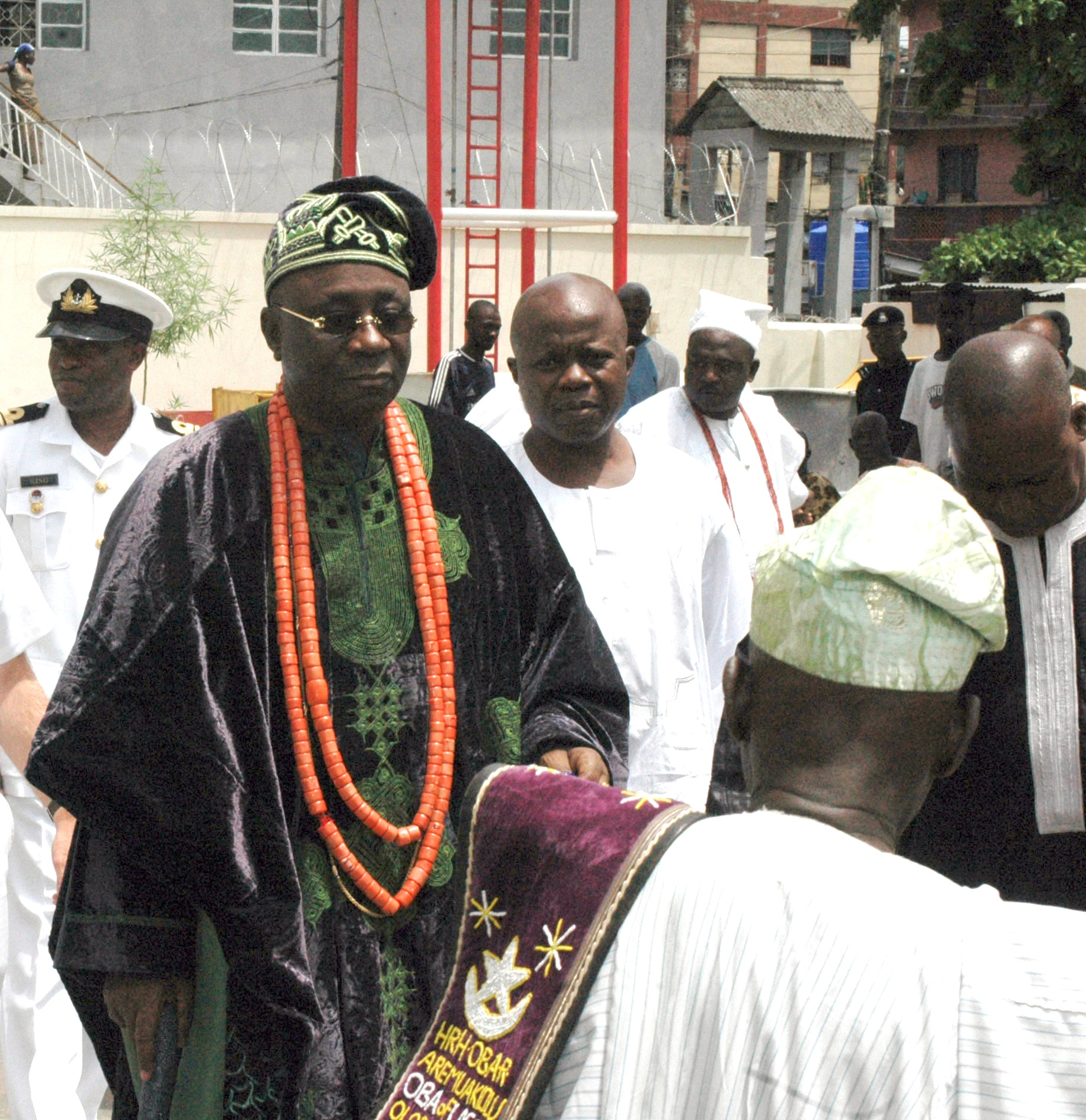
The Oba of Lagos with a delegation of Naval Officers in June 2006

With independence in 1960, followed by alternating democratic and military governments, the status of the traditional rulers evolved even further. In the north, the emirs finally lost power to the government administration, though said administration was often staffed by traditional notables. Where rulers had previously acquired office strictly through inheritance or through appointment by a council of elders, the government now increasingly became involved in the succession.

In some cases, the government merged or split traditional domains. For example, there had been two rulers of the Efik people in the area around Calabar, but in December 1970 it was agreed to combine the office into a single one that was to be held by a ruler known as the Obong. When Yobe State was created there were just four emirates, but in January 2000 the state governor Bukar Abba Ibrahim restructured the state into 13. The government has maintained colonial classifications. Thus when Kwara State governor Bukola Saraki appointed three new monarchs in August 2010, the new Emir of Kaiama was designated a first class traditional ruler while the Onigosun of Igosun and Alaran of Aran-Orin were designated third class monarchs.

Traditional rulers today are still highly respected in many communities, and have considerable cultural, political and economic influence.

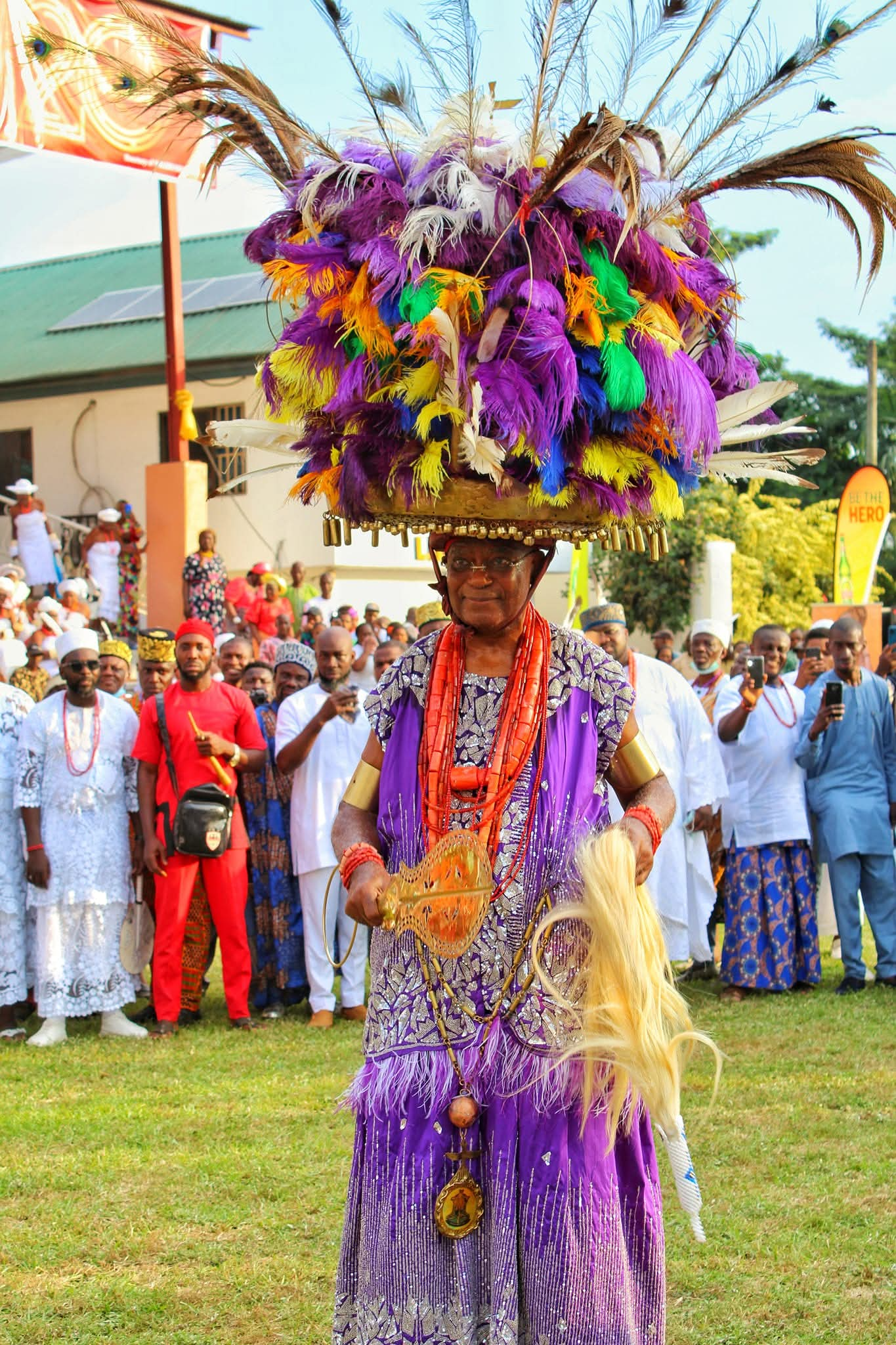
The Obi of Onitsha dancing during an Ofala festival

In the Onitsha Kingdom, for example, His Majesty, Nnaemeka A. Achebe, Obi of Onitsha (Agbogidi), the traditional King, strives to preserve the cultural heritage by promoting and supporting the Ofala festival each year, a colorful week-long event that displays the unity, vigour, strength, resilience and pride of the kingdom.

Although they have no formal role in the democratic structure, there is intense competition for royal seats amongst the finite pool of eligible dynasts. The rulers can also award traditional or honorary titles within the Nigerian chieftaincy system. These titles come with ex officio positions in their "administrations", and wealthy businessmen and politicians often place great value in acquiring such titles.

The rulers play useful roles in mediating between the people and the state, enhancing national identity, resolving minor conflicts and providing an institutional safety-valve for often inadequate state bureaucracies. One reason for their influence may be that the people of many ethnic groups have limited ability to communicate in the official English language, so the traditional ruler serves as an interpreter and spokesperson. By June 2010, Akwa Ibom State had 116 traditional rulers with official certificates from the state. They had received new cars on their appointment, among other perks. The chairman of the Akwa Ibom Council of Chiefs said that in return, the traditional fathers were responsible for preventing robberies and kidnappings in their domains.

== Titles ==
As there are over 525 different native languages in Nigeria, there are many titles for traditional rulers.

In the northern Muslim states, Emir is commonly used in the English language, but names in the local languages include Sarki, Shehu, Mai, Etsu and Lamido.

In the Middle Belt of Nigeria, different titles are held. An example is the Agụma, a title of the traditional ruler of the Bassa people, Aku Uka of the Kwararafa kingdom, traditional ruler of the Jukun, whose seat is in Wukari, Taraba state. Agwam is used among the Atyap peoples, Kpop among the Ham; Agwom among the Adara, Afizere, Bakulu and Gbong Gwom by the Berom in southern Kaduna State and Plateau State. Tor is used by the Tiv and Oche by the Idoma of Benue State. Long and Ngolong are used by the Goemai and Ngas, respectively, and Ponzhi is used by the Tarok, all of Plateau State.

In Yoruba culture, "Oba" is the title for a king, symbolizing both authority and cultural heritage. Obas are traditional rulers presiding over specific towns or regions in Yorubaland, which spans parts of southwestern Nigeria and neighboring areas. Each town typically has its own Oba, who serves as the community's spiritual, cultural, and political leader. The position is hereditary, with responsibilities that include preserving customs, resolving disputes, and maintaining peace. Renowned Obas, such as the Ooni of Ife and the Alaafin of Oyo, hold particular historical and spiritual significance, connecting the Yoruba people to their rich ancestral lineage.

Oba is also used to refer to the Benin Kingdom's paramount ruler in Edo State. Enogie (plural enigie) and Okao (plural ikao) are ascribed to his dukes and viceroys within the Benin Kingdom, while Odionwere is ascribed to his governors or senior elders. In practice, enigie are not installed in communities with ikao, as they are both traditional rulers and representatives of the Oba, charged with the administration of their respective communities

Onojie is used by the Esan peoples to refer to their various rulers in Edo State, while the Afamai people use Otaru and Okwokpellagbe. Other titles are also used.

The Itsekiri people of Warri Kingdom address their traditional ruler with the Olu of Warri title.

Among the Urhobos and Isokos of Delta State, the general title used is Ovie. Some clans use related titles however, such as Orodje, Orosuen, Ohworode, Odion-Ologbo, and Odio r'Ode.

Obong is likewise used by the Efik, Ibibio and Annang peoples of Cross River and Akwa Ibom States.

Among the Igbo people in the South-East, Eze, Igwe and Obi are typically used to denote rulers.

In Onitsha the traditional ruler is referred to as Obi, Obi-Igwe, Agbogidi, Agu neche mba, Okwue Obe-e, Onye nwe Obodo, Onyimonyi, Aka Enyi ka Ol'ukwu Ya, among other royal titles.

The Ijaws, an ethnic group of the Niger Delta, refer to their kings by a variety of titles; Pere, Obanema, Mingi, Obanobhan, Ibenanaowei or Amanyanabo.

Among the Eleme people of Rivers State in the South-South, the king is sometimes referred to as an Emere but is also otherwise known as an Oneh Eh Eleme. Other titles include Oneh Eh Nchia, Oneh Eh Odido, and Oneh Eh Eta.

The Ikwerre people of Rivers State in the South-South, the king is referred to as the Nye-we-ali

== Gallery ==
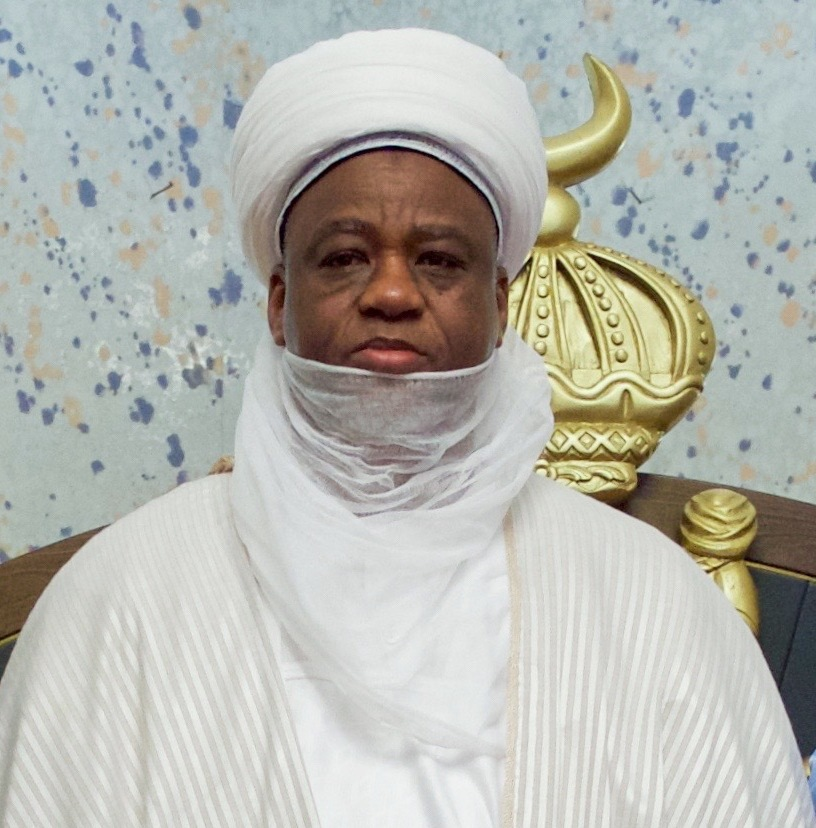
Sa'adu Abubakar, Sultan of Sokoto and Sarkin Musulmi of Nigeria, current co-chair of the National Council of Traditional Rulers

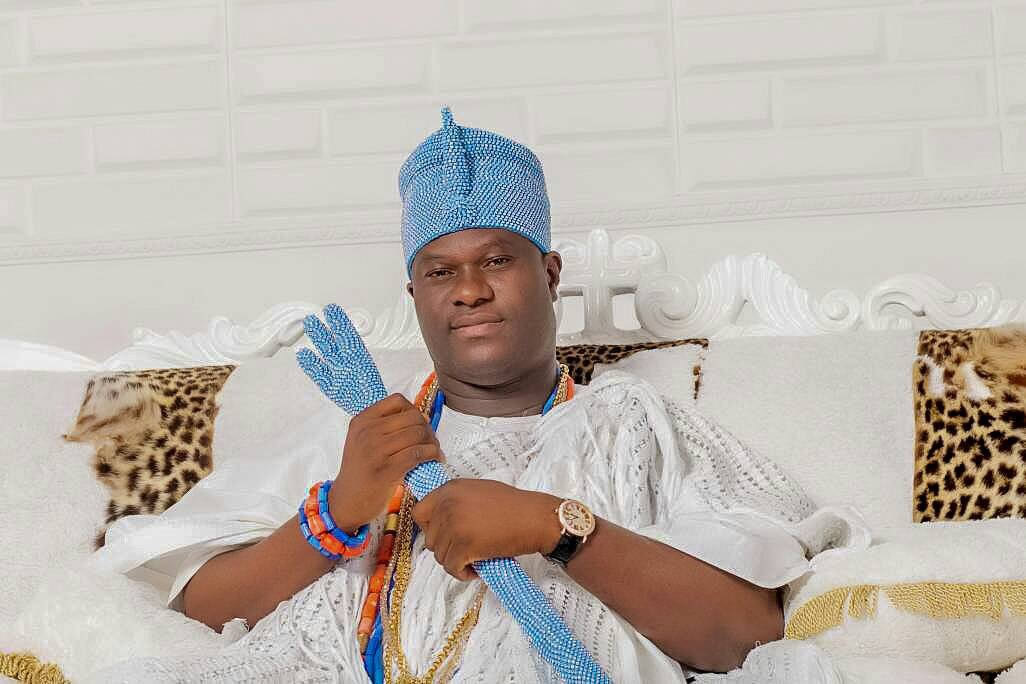
Adeyeye Enitan Ogunwusi, Ooni of Ife, current co-chair of the National Council of Traditional Rulers

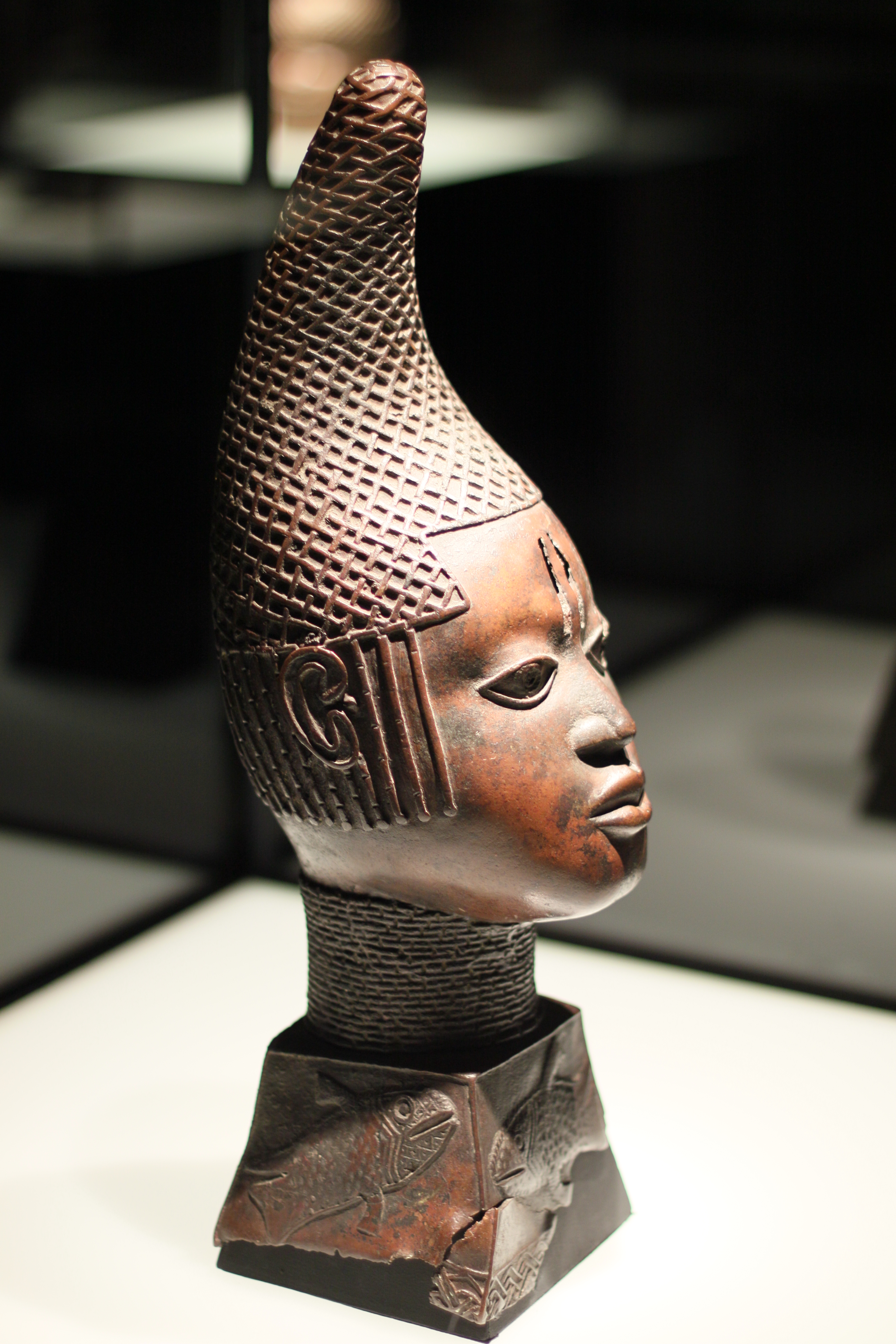
Idia, Queen Mother of Benin

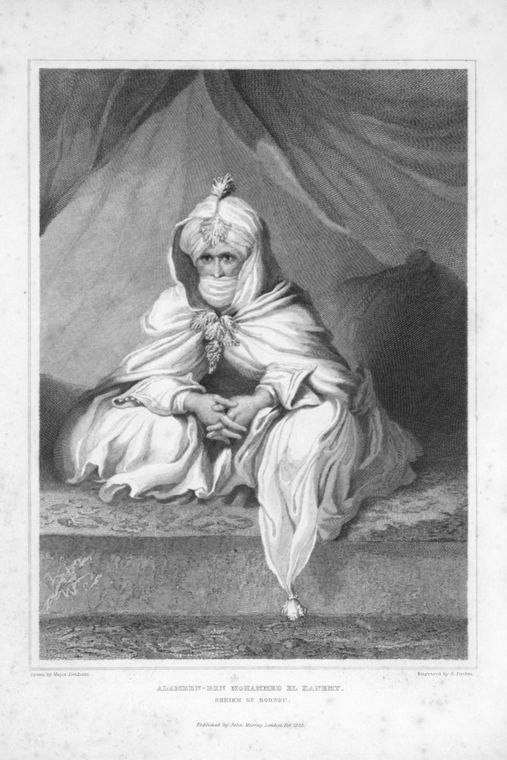
Muhammad al-Amin al-Kanemi, Shehu of Borno

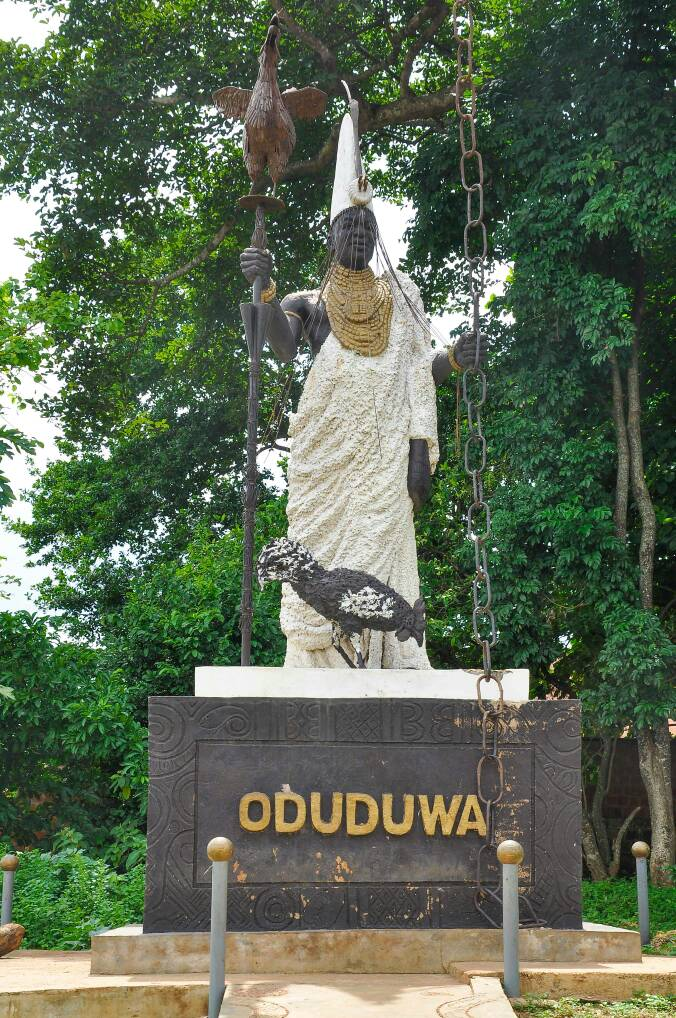
Oduduwa, Ooni of Ife

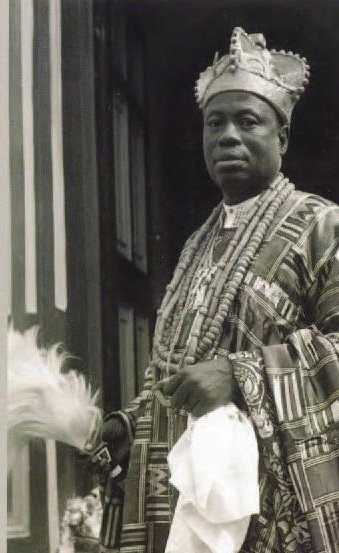
Sir Adeniji Adele K.B.E., Oba of Lagos

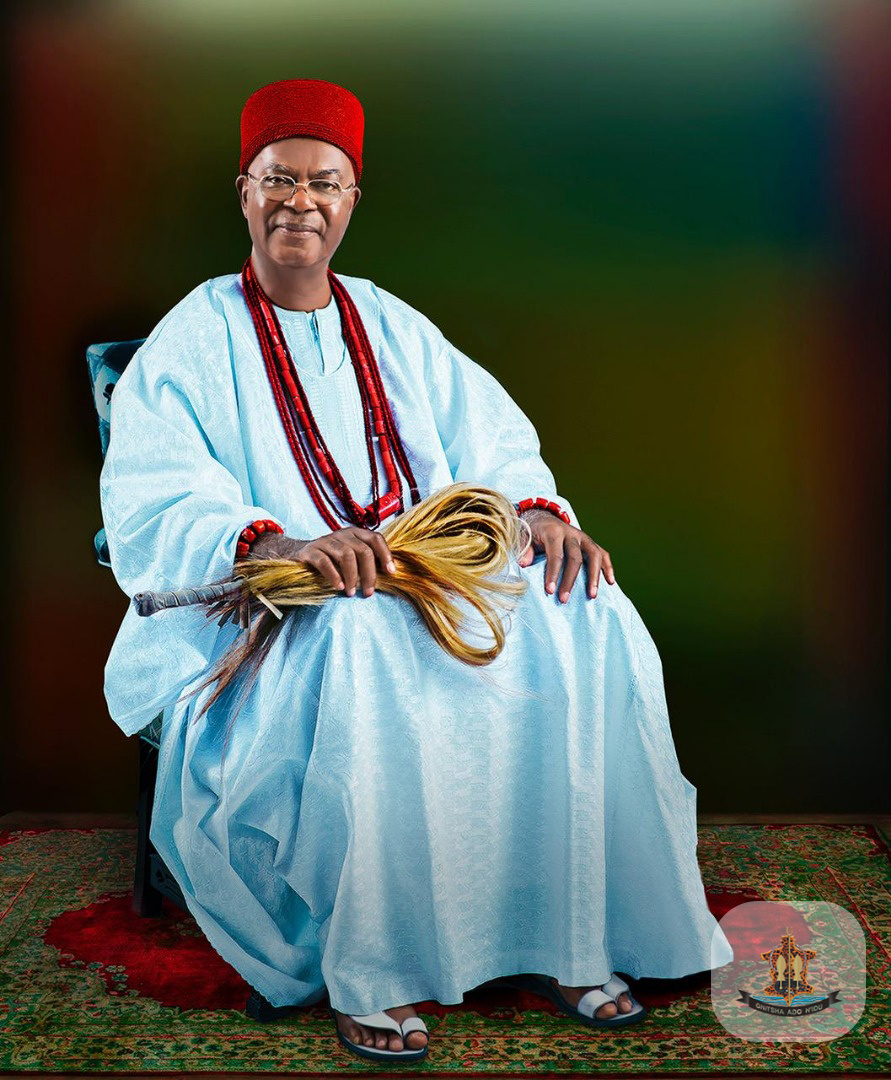
Alfred Achebe, Obi of Onitsha

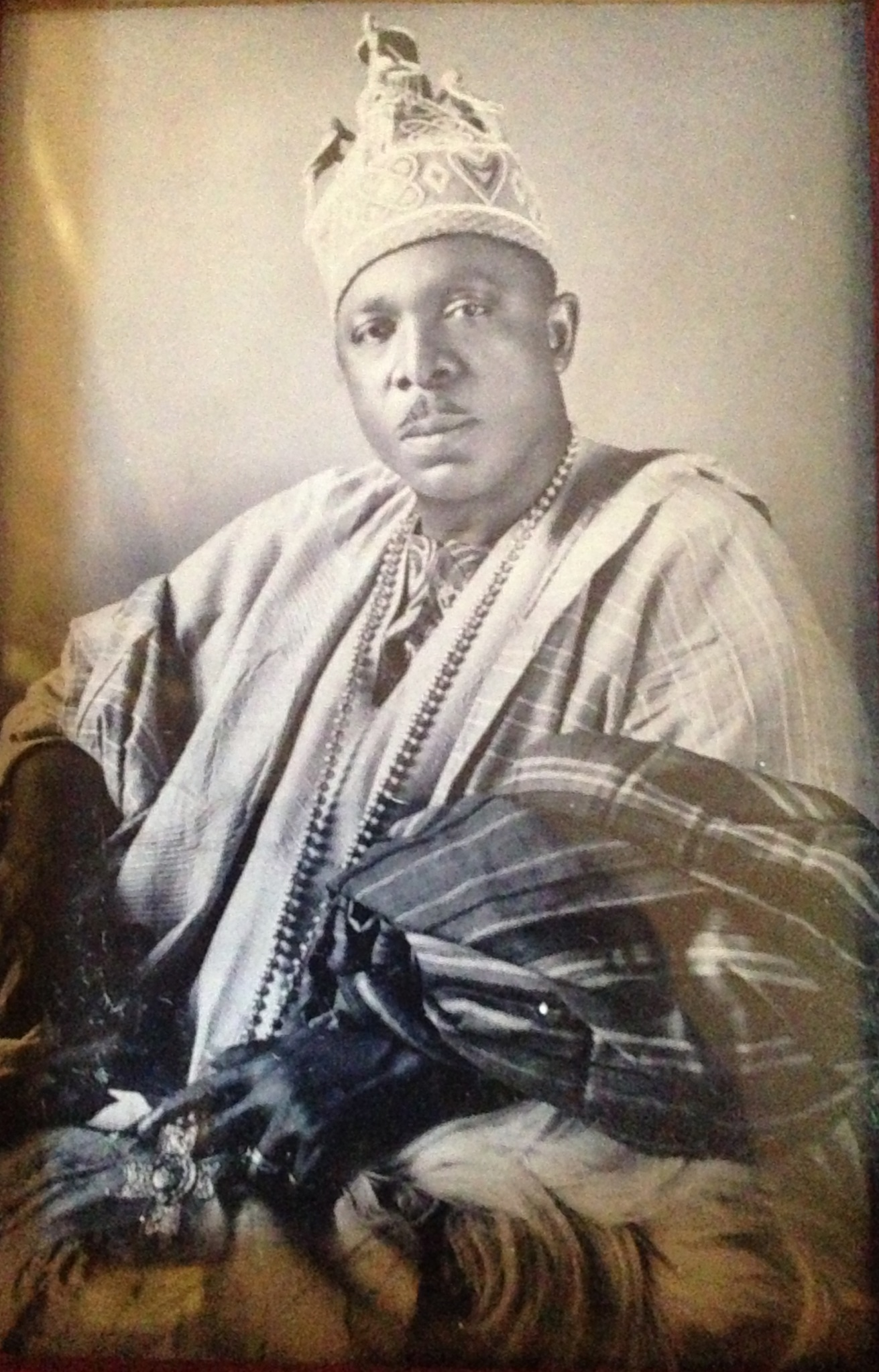
Samuel Akisanya, Odemo of Isara

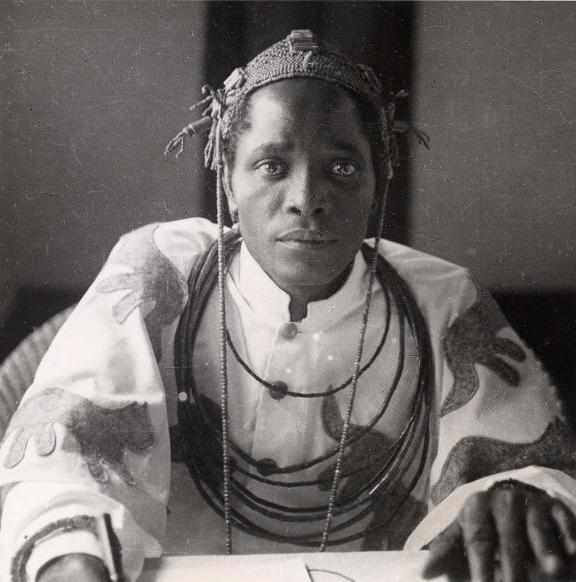
Akenzua II, Oba of Benin

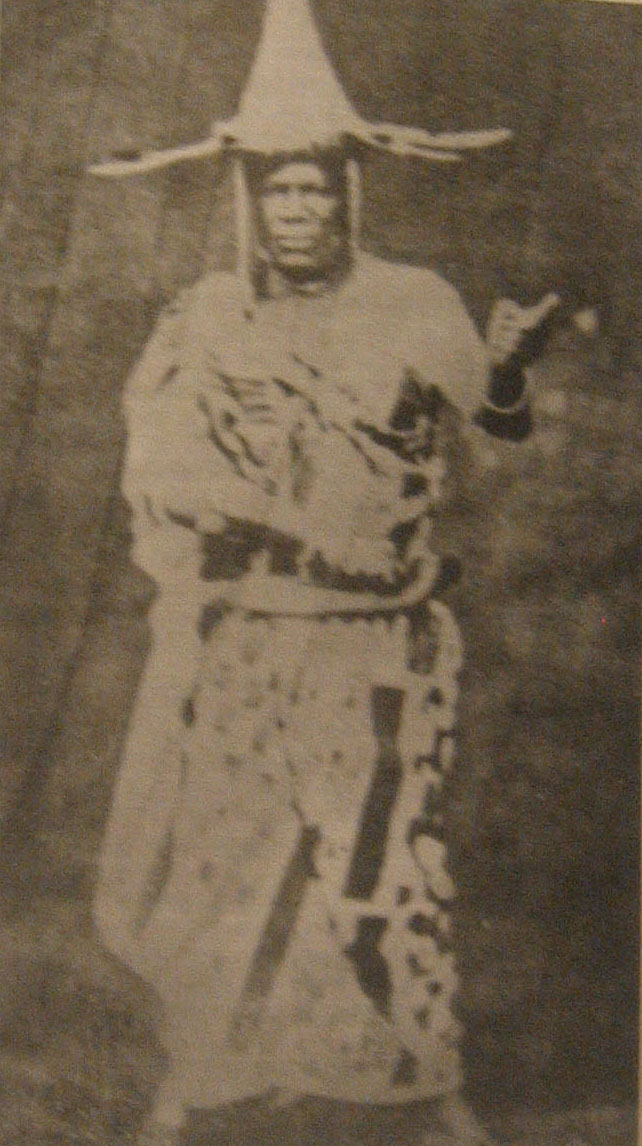
Jaja, Amanyanabo of Opobo

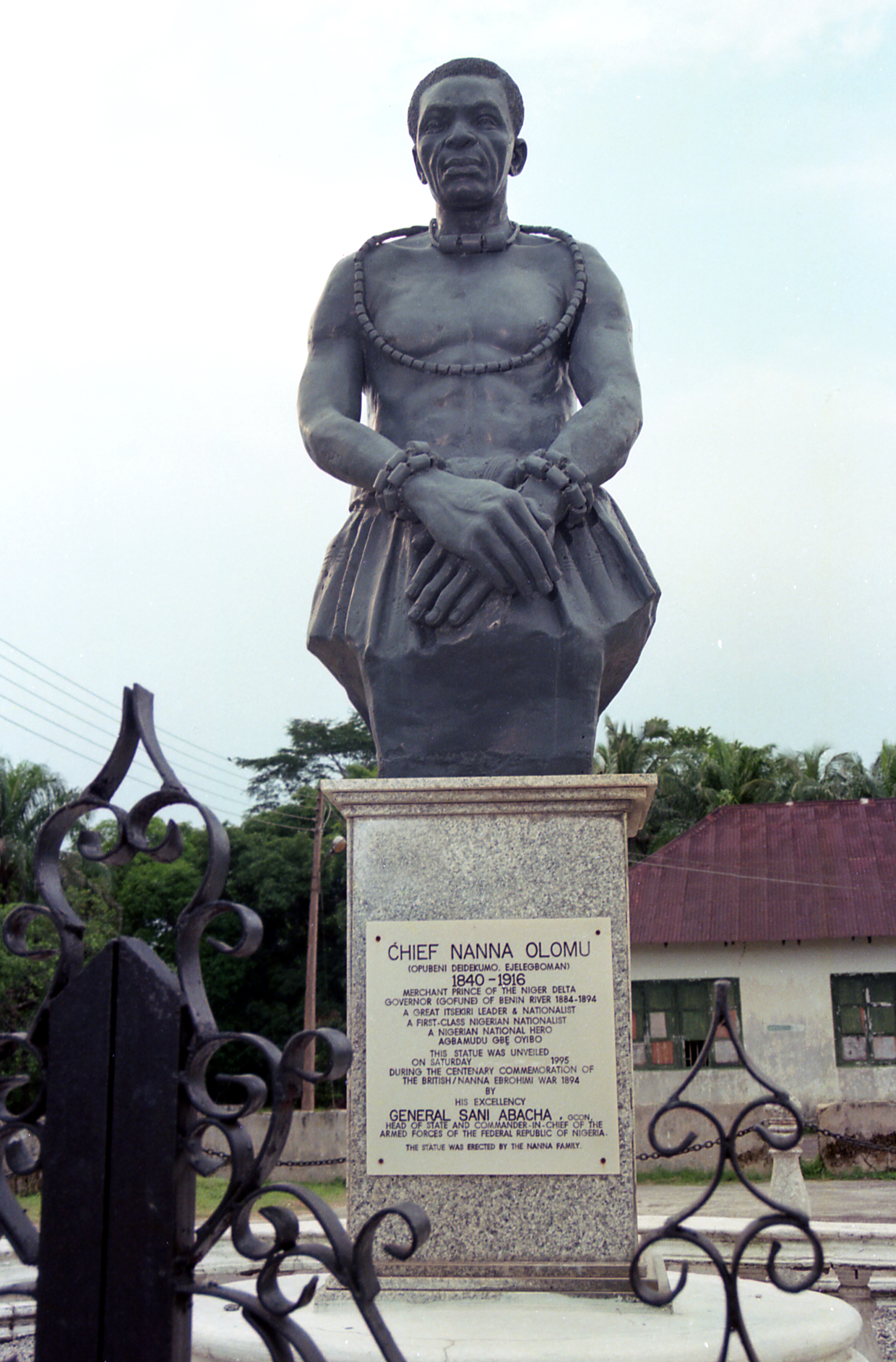
Nana Olomu, Paramount Chief of the Itsekiri

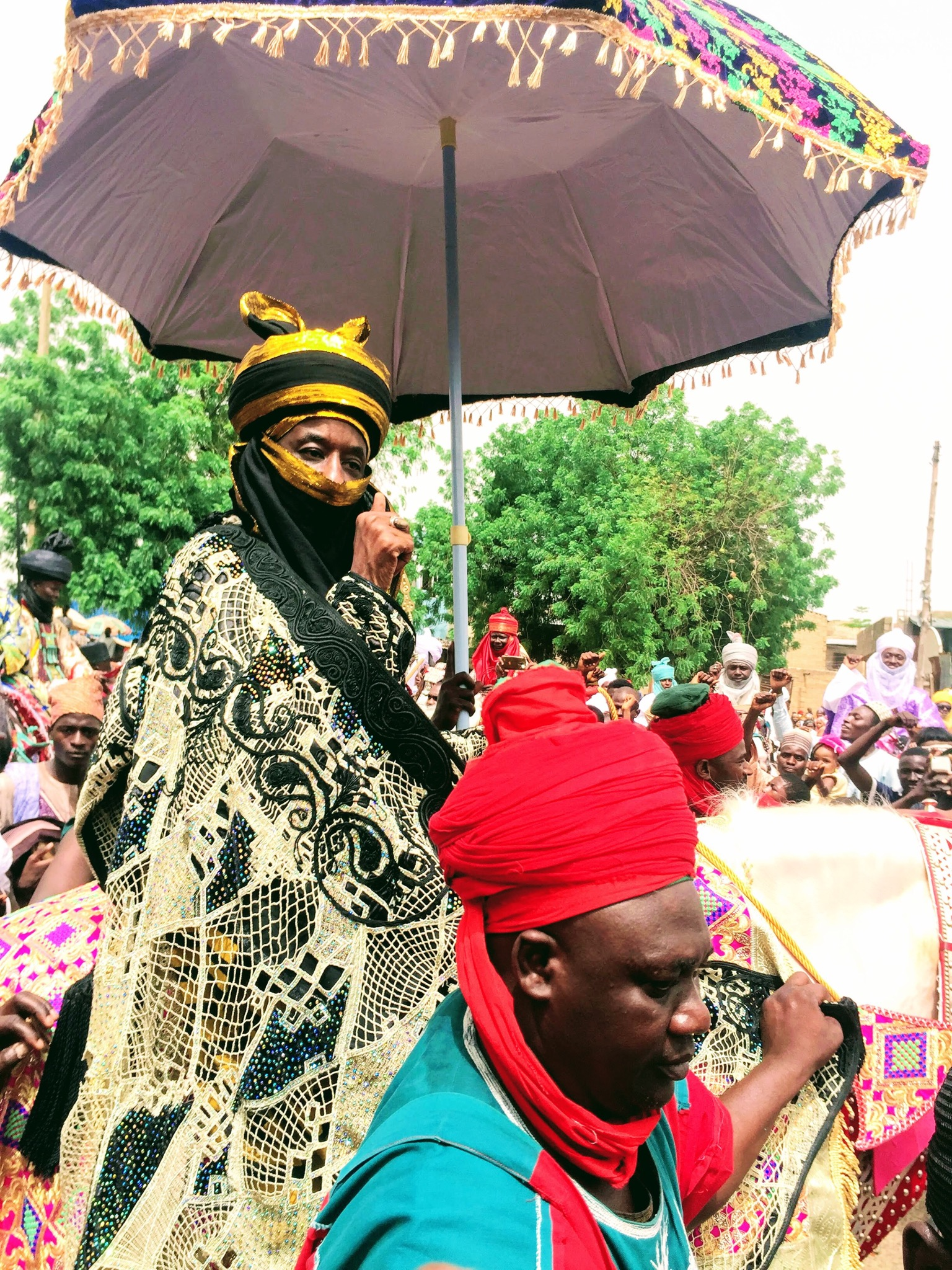
Muhammadu Sanusi II, Emir of Kano

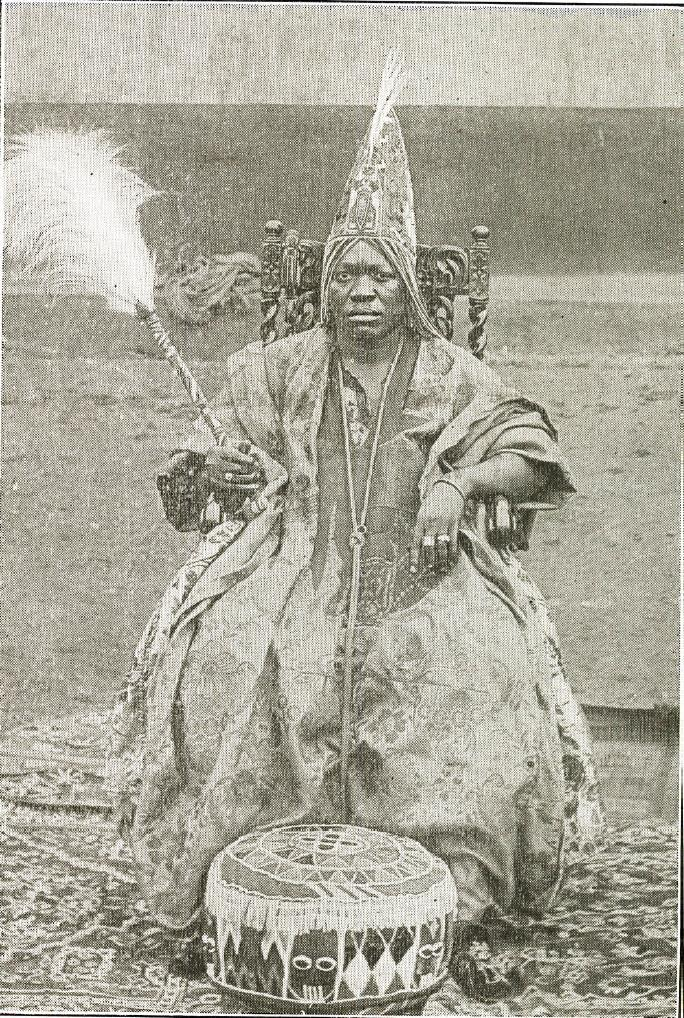
Sir Adesoji Aderemi K.C.M.G., Ooni of Ife

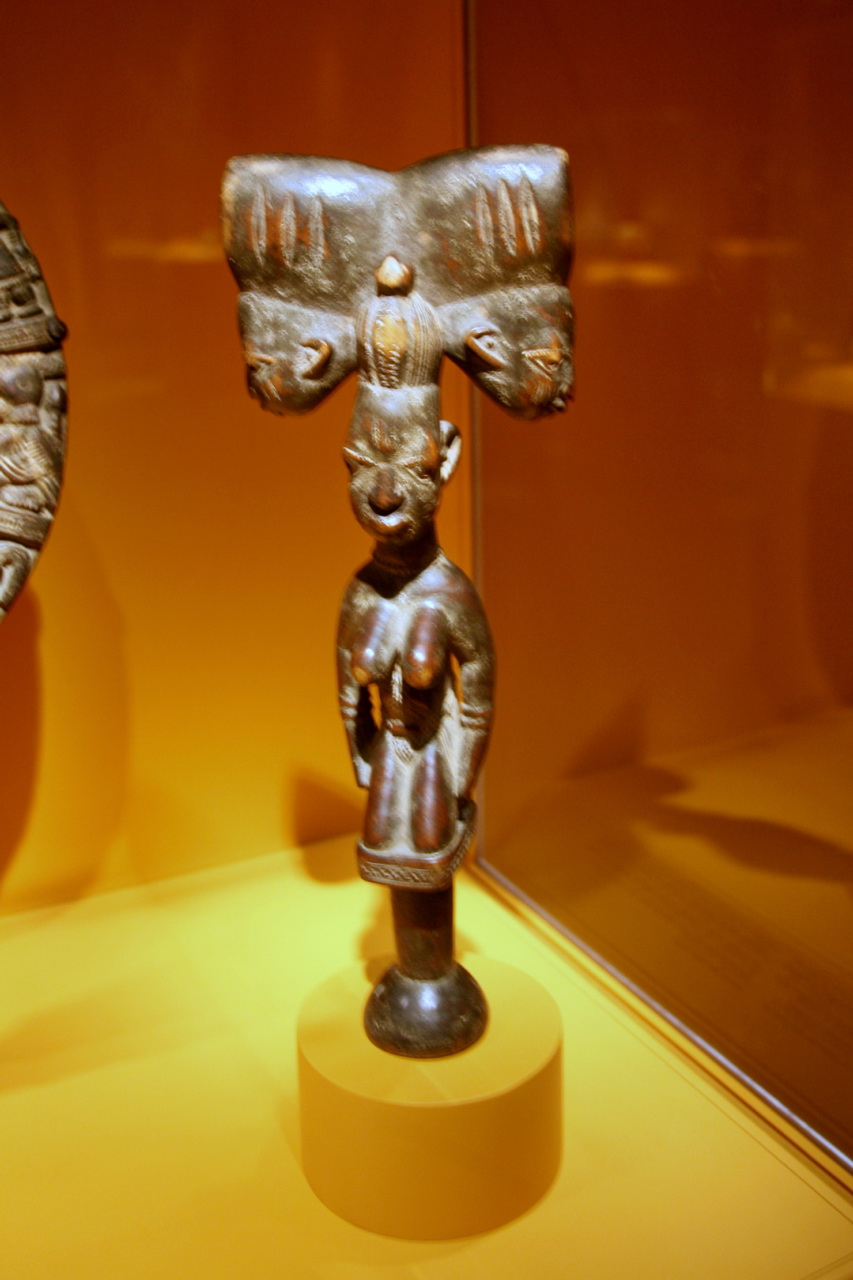
Shango, Alaafin of Oyo

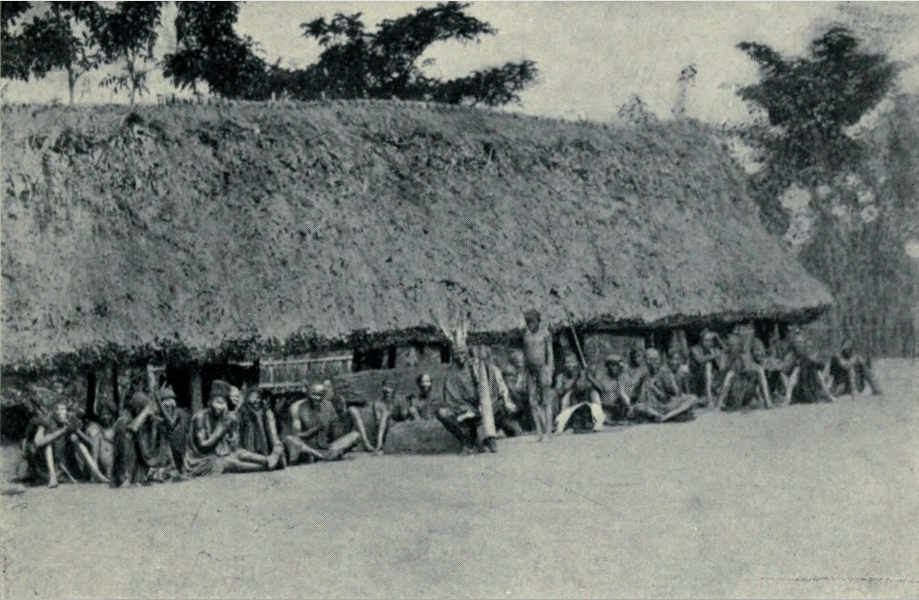
Obalike, Eze Nri of Nri (ringing the royal bell)

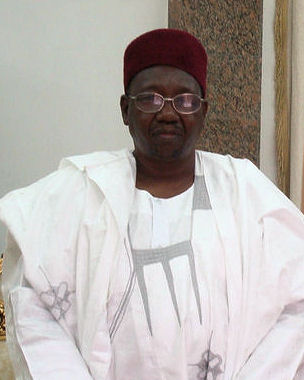
Abubakar Ibn Umar Garbai El-Kanemi, Shehu of Borno

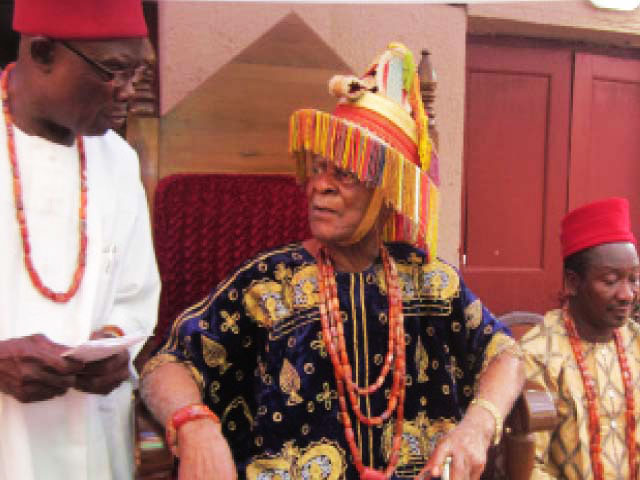
Orizu III, Igwe of Nnewi (with the elaborate headress)

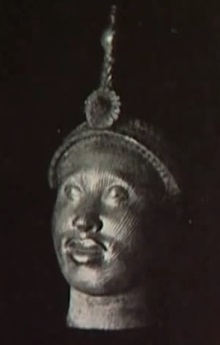
Olokun, Queen Consort of Ife

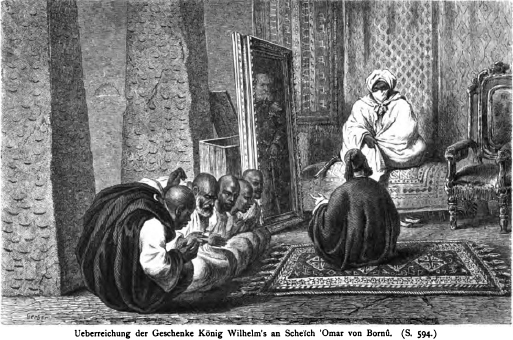
Umar Kura, Shehu of Borno

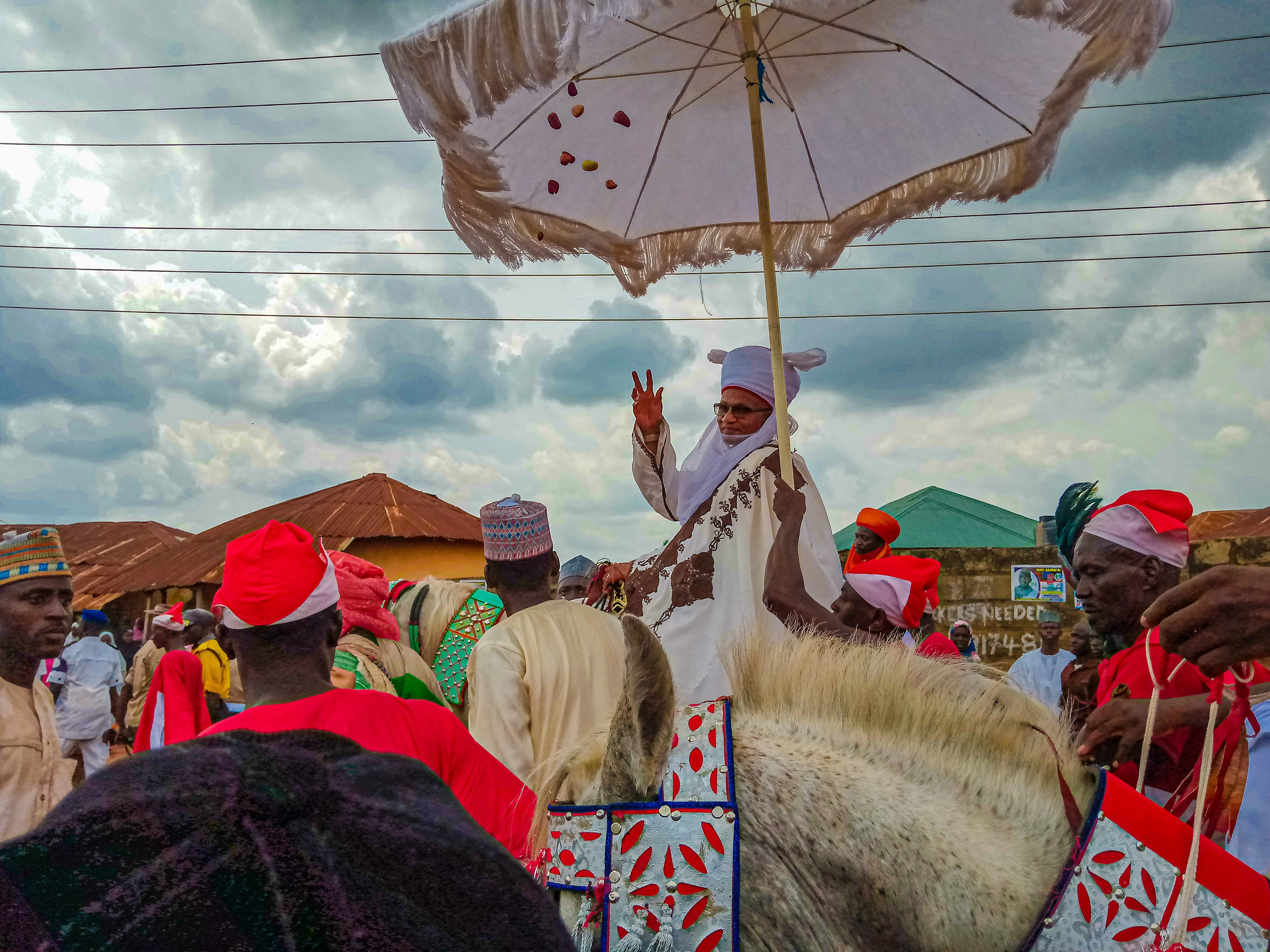
Yahaya Abubakar, Etsu Nupe of Bida

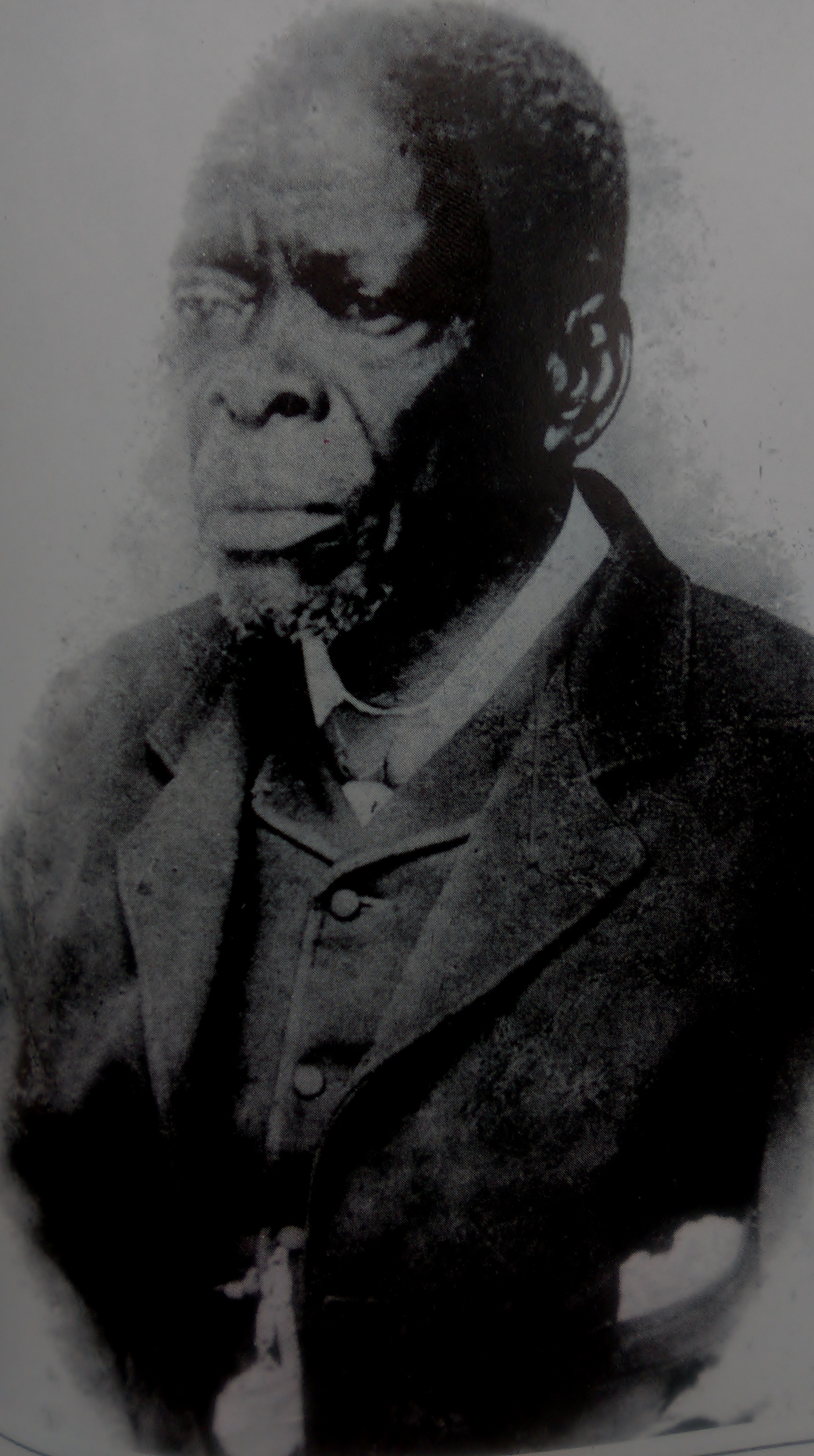
Ajimoko I, Owa of Ijeshaland

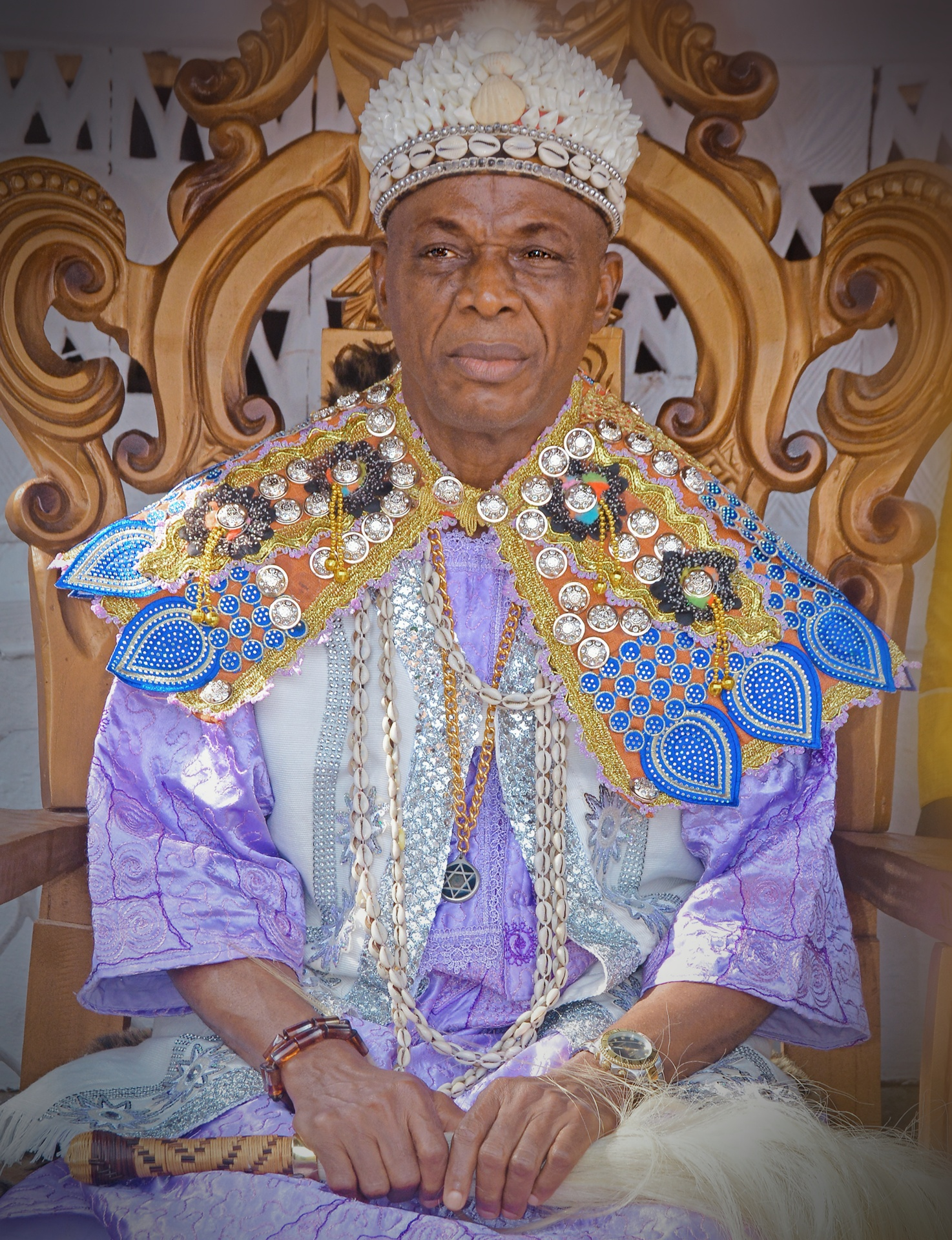
Chukwuemeka Eri, Eze Eri of Aguleri

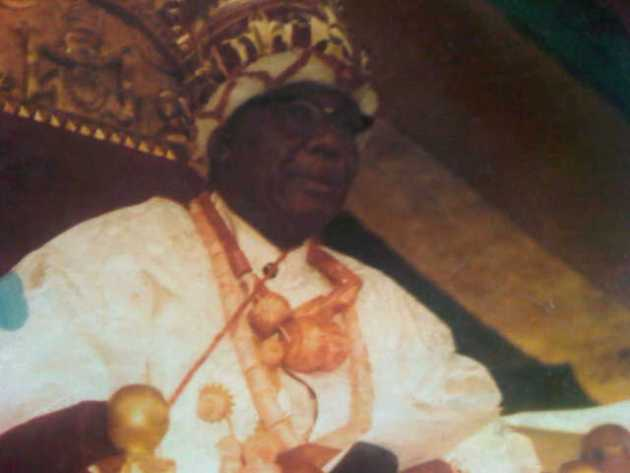
Ezeolisa Allagoa, Amanyanaboh of Nembe

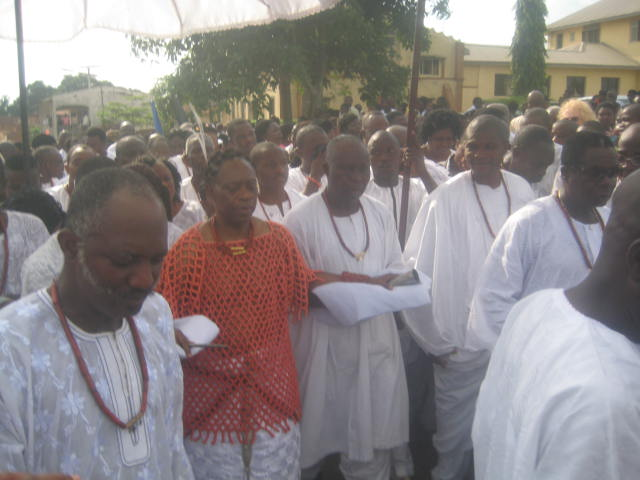
Folagbade Olateru Olagbegi III, Olowo of Owo (in the vest of red coral beads)

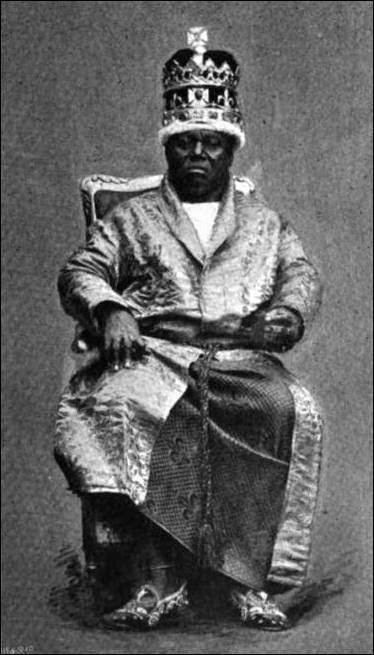
Eyamba IX, Obong of Duke Town

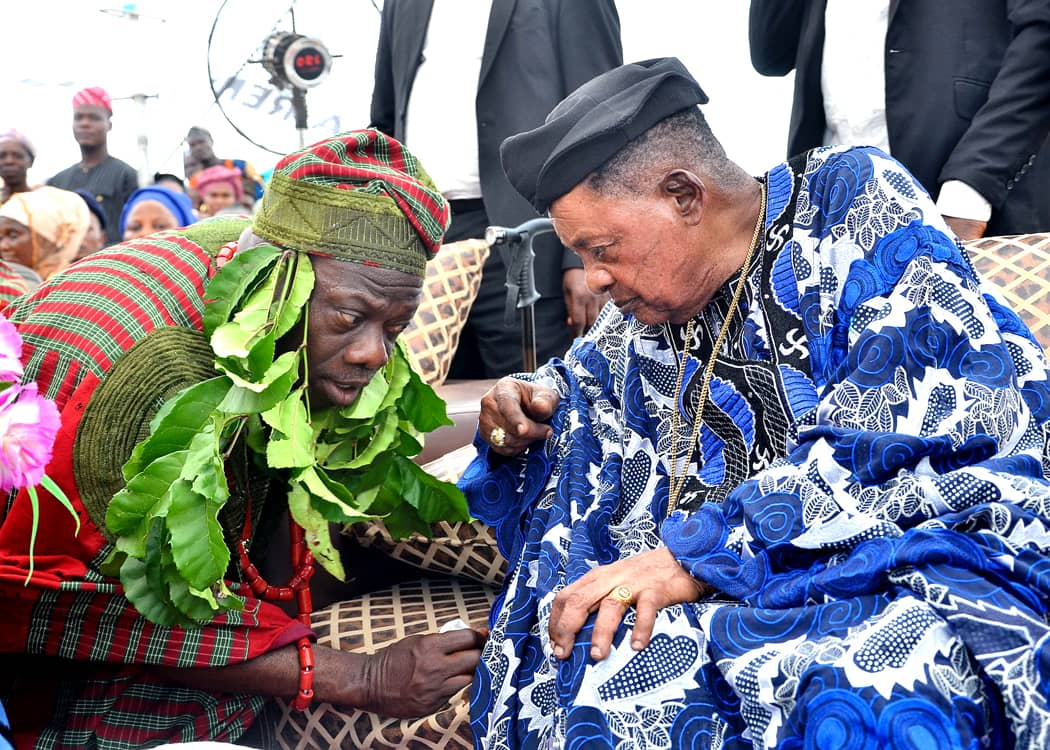
Lamidi Adeyemi, Alaafin of Oyo (on the right) and Jimoh Olajide Titiloye, Olu of Igboora

Ogbidi Okojie, Onojie of Uromi and part of his extensive harem

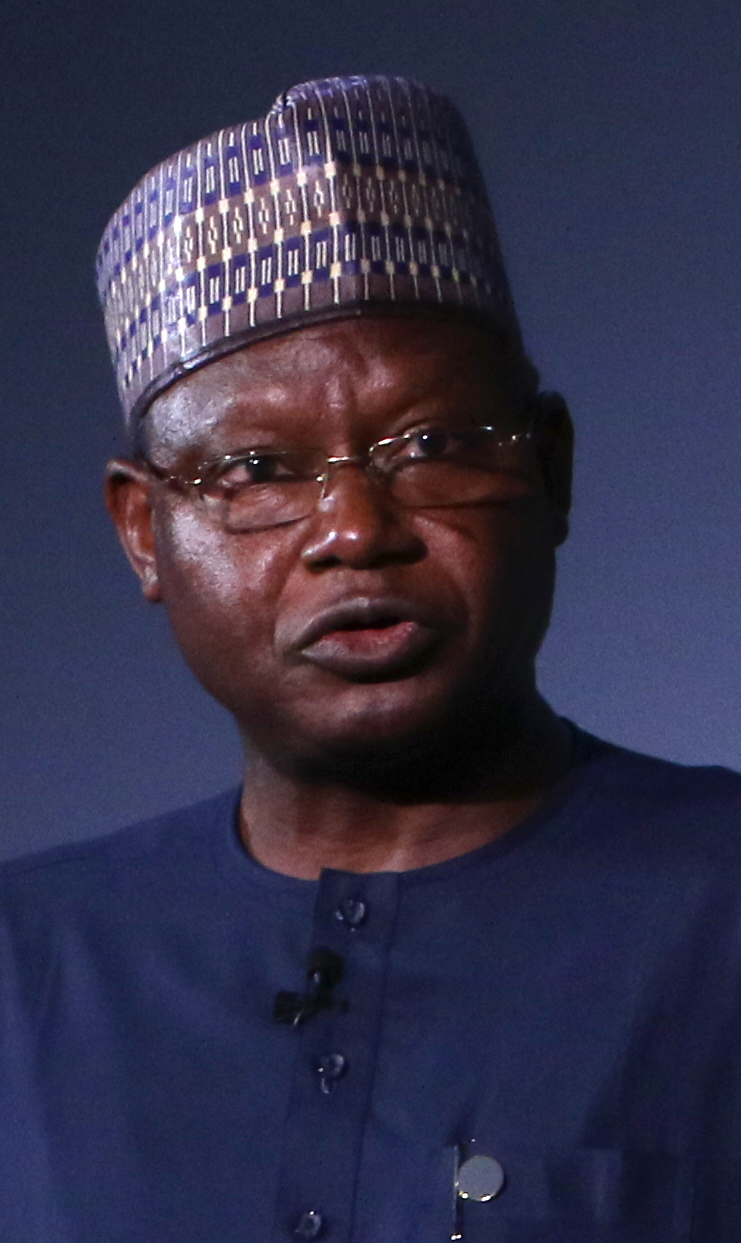
Ibrahim Usman Jibril, Emir of Nasarawa

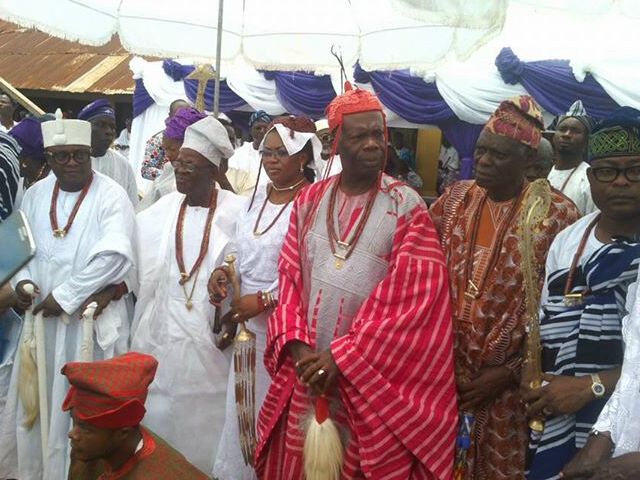
Kofoworola Oladoyinbo Ojomo, Ojomo Oluda of Ijebu, Owo (in red) in the company of some of his fellow chiefs

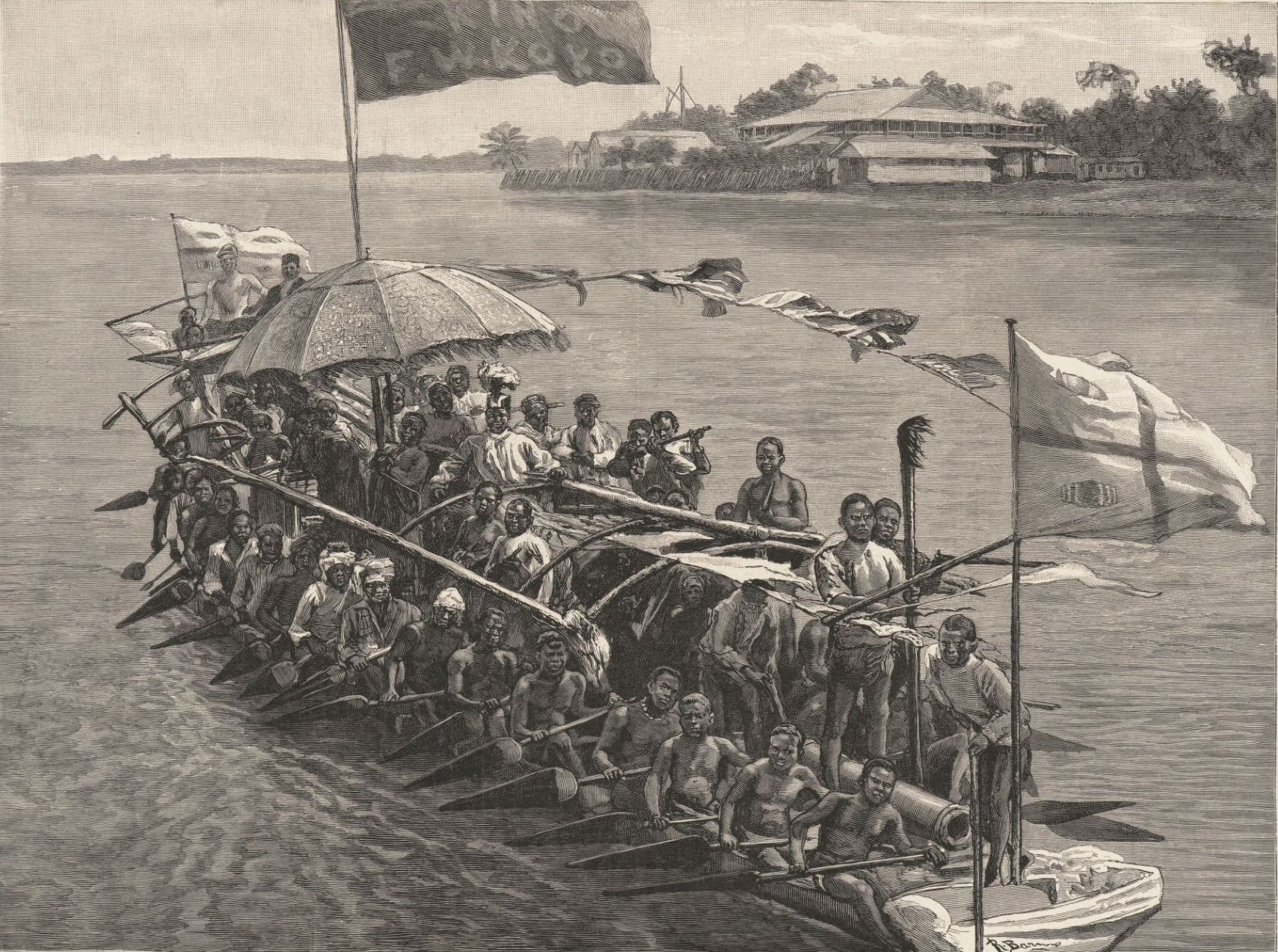
William Koko, Amanyanaboh of Nembe in his war canoe (seated under the umbrella)

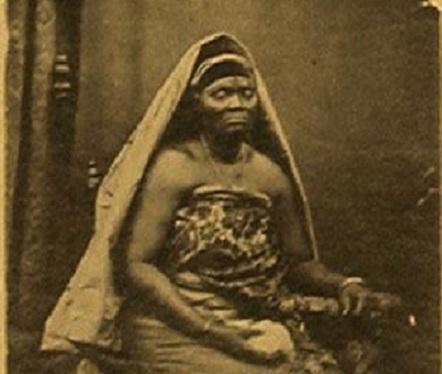
Efunroye Tinubu, Princess Consort to Oba Adele Ajosun of Lagos and Paramount Chieftess of Egbaland

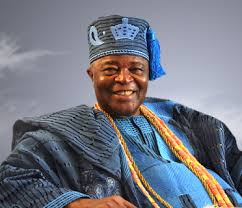
Adedotun Aremu Gbadebo III, Alake of Egbaland

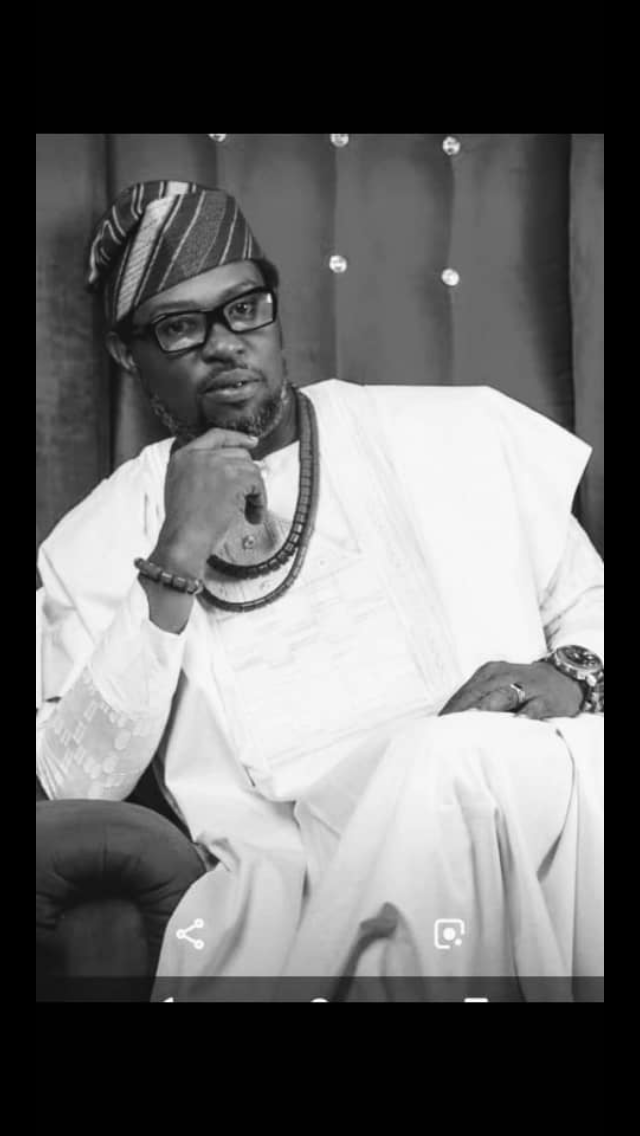
Fusika Adedapo Adeduro, Osemawe of Ondo

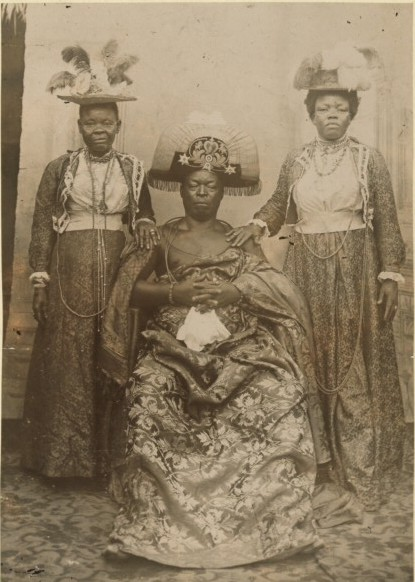
Ovonramwen, Oba of Benin and his wives Queen Egbe (on the left) and Queen Aighobahi (on the right)

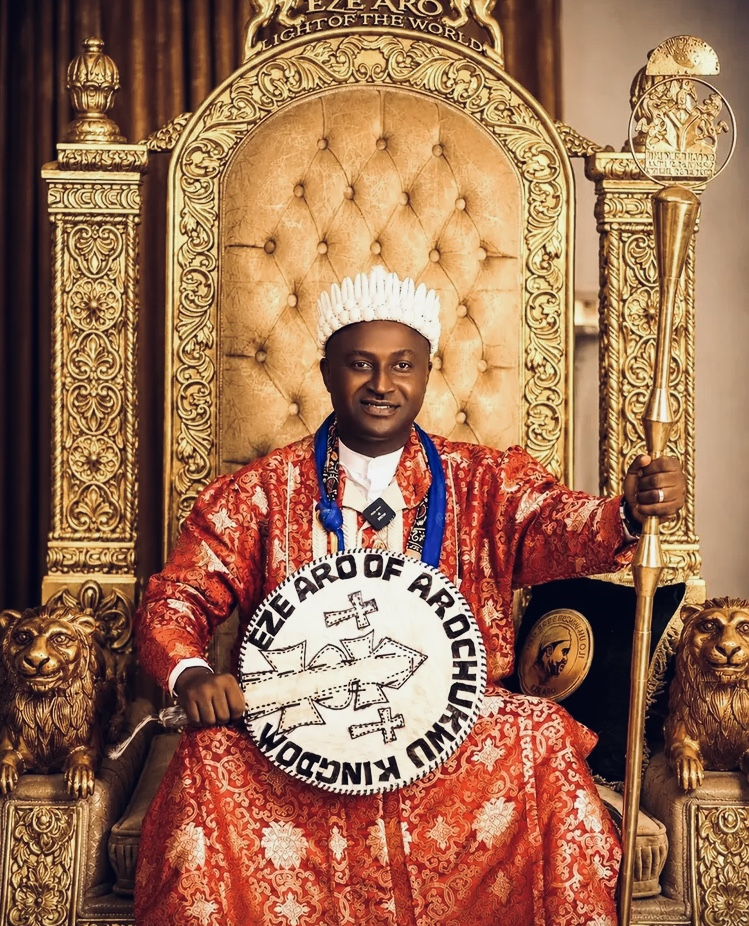
Eze Arochukwu, Mazi Eberechukwu Oji, 9th King of the Aros

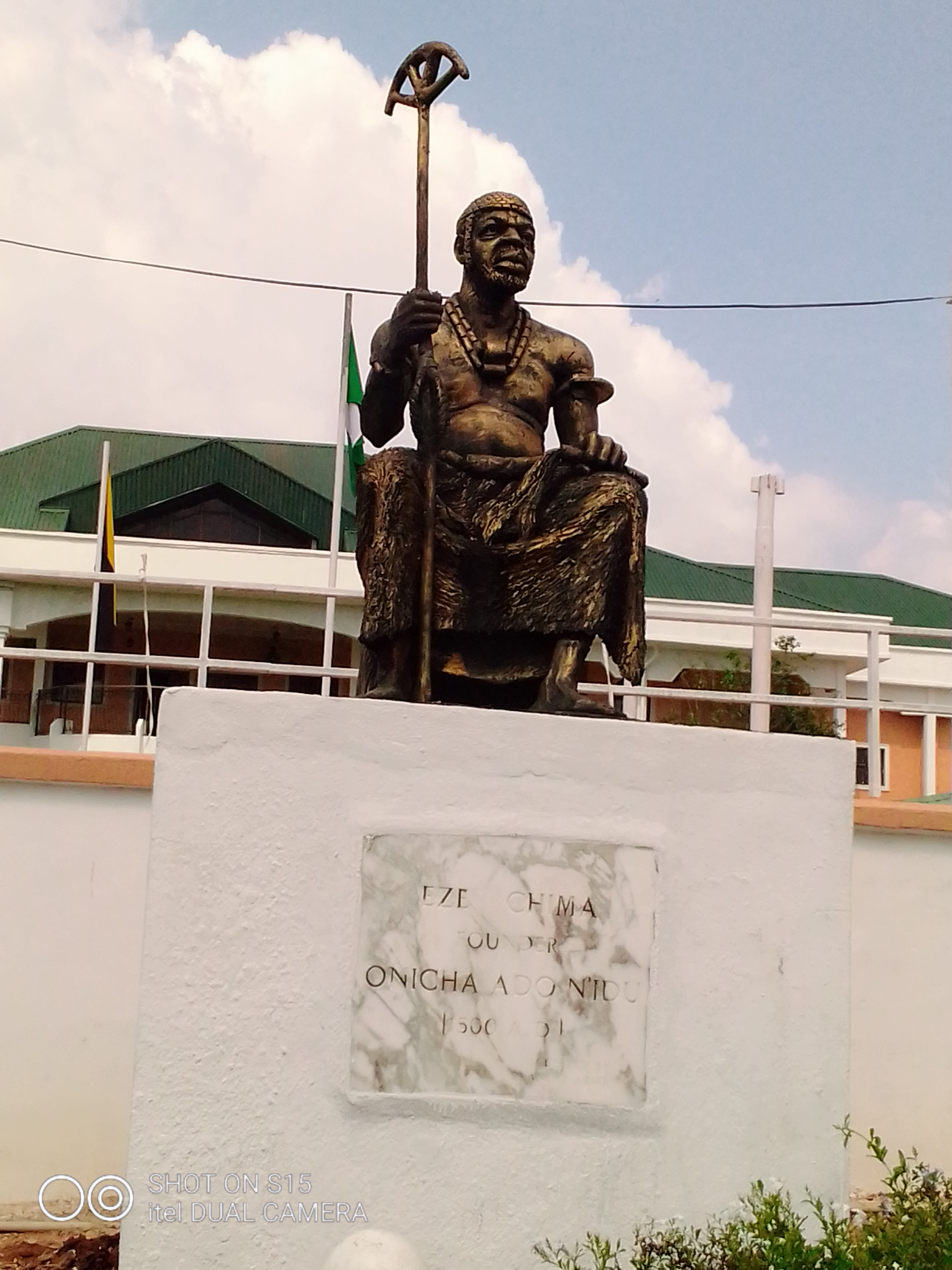
Igbo king, Eze Chima, one of the most important kings and spiritualist in Africa monarch history

== See also ==
- History of Nigeria
- Nigerian chieftaincy
- Nigerian heraldry
- Royal regalia in Nigeria
