= List of people from Onitsha =

The Onitsha people were among the first Igbo to embrace western education, producing notable people like Bishop Alphonsus Chukwuma Onyeabo, Order of the British Empire, 1879–1954, and the main contributor of the English to Igbo bible, Dr. Nnamdi Azikiwe, Owele of Onicha, Zik of Africa, and the first president of the post-independent Nigeria.

- Olisa Agbakoba, lawyer and human rights activist.
- Ukpabi Asika, Nigerian academic and civil servant.
- Flora Azikiwe, first wife of Nnamdi Azikiwe, the first President of Nigeria.
- Onyedika Chuke, Art dealer, Curator, and Artist
- Ben Enwonwu, painter and sculptor
- Obum Gwacham, American football player
- Emmanuel Ifeajuna, a former army major and high jumper - first Black African to win gold at a major international sports competition
- Alex Iwobi, professional footballer, Everton forward.
- Louis Mbanefo, lawyer and justice
- Nwagboka, last Omu of Onitsha.
- Alexander Nwora, basketball player and coach
- Tony Nwoye, Nigerian politician.
- Chike Obi, mathematician
- Francis Obikwelu, retired Nigerian-born Portuguese sprinter.
- Janet Okala, Nigerian political leader.
- Francisca Nneka Okeke, Nigerian physicist.
- Henry Onyekuru, footballer
- Chike, singer, songwriter and actor
