= List of Ahmadu Bello University chancellors =

The Chancellors
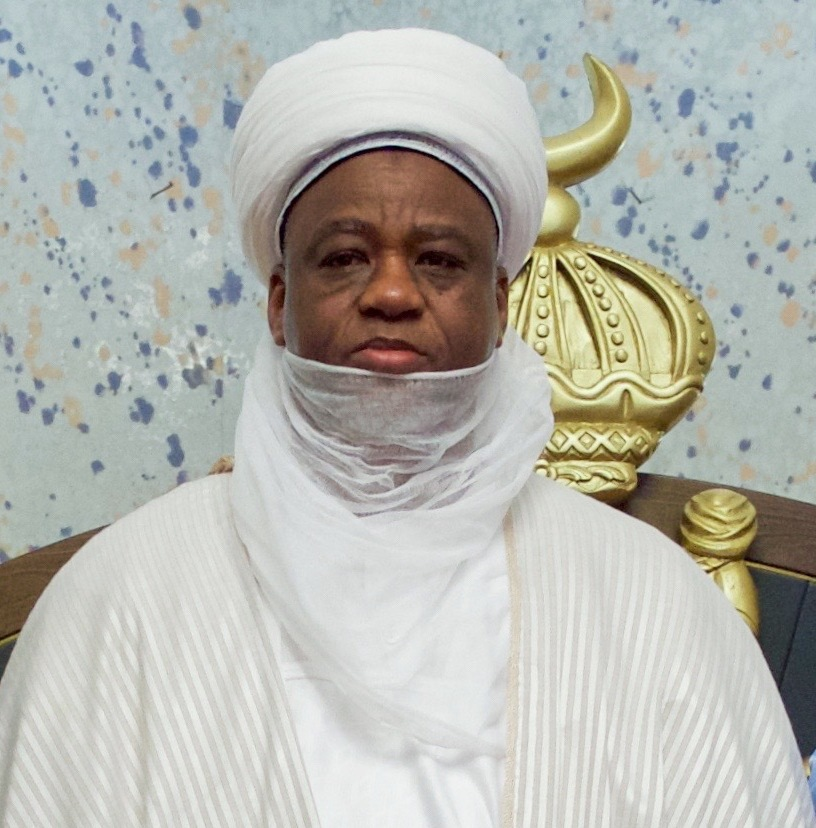
Muhammad Sa'ad Abubakar

This is the list of Ahmadu Bello University chancellors since inception on 4 October 1962. Ahmadu Bello University chancellor is the ceremonial, titular and non-resident head of the university.

S/N	Name	Investiture	Remark
1	Sir, Ahmadu Bello, (KBE), (GCON)	1962 -1966	Sardauna of Sokoto, Premier of Northern Nigeria
2	Oba, Akenzua II	1966–1972	Oba of Benin
3	Sir, Egbert Udo Udoma (KJW)	1972–1975	Former, Chief Justice of Uganda, and justice of the Nigerian Supreme Court
4	Chief, Obafemi Awolowo, (CFR)	1975–1979	Premier of Western Nigeria
5	Barkindo Aliyu Musdapha, (CFR)	1979–2010	Lamido of Adamawa
6	Muhammad Sa'ad Abubakar, (CFR), (mni)	2010–2015	Sultan of Sokoto
7	Igwe, Nnaemeka A. U. Achebe, (CFR), (mni)	2015–	Obi of Onitsha
