= Otu odu Society =

Association of Igbo women in Anambra, Nigeria

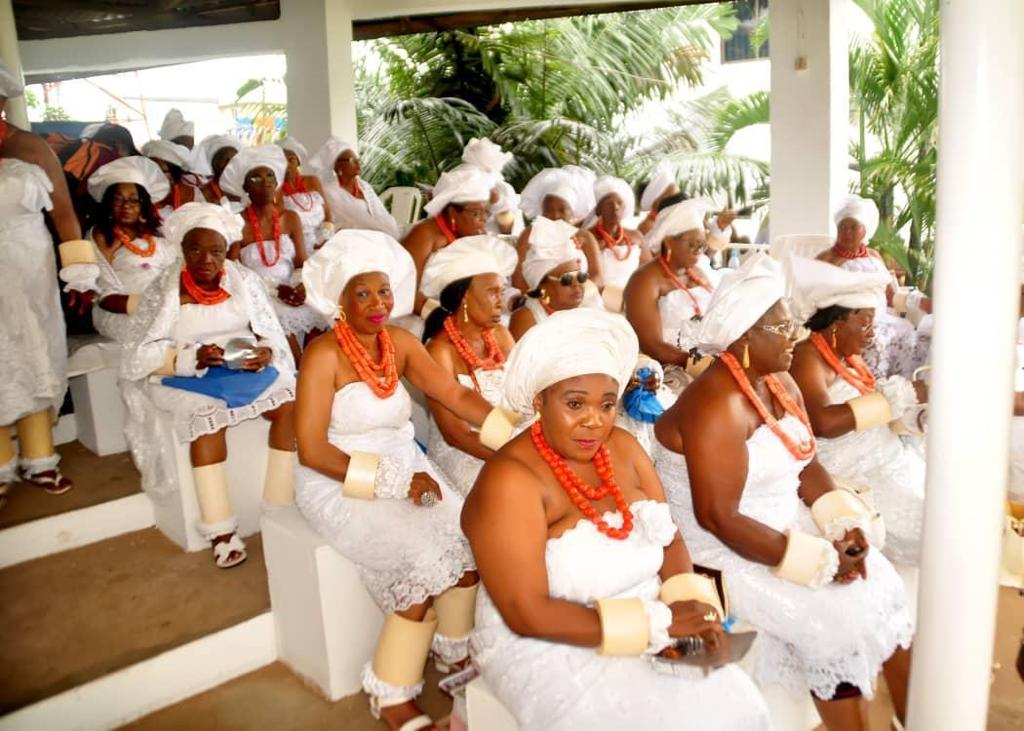
Otu odu women at the ofala ceremony. (2026)

The Otu Odu also known as the Ivory Association is a prestigious institution of titled Igbo women in the traditional kingdom of Onitsha, in present-day Anambra State, Nigeria. Closely linked to the office of the Omu (Queen Mother) Onitsha, the society formed part of the system through which women participated in the political, social, and economic life of the kingdom.

Women who belong to the society are known as Ndi Odu and hold the title Iyom. Membership is regarded as one of the highest honours available to women in Onitsha and symbolised leadership, achievement, and public respect.

== Background ==
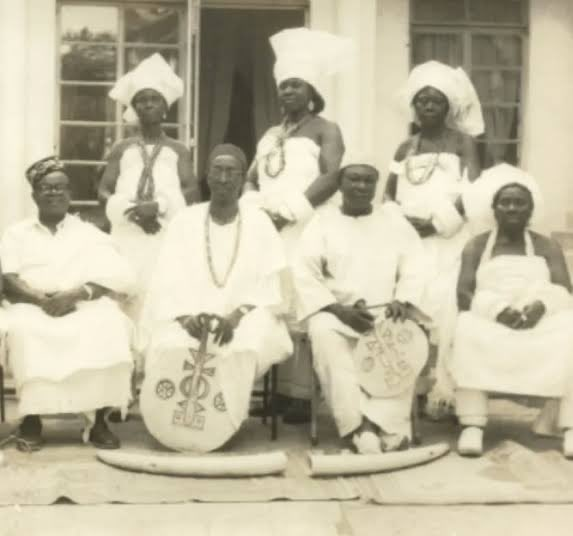
Ndi Odu seated with the Obi of Onitsha 1935.

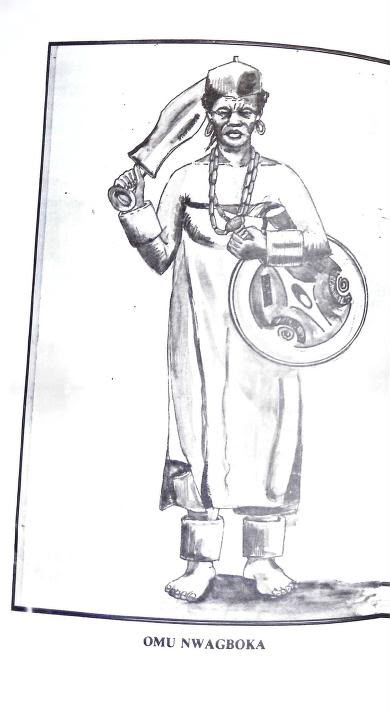
Omu Nwagboka, last Official Omu (Queen Mother) of Onitsha, 1844-1890

Traditional Onitsha society maintained separate but complementary institutions for men and women. While the Obi and his council led the affairs of the kingdom, women were represented by the Omu, the highest-ranking female leader.

The Omu oversaw women’s affairs, supervised markets, settled disputes involving women, and worked with a council of female chiefs. The Otu Odu was one of the most important institutions within this system. Through it, distinguished women gained recognition and played active roles in community life.

Historical accounts describe the Omu as an important member of the traditional government who represented women’s interests in public affairs. Many influential women in Onitsha were members of Otu Odu, making the society closely associated with female leadership in the kingdom.

== Role in Onitsha society ==
The Otu Odu occupied a respected position in traditional Onitsha society. According to Nigerian newspaper The Guardian, it is one of the four major institutions of the kingdom and functions as an elite socio-political and economic organisation for women.

Membership recognises a woman’s character, achievements, and contribution to her community. Members take part in important ceremonies, communal activities, and public events, and are regarded as examples of honour and dignity.

The society also reflects the important role women play in the governance and social organisation of Onitsha. Through the Omu, female chiefs, market leaders, and titled women, women maintained their own sphere of authority within the kingdom.

== Membership and initiation ==
Admission into the Otu Odu Society takes place through a formal initiation ceremony known as Ikwo Aka Odu. Candidates are expected to be women of good character and respected standing within the community. After initiation, members become known as Ndi odu and receive the title Iyom. Membership brought prestige and public recognition and marked a woman's acceptance into one of the most respected institutions

== Regalia and symbols ==
Members of the Otu Odu Society were traditionally identified by ivory ornaments known as odu, worn on the wrists and ankles. These ornaments symbolised honour, nobility, and social distinction.

During ceremonies and public events, members often wear white pair of wrappers called Akwaocha and white headties known as Ichafu in Igbo usage. The ivory ornaments which also include elephant tusks are known as odu enyi. This is usually held at the hand with horstail whisks (Nza). These items serve as visible symbols of membership in the society and the status associated with it.

== Legacy ==
The Otu Odu remains one of the best-known institutions associated with women’s leadership in Onitsha history. Alongside the office of the Omu, it reflects the influential role women played in the political, economic, and ceremonial life of the kingdom.

The titles, traditions, and symbols associated with the society continue to be remembered as important aspects of Onitsha’s cultural heritage.

== See also ==
- Igbo culture
- Igbo people
- Women in Nigeria
- Obi of Onitsha
