= Eberechukwu Oji =

Mazi Eberechukwu Oji
- Eze Aro (King of the Aros)
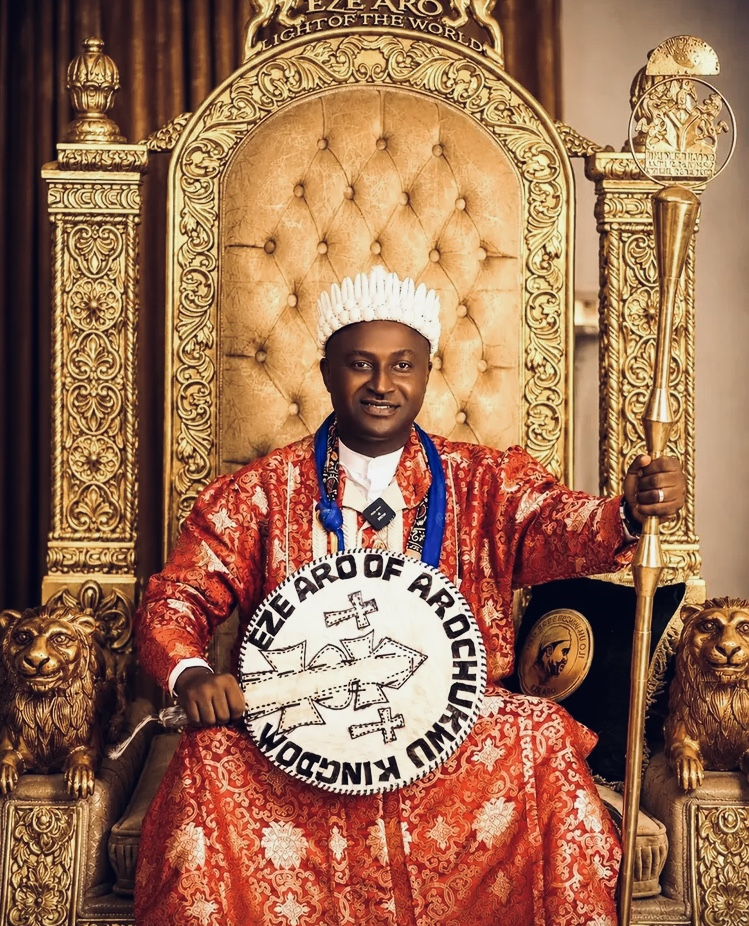
- Coronation: January 2024
- Predecessor: Mazi Vincent Ogbonnaya Okoro
- Born: Eberechukwu Eni Oji
- Spouse: Ugoeze Nneoma Oji
- Father: Prince Joshua Kanu Oji
- Mother: Doris Ekenma Oji
- Religion: Odinala, Christianity
- Occupation: Monarch

Eberechukwu Eni Oji is an Igbo monarch, engineer, ordained minister and the current Eze Aro and paramount head of the ancient Arochukwu Kingdom in Abia State, Nigeria. He was crowned Eze Aro IX in 2023 succeeding the late Eze Aro VIII, Mazi Vincent Ogbonnaya Okoro. He belongs to the Oke Nnachi royal kindred and is a grandson of Eze Kanu Oji, the longest reigning Nigerian king in history.

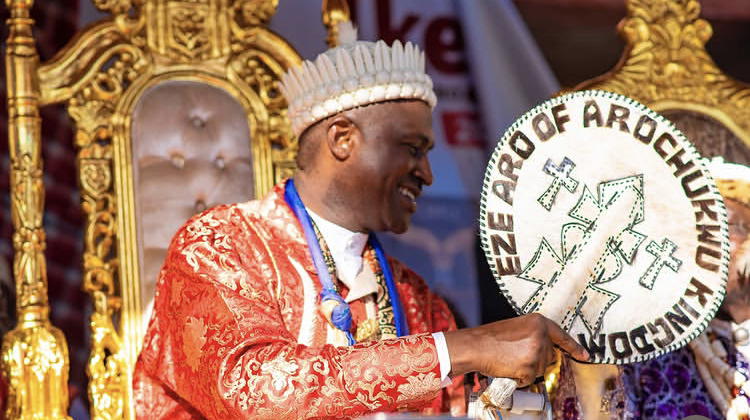
