= Royal regalia in Nigeria =

The Royal regalia are the attributes of power of the monarchs of the traditional states in Nigeria.

== History ==
Modern Nigeria is a federation, composed of a plethora of governorates and kingdoms. Some of the latter had a huge significance in the history of Nigeria before they were subdued by the British during Colonial Nigeria. Nevertheless, even today, their principal rulers have been able to maintain their religious, cultural and, to a certain extent, political influence.

== Description ==
The regalia used by these monarchs was and is still normally an object or collection of objects of a symbolic significance, such as a coat, robe, mantle, or costume with headgear of same shape or fashion.

For example, the ceremonial crown of an Oba of the Yoruba people is a cap made out of glass beads embroidered on plain weave striped and printed cotton over a metal frame.

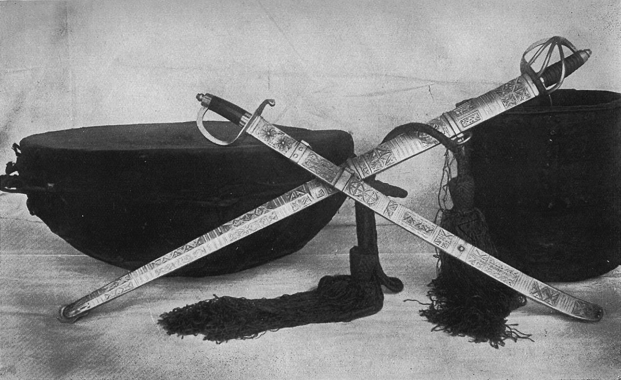
The regalia of Katsina, consisting of a large camel-drum of bronze, a bronze pot, and two swords, including Gajere, the ancient state sword of Katsina.

Other objects included in a comprehensive list of regalia could be small to medium-sized statues, such as those found in the Benin Kingdom.

The regalia often had more than merely a political significance. In the southern kingdoms most especially, it was vital for the performance of religious rituals. In this case, the ruler was seen as a link between the world of the living and the spiritual hereafter. Furthermore, in the north, the Muslim emirs and sultans had religious functions as spiritual commanders. The regalia in this case did not have any connotations of a metaphysical nature, but was seen primarily as a symbol of the power of the ruler concerned.

The regalia today would be kept at the respective capital cities, usually in the palace or palaces of each state.

In April 2005, an exhibition was shown at UNESCO Headquarters in Paris, which featured a selection of regalia from 16 states, including Sokoto, Kano, and Borno. The exhibition was organised by the Federal Ministry of Information. An exhibition of photos by George Osodi in London demonstrated an array of Nigerian monarchial styles. Another exhibition took place at the Newark Museum in 2015.

A controversy involving some of the crown treasures in question which is currently raging is the celebrated case of the Benin Bronzes, sacred items of mostly metallic statuary that were taken by the British colonial powers after their war against the Kingdom of Benin in the 19th century. The bronzes were used for various royal rituals, and were of the highest importance in the traditional religion of the Edo.

== See also ==
- List of Nigerian traditional states
- Nigerian traditional rulers
- Nigerian chieftaincy
