= Kanu Oji =

7th Aro King

Mazi Ogbuagụ Kanu Oji
- Eze Aro (King of the Aros)
- Reign: 1914–1987
- Coronation: 1914
- Predecessor: Mazi Kanu Okoro Oke
- Successor: Eze Vincent Ogbonnaya Okoro
- Born: Kanu Oji; 1900; Arochukwu, Eastern Nigeria
- Died: 1987 (aged 86–87)
- House: Eze Aro palace
- Religion: Odinala and Christianity

Kanu Oji also known as Mazi Kanu Oji (b. 1900– April 1987) was the Eze Aro VII of the Arochukwu Kingdom in Abia State. He ascended the Aro throne (Eze Aro stool) as king of the Aros in 1914 at the age of 14 following the death and exile of his uncle, his predecessor Mazi Kanu Okoro and ruled for 73 years until his death in 1987. He held the traditional title of “Ogbuagụ” (Slayer of the Leopard). His reign of 73 years is the longest reign in Nigerian history.
