= Nwagboka =

Nigerian female traditional ruler

Nwagboka, or Onye-isi Ikporo-Onicha (died 1886) was a Nigerian queen, the last omu (Queen) of Onitsha.

In 1886 she led the Ikporo Onitsha (association of Onitsha wives) in a strike against Obi Anazonwu. This all-woman boycott of social duties was intended "to remind the community that no society can function without the duties and tasks performed by its women."

After Nwagboka's death in 1886 no successor was named to the omu-ship, and since then Onitsha has only had a male monarch.
