= Eze Chima =

16th-century Igbo king

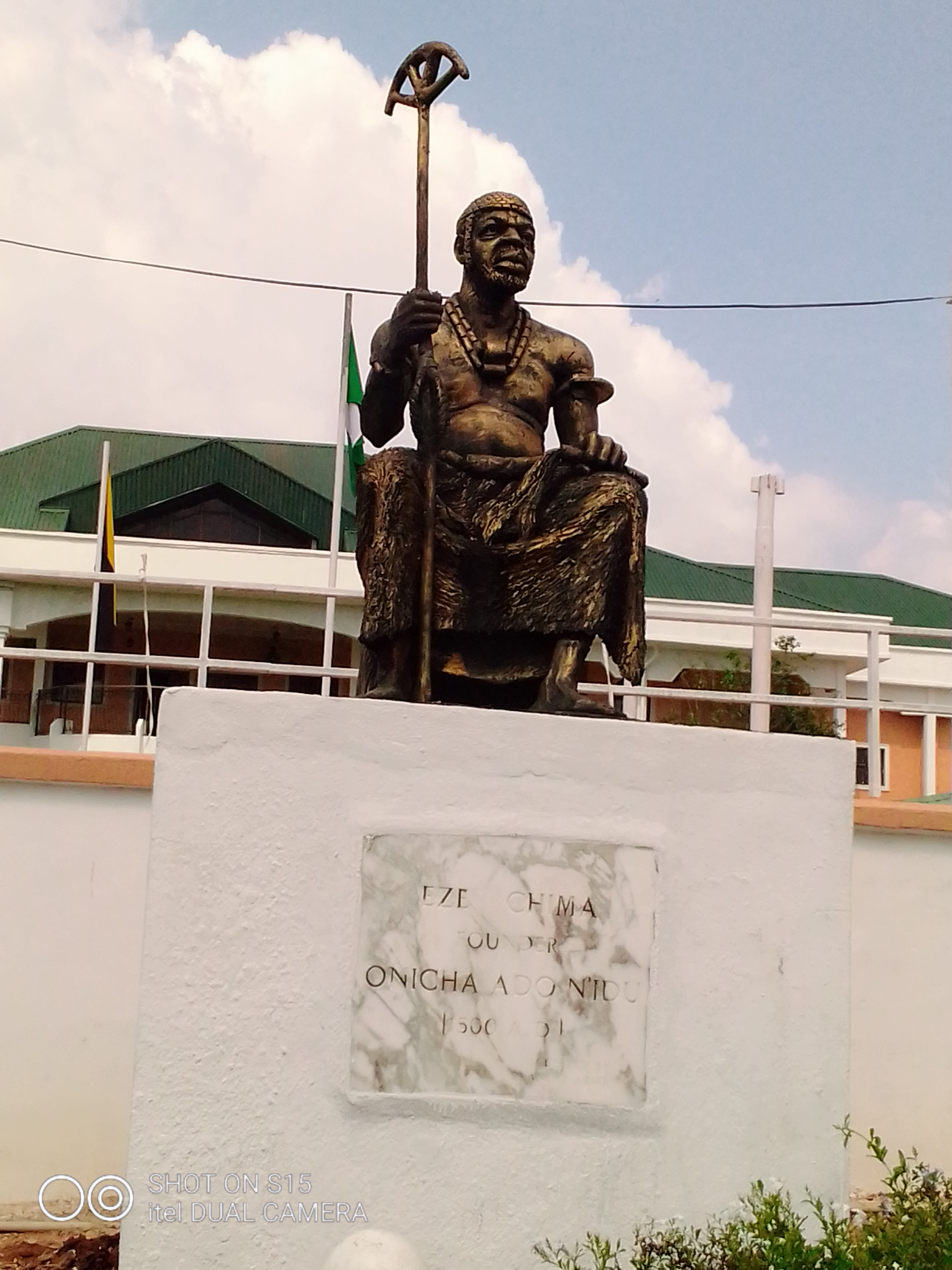

Oreze
- Born: Arochukwu
- Died: Delta State
- Religion: Odinala
- Occupation: Igbo King, Spiritualist

Eze Chima (also known as Eze Chime) is an ancient Igbo 16th-century legendary monarch, warrior and spiritualist from Arochukwu in Abia State who founded the Umu Eze Chima clan in Anioma region of Delta State and the ancestral founder of Onitsha in present day Anambra State.

According to historian, Michael Crowder in The Story of Nigeria, Eze Chima travelled to Benin Kingdom from Arochukwu Kingdom to set up practice as a spiritualist and an agent of the Aro Oracle of Ibini Ukpabi to collect slaves from the Benin Kingdom. The later departure of Eze Chima from the Kingdom occurred following a political conflict involving him and the reigning Oba of Benin, Esigie.
