= Alfred Achebe =

Nigerian traditional ruler (born 1941)

Nnaemeka Alfred Achebe (CFR), mni
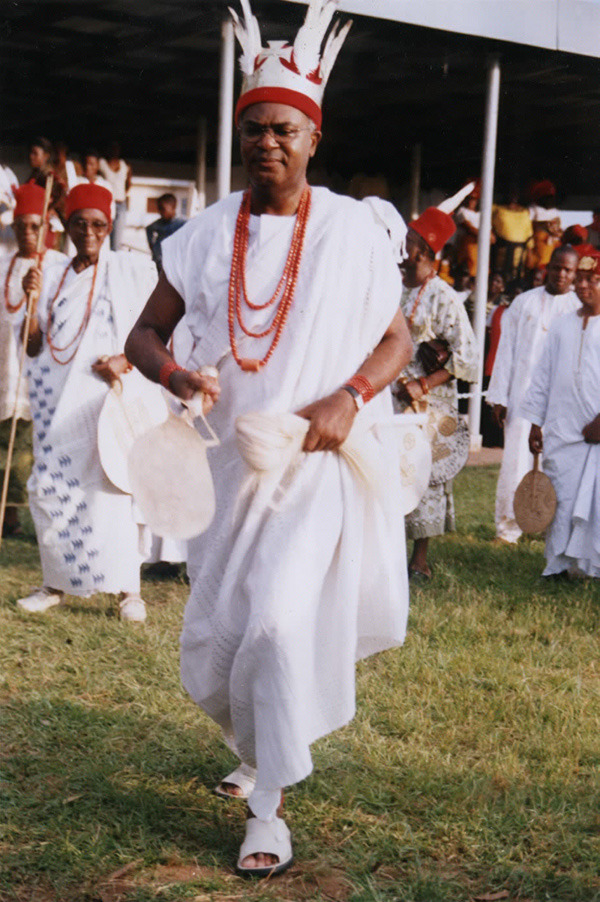

Obi of Onitsha
- Coronation: 14 May 2002 (The Obi of Onitsha is not crowned; he "emerges")
- Predecessor: Obi Okechukwu Okagbue (1970–2001)
- Born: 14 May 1941 (age 85); Onitsha, Anambra State, Nigeria
- Spouse: Chinwe Ngozi (née Ononye)
- Issue: Ezennia Odiakosa; Chinedu; Eziamaka lfunanya Uchenna and Chinwe.
- Father: Akunne Anthony Chinwuba
- Mother: Chukwuebuka W. O. Achebe

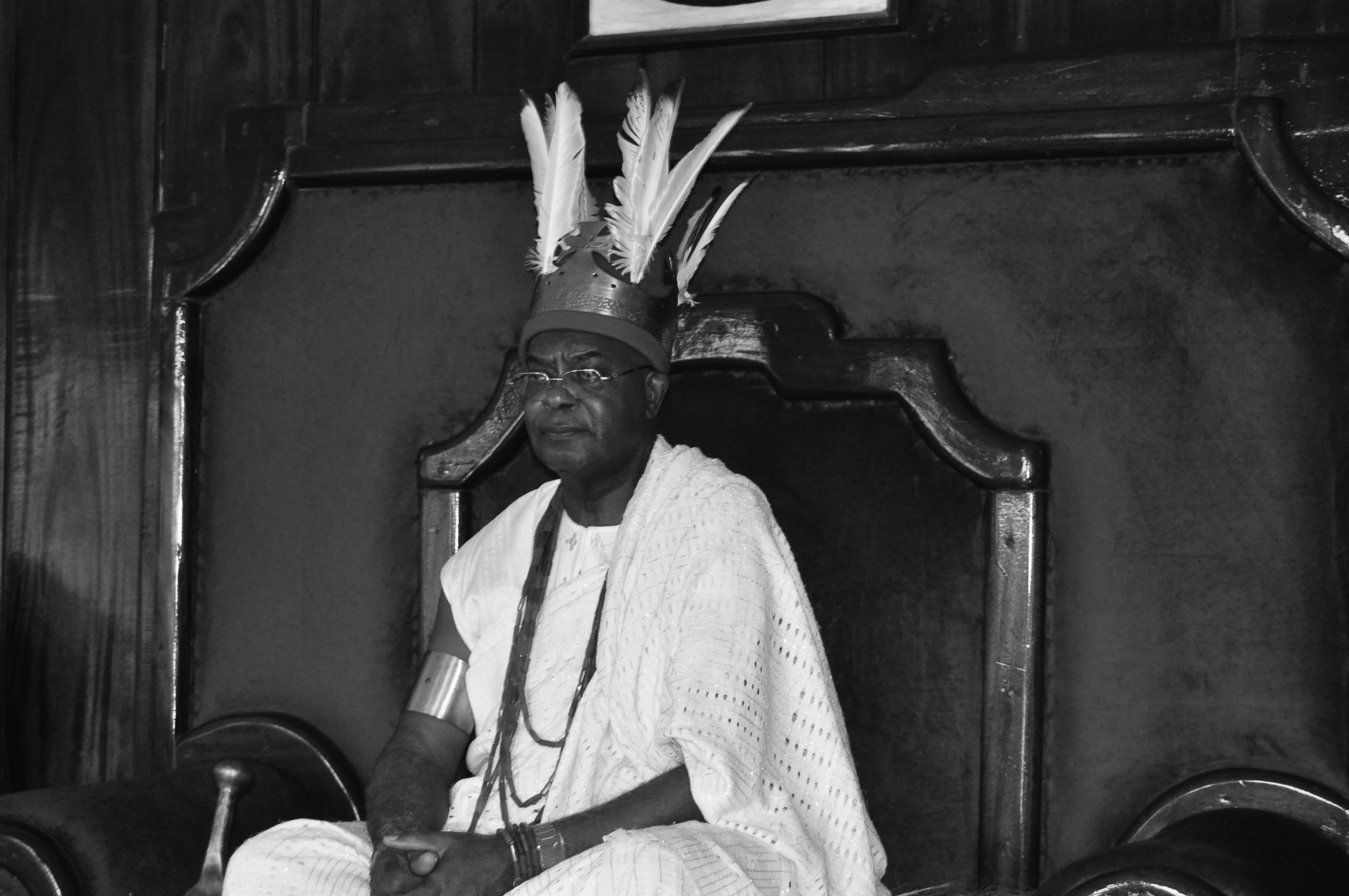

Igwe Nnaemeka Alfred Achebe CFR, mni // (born 14 May 1941) is a traditional ruler and the 21st Obi of Onitsha, in Anambra State, South-Eastern Nigeria. He is chancellor of Ahmadu Bello University since 2015, and was earlier chancellor of Kogi State University. Achebe also serves as the chairman of the board of Directors of Unilever Nigeria, and the Chairman of International Breweries (ABInBev) Nigeria. Before emerging as the Obi of Onitsha, in 2002, he had a career in the Royal Dutch Shell Group serving as Director in various companies in the group.

== Early life and education ==
He attended Government Secondary School, Owerri. Achebe holds a Bachelor of Science degree in chemistry from Stanford University in 1966 and a master's degree in Business Administration from Columbia University. In 1979, he attended the maiden Senior Executive Course of the National Institute for Policy and Strategic Studies in Kuru, near Jos.

== Career ==
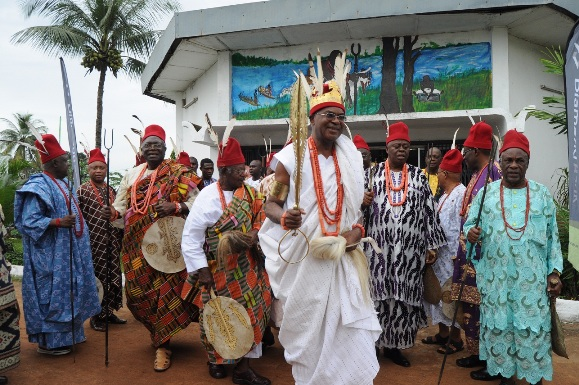
Igwe and his Kinsmen

After graduation from the university, Achebe worked briefly in the United States before he returned to Nigeria in 1972 after the Nigerian Civil War and began work with Shell Petroleum Company. He is currently a trustee, National Traditional Rulers Council and its state Chairman in Anambra State. Besides his long tenure as director of Shell Nigeria, Obi Achebe was also, during 1985 - 87, a director of several other Shell companies in the United Kingdom, the Netherlands, Ghana, Nigeria, Sierra Leone, the Gambia, Liberia and Angola.

== Life in retirement ==
Achebe retired from work in 1995 after reaching the retirement age. However, despite his retirement, he remained passively active within the company which saw him posted to Shell International in London, where he served as "ambassador at large" for Shell Nigeria. He remained in this position until his emergence as Obi of Onitsha in May 2002.

Outside Shell, Obi Achebe has held positions on the governing councils of the Petroleum Training Institute, Effurun, and the Nigerian Employers' Consultative Association. In corporate life, Obi Achebe was chairman of Diamond Bank PLC and the Universal Insurance PLC and is currently the chairman of Unilever Nigeria PLC, Intafact Beverages Limited (SAB-Miller), and Omak Maritime Limited.

On two occasions, Obi Achebe has served the nation on panels of inquiry in the petroleum sector. In 1976, he was a member of the Administrative Panel of Enquiry on the Port Harcourt Refinery. In 2004, President Obasanjo called on him to be Chairman of the Presidential Enquiry into the February 2003 Fuel Shortage in the country.

In 2005, Obi Achebe was a delegate to the National Political Reform Conference representing the traditional rulers of South-Eastern States. He became Chairman of the Committee on Environment and Natural Resources Management Reforms and coordinated the traditional rulers' forum at the Conference.

Obi Achebe is a member of several social, professional and non-profit organisations in Nigeria and overseas. He is a fellow of both the Nigerian Institute of Management and the Nigerian Institute of Public Relations. He is a Life Member of the Nigerian Economic Society and member of the Nigerian Institute of Personnel Management and Nigerian Environmental Society. He is a Vice-Patron of Island Club, Lagos; Vice-Patron of Lagos Country Club, and Member of the Metropolitan Club, Lagos.

On bilateral and multilateral relations, Obi Achebe has also represented Nigeria's interests on social, cultural and commercial matters. He has been a member of the Nigeria-Britain Association (NBA) and a life member of the counterpart Britain-Nigeria Association (BNA). He has served as a member of the Governing Board of the BNA, the Advisory Board of the Britain-Nigeria Business Council, and the Board of Trustees of the Africa Centre, all based in the United Kingdom. On becoming a traditional ruler, the Africa Centre, in recognition of his services, made him one of its five Patrons, with Nelson Mandela as the Grand Patron.

Obi Achebe has a strong passion for education as a fundamental factor in national development. In his firm belief that lack of funds should not prevent any child from acquiring a good education, he set up early in his reign a manpower development trust fund for his community. In 2007, he, along with His Majesty, Oba Okunade Sijuwade II, the late Ooni of Ife, and His Majesty, Alhaji Ado Bayero, the late Emir of Kano, were guests of the Director-General of UNESCO in Paris to share thoughts on the strategic role of monarchs in promoting the development of science and technology. In 2008 and 2010, he addressed the annual symposium of the Nigeria Higher Education Foundation in New York City to promote partnership between the US and Nigerian universities. He became Chancellor of Kogi State University in 2010.

In recognition of his varied services to the society, Obi Achebe was decorated with the National Honour* of Commander of the Order of the Federal Republic in 2004. He was appointed Chairman of the Anambra State Traditional Rulers Council in 2008; made an Honorary Fellow of the Nwafor Orizu College of Education in 2008; and awarded the degrees of Doctor of Law (LL.D.) Honoris Causa by the Anambra State University in 2008, and Doctor of Science (DSc) Honoris Causa by the Kogi State University in 2010.

== Honours ==
- (Nigeria) Commander of the Order of the Federal Republic (2004)
