= Janet Okala =

Nigerian female political leader

- Born: 1894; Onitsha
- Died: 1971 (aged 76–77)
- Citizenship: Nigerian
- Occupation: Politician

Janet Okala (1894–1971) was a Nigerian political leader and community organiser. She led protests during the Aba Women's War, and formed local and nationally-linked organisations to advocate for Nigerian women's political power.

== Early life ==
Janet Okala was born in Onitsha in 1894 as the third child and first daughter of Odukwe Odili. She later became a resident of Owerrinta where she became known for her political activism. Her alias was "Mama Bread" as she also owned a bakery.

== Political career and activism ==
In 1929, Okala led protesting women in the Owerrinta region during the Aba Women's War. According to historian Nina Emma Mba, Okala had previously provided leadership and counseling to local women but rose to particular prominence during the war.

In 1945, Okala formed the Enugu Women's Association and was elected one of its vice presidents. Following a 1949 visit from educator and campaigner Funmilayo Ransome Kuti (FRK), the group changed its name to the Enugu branch of the Nigerian Women's Union. In describing FRK's visit, Okala wrote that "Before that time women at Enugu had no right to probe into the affairs of their country. Mrs. Kuti on her arrival educated us." Local newspapers such as the West African Pilot and the Daily Times celebrated the group's name change as a symbol of nationalist solidarity among Nigerian women.
