= Obi of Onitsha =

Traditional leader of Onitsha city, Nigeria

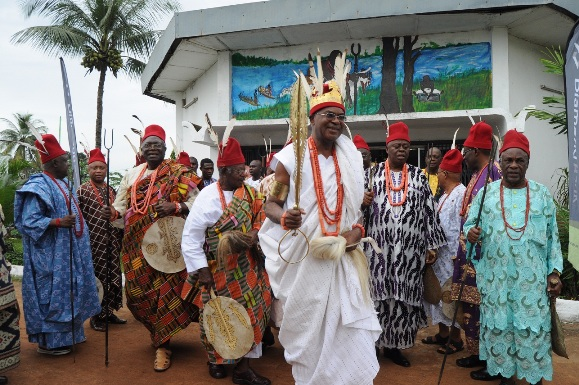
Photo of the current Obi of Onitsha: Igwe Alfred Achebe in his white regalia.

The Obi of Onitsha is the traditional leader of Onitsha, Anambra State, southeast Nigeria. The post of the Obi is recognized by the state and federal government of Nigeria, and the Obi is seen as a representative of the people of Onitsha to the state and federal levels of government. The current Obi is Igwe Nnaemeka Alfred Ugochukwu Achebe.

== Career ==
Achebe served as Shell Petroleum Development Company Director. In 2015, he became the Chancellor of Ahmadu Bello University Zaria.

== List of Onitsha sovereigns ==
- (Eze) Chima (Mid-16th century)
- Oreze (16th–17th century)
- Chimaevi (17th century)
- Chimukwu (17th century)
- Chimaezi (17th century)
- Nafia (17th century)
- Tasia (17th century)
- Eze Aroli (17th–18th century)
- Chimedie (18th century)
- Omozele (18th century)
- Ezeolisa (18th century)
- Ijelekpe (18th–19th century)
- Udogwu (C. 1820)
- Akazue (1840–1873)
- Diali (1873–1874)
- Anazonwu (1874–1899)
- Samuel Okosi (1901–1931)
- James Okosi (1935–1961)
- Joseph Okwudili Onyejekwe (1962–1970)
- Ofala Okechukwu Okagbue (1970–2001)
- Alfred Achebe (2002–present)

== See also ==
- Otu odu society
- Igbo people
- Igboland
