= November 18 =

November 18 this year in various calendars
- Wednesday, 18 November 2026
| Akan | Monowukuo |
| Armenian | 1 Kʿaloch 1476 |
| Aztec | Tlacaxipehualiztli 7, 1 Xōchitl |
| Babylonian | 7 Arakhsamna, 2337 SE |
| Balinese pawukon | Luang, Pepet, Kajeng, Laba, Wage, Maulu, Buda of Ukir, Indra, Erangan, Pati |
| Bengali | 3 Ogrohayon, BS 1433 |
| Chinese | Yang Fire Monkey・Winnowing Basket Mansion; Fire Horse Year, Month 10, Day 10 (Lidong, 4 days until Xiaoxue) |
| Common Era | 18 November 2026 CE |
| Coptic | 9 Hathor, AM 1743 |
| Egyptian | 6 Pharmuthi, 2775 NE |
| Ethiopian | 9 H̱edār, 2019 Amätä Məhrät |
| French Republican | Décade III, Septidi de Brumaire de l'Année 235 de la République |
| Gregorian | 18 November, AD 2026 |
| Hebrew | 8 Kislev, AM 5787 |
| Hindu | Śatabhiṣaj・Dhruva; Solar: 2 Mārgaśīrṣa, 1948 SE; Lunisolar: Navamī, Śukla pakṣa of Kārtika, 2083 VE; Rāudra・5127 KY・1,872,897 |
| Icelandic | Miðvikudagur, 26 Gormánuður 2026 |
| Islamic | 7 Jumada al-thani, AH 1448 (using tabular method) |
| ISO week date | 2026-W47-3 |
| Japanese | 10 Kannazuki, Reiwa 8 (Rittō, 4 days until Shōsetsu) |
| Julian | 5 November, AD 2026 (AM 7535) |
| Julian day | 2461363 |
| Korean | 10 Dwaejidal, 4359 DE |
| Maya | 13.0.14.2.0; 13 Ceh, 1 Ahau |
| Roman | Nonis Novembribus, MMDCCLXXIX AUC |
| Solar Hijri | 27 Aban, SH 1405 |
| Tibetan | 9 smin drug, me pho rta 2153 or 1772 or 1000 |

| << | November | | | | | >> |
| Su | Mo | Tu | We | Th | Fr | Sa |
| 1 | 2 | 3 | 4 | 5 | 6 | 7 |
| 8 | 9 | 10 | 11 | 12 | 13 | 14 |
| 15 | 16 | 17 | 18 | 19 | 20 | 21 |
| 22 | 23 | 24 | 25 | 26 | 27 | 28 |
| 29 | 30 |
2026

November 18 in recent years
2026 (Wednesday)
2025 (Tuesday)
2024 (Monday)
2023 (Saturday)
2022 (Friday)
2021 (Thursday)
2020 (Wednesday)
2019 (Monday)
2018 (Sunday)
2017 (Saturday)

November 18 is the 322nd day of the year (323rd in leap years) in the Gregorian calendar; 43 days remain until the end of the year.

== Events ==
=== Pre-1600 ===
- 326 – The old St. Peter's Basilica is consecrated by Pope Sylvester I.
- 401 – The Visigoths, led by king Alaric I, cross the Alps and invade northern Italy.
- 1095 – The Council of Clermont begins: called by Pope Urban II, it led to the First Crusade to the Holy Land.
- 1105 – Maginulfo is elected Antipope Sylvester IV in opposition to Pope Paschal II.
- 1210 – Pope Innocent III excommunicates Holy Roman Emperor Otto IV for invading the Kingdom of Sicily after promising to recognize papal control over it.
- 1302 – Pope Boniface VIII issues the Papal bull Unam sanctam, claiming spiritual supremacy for the papacy.
- 1421 – St Elizabeth's flood: A dike in the Grote Hollandse Waard in the Netherlands breaks, killing about 10,000 people.
- 1493 – Christopher Columbus first sights the island now known as Puerto Rico.

=== 1601–1900 ===
- 1601 – Tiryaki Hasan Pasha, an Ottoman provincial governor, routs the Habsburg forces commanded by Archduke Ferdinand II of Austria who were besieging Nagykanizsa.
- 1626 – The new St. Peter's Basilica in Rome is consecrated.
- 1730 – The future Frederick the Great of Prussia is granted a pardon by his father and is released from confinement.
- 1760 – The rebuilt debtors' prison, at the Castellania in Valletta, receives the first prisoners.
- 1803 – The Battle of Vertières, the last major battle of the Haitian Revolution, is fought, leading to the establishment of the Republic of Haiti, the first black republic in the Western Hemisphere.
- 1809 – Napoleonic Wars: In a naval action, French frigates defeat British East Indiamen in the Bay of Bengal.
- 1812 – Napoleonic Wars: The Battle of Krasnoi ends in French defeat, but Marshal of France Michel Ney's leadership leads to him becoming known as "the bravest of the brave".
- 1863 – King Christian IX of Denmark signs the November constitution that declares Schleswig to be part of Denmark. This is seen by the German Confederation as a violation of the London Protocol and leads to the German–Danish war of 1864.
- 1867 – An earthquake strikes the Virgin Islands, triggering the largest tsunami witnessed in the Caribbean and killing dozens.
- 1872 – Susan B. Anthony and 14 other women are arrested for voting illegally in the United States presidential election of 1872.
- 1883 – In the "day of two noons", American and Canadian railroad companies institute four standard continental time zones, ending the confusion of thousands of local times.
- 1889 - Elisha P. Ferry is inaugurated as first governor of Washington.

=== 1901–present ===
- 1901 – Britain and the United States sign the Hay–Pauncefote Treaty, which nullifies the Clayton–Bulwer Treaty and withdraws British objections to an American-controlled canal in Panama.
- 1903 – The Hay–Bunau-Varilla Treaty is signed by the United States and Panama, giving the United States exclusive rights over the Panama Canal Zone.
- 1905 – Prince Carl of Denmark becomes King Haakon VII of Norway.
- 1909 – Two United States warships are sent to Nicaragua after 500 revolutionaries (including two Americans) are executed by order of José Santos Zelaya.
- 1910 – In their campaign for women's voting rights, hundreds of suffragettes march to the British Parliament in London. Several are beaten by police, newspaper attention embarrasses the authorities, and the march is dubbed Black Friday.
- 1916 – World War I: First Battle of the Somme: In France, British Expeditionary Force commander Douglas Haig calls off the battle which started on July 1, 1916.
- 1918 – Latvia declares its independence from Russia.
- 1928 – Release of the animated short Steamboat Willie, the first fully synchronized sound cartoon.
- 1929 – Grand Banks earthquake: Off the south coast of Newfoundland in the Atlantic Ocean, a Richter magnitude 7.2 submarine earthquake, centered on the Grand Banks, breaks 12 submarine transatlantic telegraph cables and triggers a tsunami that destroys many south coast communities in the Burin Peninsula.
- 1940 – World War II: German leader Adolf Hitler and Italian Foreign Minister Galeazzo Ciano meet to discuss Benito Mussolini's disastrous Italian invasion of Greece.
- 1943 – World War II: In the first action of the Berlin Air Offensive, four hundred and forty Royal Air Force planes bomb Berlin causing only light damage and killing 131. The RAF loses nine aircraft and 53 air crew.
- 1944 – The Popular Socialist Youth is founded in Cuba.
- 1947 – The Ballantyne's Department Store fire in Christchurch, New Zealand, kills 41; it is the worst fire disaster in the history of New Zealand.
- 1949 – The Iva Valley Shooting occurs after the coal miners of Enugu in Nigeria go on strike over withheld wages; 21 miners are shot dead and 51 are wounded by police under the supervision of the British colonial administration of Nigeria.
- 1961 – Vietnam War: United States President John F. Kennedy sends 18,000 military advisors to South Vietnam.
- 1963 – The Bell Telephone Company introduces the first push-button telephone.
- 1970 – U.S. President Richard Nixon asks the U.S. Congress for $155 million in supplemental aid for the Cambodian government.
- 1971 – Oman declares its independence from the United Kingdom.
- 1978 – The McDonnell Douglas F/A-18 Hornet makes its first flight, at the Naval Air Test Center in Maryland, United States.
- 1978 – In Jonestown, Guyana, Jim Jones leads his Peoples Temple to a mass murder–suicide that claimed 918 lives in all, 909 of them in Jonestown itself, including over 270 children.
- 1983 – Aeroflot Flight 6833 is hijacked en route from Tbilisi to Leningrad. After returning to Tbilisi, the aircraft is subsequently raided on the ground, resulting in seven deaths.
- 1985 – The first comic of Calvin and Hobbes is published in ten newspapers.
- 1987 – King's Cross fire: In London, 31 people die in a fire at the city's busiest underground station, King's Cross St Pancras.
- 1991 – Shiite Muslim kidnappers in Lebanon release Anglican Church envoys Terry Waite and Thomas Sutherland.
- 1991 – After an 87-day siege, the Croatian city of Vukovar capitulates to the besieging Yugoslav People's Army and allied Serb paramilitary forces.
- 1991 – The autonomous Croatian Community of Herzeg-Bosnia, which would in 1993 become a republic, was established in Bosnia and Herzegovina.
- 1993 – In the United States, the North American Free Trade Agreement (NAFTA) is approved by the House of Representatives.
- 1993 – In South Africa, 21 political parties approve a new constitution, expanding voting rights and ending white minority rule.
- 1996 – A fire occurs on a train traveling through the Channel Tunnel from France to England causing several injuries and damaging approximately 500 metres (1,600 ft) of tunnel.
- 1999 – At Texas A&M University, the Aggie Bonfire collapses killing 12 students and injuring 27 others.
- 2002 – Iraq disarmament crisis: United Nations weapons inspectors led by Hans Blix arrive in Iraq.
- 2003 – The Massachusetts Supreme Judicial Court rules 4–3 in Goodridge v. Department of Public Health that the state's ban on same-sex marriage is unconstitutional and gives the state legislature 180 days to change the law making Massachusetts the first state in the United States to grant marriage rights to same-sex couples.
- 2012 – Pope Tawadros II of Alexandria becomes the 118th Pope of the Coptic Orthodox Church of Alexandria.
- 2013 – NASA launches the MAVEN probe to Mars.
- 2020 – The Utah monolith, built sometime in 2016 is discovered by state biologists of the Utah Division of Wildlife Resources.
- 2026 – Voyager 1 becomes the first manmade object to travel a full light day from Earth.

== Births ==
=== Pre-1600 ===
- 701 – Itzam K'an Ahk II, Mayan ruler (died 757)
- 709 – Emperor Kōnin of Japan (died 782)
- 1522 – Lamoral, Count of Egmont (died 1568)
- 1571 – Hippolytus Guarinonius, Italian physician and polymath (died 1654)
- 1576 – Philipp Ludwig II, Count of Hanau-Münzenberg (died 1612)

=== 1601–1900 ===
- 1630 – Eleonora Gonzaga, Italian wife of Ferdinand III, Holy Roman Emperor (died 1686)
- 1647 – Pierre Bayle, French philosopher and author (died 1706)
- 1727 – Philibert Commerson, French physician and explorer (died 1773)
- 1736 – Carl Friedrich Christian Fasch, German harpsichord player and composer (died 1800)
- 1756 – Thomas Burgess, English bishop and philosopher (died 1837)
- 1772 – Prince Louis Ferdinand of Prussia (died 1806)
- 1774 – Wilhelmine of Prussia, Queen of the Netherlands (died 1837)
- 1785 – David Wilkie, Scottish painter and academic (died 1841)
- 1786 – Carl Maria von Weber, German composer and conductor (probable; died 1826)
- 1787 – Louis Daguerre, French artist, photographer and inventor (died 1851)
- 1804 – Alfonso Ferrero La Marmora, Italian general and politician, 6th Prime Minister of Italy (died 1878)
- 1810 – Asa Gray, American botanist and academic (died 1888)
- 1832 – Adolf Erik Nordenskiöld, Finnish-Swedish geologist and explorer (died 1901)
- 1833 – James Patterson, English-Australian politician, 17th Premier of Victoria (died 1895)
- 1836 – W. S. Gilbert, English playwright, poet, and illustrator (died 1911)
- 1839 – August Kundt, German physicist and educator (died 1894)
- 1856 – Grand Duke Nicholas Nikolaevich of Russia (died 1929)
- 1860 – Ignacy Jan Paderewski, Polish pianist, composer, and politician, 2nd Prime Minister of the Republic of Poland (died 1941)
- 1862 – John Matthew Moore, American politician (died 1940)
- 1866 – Henry Daglish, Australian politician, Premier of Western Australia (died 1920)
- 1871 – Robert Hugh Benson, English Catholic priest and novelist (died 1914)
- 1874 – Clarence Day, American author and poet (died 1935)
- 1876 – Victor Hémery, French racing driver (died 1950)
- 1880 – Naum Torbov, Bulgarian architect, designed the Central Sofia Market Hall (died 1952)
- 1882 – Amelita Galli-Curci, Italian-American soprano (died 1963)
- 1882 – Wyndham Lewis, English painter and critic (died 1957)
- 1882 – Jacques Maritain, French philosopher and author (died 1973)
- 1882 – Frances Gertrude McGill, pioneering Canadian forensic pathologist (died 1959)
- 1883 – Carl Vinson, American judge and politician (died 1981)
- 1886 – Ferenc Münnich, Hungarian soldier and politician, 47th Prime Minister of Hungary (died 1967)
- 1888 – Frances Marion, American screenwriter, novelist and journalist (died 1973)
- 1889 – Stanislav Kosior, Polish-Russian politician (died 1939)
- 1890 – Laura Negley, American politician, member of the Texas House of Representatives (died 1973)
- 1891 – Gio Ponti, Italian architect, industrial designer, furniture designer, artist, and publisher. (died 1979)
- 1897 – Patrick Blackett, Baron Blackett, English physicist and academic, Nobel Prize laureate (died 1974)
- 1899 – Eugene Ormandy, Hungarian-American violinist and conductor (died 1985)
- 1899 – Howard Thurman, American author, philosopher and civil rights activist (died 1981)

=== 1901–present ===
- 1901 – George Gallup, American statistician (died 1984)
- 1901 – V. Shantaram, Indian actor, director, producer, and screenwriter (died 1984)
- 1901 – Craig Wood, American golfer (died 1968)
- 1904 – Masao Koga, Japanese composer and guitarist (died 1978)
- 1904 – Alan Lennox-Boyd, 1st Viscount Boyd of Merton, English lieutenant and politician, Secretary of State for the Colonies (died 1983)
- 1906 – Sait Faik Abasıyanık, Turkish author and poet (died 1954)
- 1906 – Alec Issigonis, Greek-English car designer, designed the mini car (died 1988)
- 1906 – Klaus Mann, German-American novelist, short story writer, and critic (died 1949)
- 1906 – George Wald, American neurobiologist and academic, Nobel Prize laureate (died 1997)
- 1907 – Gustav Nezval, Czech actor (died 1998)
- 1907 – Compay Segundo, Cuban singer-songwriter and guitarist (died 2003)
- 1908 – Imogene Coca, American actress, comedian, and singer (died 2001)
- 1909 – Johnny Mercer, American singer-songwriter and producer, co-founded Capitol Records (died 1976)
- 1911 – Attilio Bertolucci, Italian poet and author (died 2000)
- 1912 – Vic Hey, Australian rugby league player and coach (died 1995)
- 1912 – Hilda Nickson, English author (died 1977)
- 1913 – Endre Rozsda, Hungarian-French painter and illustrator (died 1999)
- 1914 – Haguroyama Masaji, Japanese sumo wrestler, the 36th Yokozuna (died 1969)
- 1915 – Ken Burkhart, American baseball player and umpire (died 2004)
- 1917 – Pedro Infante, Mexican actor and singer (died 1957)
- 1918 – İlhan Berk, Turkish poet and author (died 2008)
- 1918 – Tasker Watkins, Welsh soldier, judge, and politician, Victoria Cross recipient (died 2007)
- 1919 – Jocelyn Brando, American actress (died 2005)
- 1920 – Robert Fryer, American playwright and producer (died 2000)
- 1920 – Mustafa Khalil, Egyptian lawyer and politician, 77th Prime Minister of Egypt (died 2008)
- 1920 – Ron Suart, English football player and manager (died 2015)
- 1921 – Frances Hawkins, American politician and teacher, member of the Nevada State Assembly (died 2001)
- 1922 – Marjorie Gestring, American springboard diver (died 1992)
- 1922 – Luis Somoza Debayle, Nicaraguan politician, 70th President of Nicaragua (died 1967)
- 1923 – Cornelis Ruhtenberg, American painter (died 2008)
- 1923 – Alan Shepard, American astronaut (died 1998)
- 1923 – Ted Stevens, American politician (died 2010)
- 1924 – Anna Elisabeth (Lise) Østergaard, Danish psychologist and politician (died 1996)
- 1926 – Roy Sievers, American baseball player (died 2017)
- 1927 – Hank Ballard, American R&B singer-songwriter (died 2003)
- 1927 – Knowlton Nash, Canadian journalist and author (died 2014)
- 1928 – Salvador Laurel, Filipino lawyer and politician, 5th Prime Minister of the Philippines (died 2004)
- 1928 – Sheila Jordan, American singer-songwriter and pianist (died 2025)
- 1929 – Gianna D'Angelo, American soprano and educator (died 2013)
- 1932 – Danny McDevitt, American baseball player (died 2010)
- 1933 – Bruce Conner, American painter, photographer, and director (died 2008)
- 1933 – Vassilis Vassilikos, Greek journalist and diplomat (died 2023)
- 1935 – Rudolf Bahro, German philosopher and politician (died 1997)
- 1936 – Ennio Antonelli, Italian cardinal
- 1936 – Don Cherry, American trumpet player (died 1995)
- 1936 – John Edmond, Rhodesian folk singer and soldier
- 1938 – Jules Mikhael Al-Jamil, Iraqi-Lebanese archbishop (died 2012)
- 1938 – Norbert Ratsirahonana, Malagasy politician, Prime Minister of Madagascar
- 1938 – Karl Schranz, Austrian skier
- 1939 – Margaret Atwood, Canadian author
- 1939 – Margaret Jay, Baroness Jay of Paddington, English journalist and politician, Leader of the House of Lords
- 1939 – Amanda Lear, Hong Kong-French singer-songwriter and actress
- 1939 – Brenda Vaccaro, American actress
- 1940 – James Welch, American novelist and poet (died 2003)
- 1941 – Gary Bettenhausen, American race car driver (died 2014)
- 1941 – David Hemmings, English actor and director (died 2003)
- 1942 – Linda Evans, American actress
- 1942 – Susan Sullivan, American actress
- 1943 – Leonardo Sandri, Argentinian cardinal
- 1944 – Wolfgang Joop, German fashion designer, founded JOOP!
- 1944 – Ed Krupp, American astronomer, archaeoastronomer, author, Director Griffith Observatory
- 1945 – Wilma Mankiller, American tribal chief (died 2010)
- 1945 – Mahinda Rajapaksa, Sri Lankan lawyer and politician, 6th President of Sri Lanka
- 1946 – Alan Dean Foster, American author
- 1947 – Jameson Parker, American actor
- 1947 – Ross Wilson, Australian singer-songwriter, guitarist, and producer
- 1948 – Tõnis Mägi, Estonian singer-songwriter, guitarist, and actor
- 1948 – Kongō Masahiro, Japanese sumo wrestler (died 2014)
- 1948 – Ana Mendieta, Cuban-American sculptor and painter (died 1985)
- 1948 – Jack Tatum, American football player (died 2010)
- 1949 – Herman Rarebell, German rock drummer and songwriter
- 1950 – Graham Parker, English singer-songwriter and guitarist
- 1950 – Rudy Sarzo, Cuban-American rock bass player
- 1951 – Pete Morelli, American businessman
- 1951 – Justin Raimondo, American journalist and author (died 2019)
- 1952 – Peter Beattie, Australian lawyer and politician, 36th Premier of Queensland
- 1952 – Delroy Lindo, English-American actor and director
- 1952 – John Parr, English singer-songwriter and guitarist
- 1953 – Jan Kuehnemund, American rock guitarist (died 2013)
- 1953 – Alan Moore, English author
- 1953 – Kevin Nealon, American comedian and actor
- 1954 – Carter Burwell, American composer and conductor
- 1956 – Noel Brotherston, Irish-English footballer and painter (died 1995)
- 1956 – Warren Moon, American football player and sportscaster
- 1956 – Jim Weirich, American computer scientist, developed Rake Software (died 2014)
- 1957 – Tony Bunn, American bassist, composer, producer, and writer
- 1958 – Daniel Brailovsky, Argentine-Israeli footballer and manager
- 1958 – Oscar Nunez, Cuban-American actor and comedian
- 1959 – Jimmy Quinn, Northern Irish footballer and manager
- 1960 – Ivans Klementjevs, Latvian canoeist
- 1960 – Elizabeth Perkins, American actress
- 1960 – Yeşim Ustaoğlu, Turkish director, producer, and screenwriter
- 1960 – Kim Wilde, English singer-songwriter
- 1961 – Steven Moffat, Scottish screenwriter and producer
- 1962 – Tim Guinee, American actor
- 1962 – Kirk Hammett, American guitarist, songwriter, member of the thrash metal band Metallica
- 1962 – Jamie Moyer, American baseball player
- 1963 – Len Bias, American basketball player (died 1986)
- 1963 – Dante Bichette, American baseball player and coach
- 1963 – Todd Bowles, American football player and coach
- 1963 – Peter Schmeichel, Danish footballer and sportscaster
- 1964 – Rita Cosby, American journalist and author
- 1965 – Tim DeLaughter, American singer-songwriter and musician
- 1967 – Jocelyn Lemieux, Canadian ice hockey player and sportscaster
- 1968 – Romany Malco, American rapper, producer, actor, and screenwriter
- 1968 – Gary Sheffield, American baseball player
- 1968 – Owen Wilson, American actor
- 1969 – Sam Cassell, American basketball player and coach
- 1969 – Ahmed Helmy, Egyptian actor
- 1969 – Koichiro Kimura, Japanese mixed martial artist and wrestler (died 2014)
- 1969 – Duncan Sheik, American singer-songwriter and composer (died 2026)
- 1970 – Mike Epps, American actor and comedian
- 1970 – Megyn Kelly, American lawyer and journalist
- 1970 – Peta Wilson, Australian model and actress
- 1971 – Thérèse Coffey, English chemist and politician
- 1971 – Terrance Hayes, American poet and academic
- 1971 – Matthew Rodwell, Australian rugby league player and sportscaster
- 1972 – Jeroen Straathof, Dutch cyclist and speed skater
- 1973 – Jonnie Irwin, English television presenter and business expert (died 2024)
- 1973 – Nic Pothas, South African cricketer and coach
- 1974 – Graham Coughlan, Irish footballer and coach
- 1974 – Chloë Sevigny, American actress, model, and fashion designer
- 1974 – Petter Solberg, Norwegian racing driver
- 1975 – Anthony McPartlin, English comedian, actor, and producer
- 1975 – David Ortiz, Dominican-American baseball player
- 1976 – Dominic Armato, American voice actor
- 1976 – Sage Francis, American rapper
- 1976 – Steven Pasquale, American actor
- 1976 – Shagrath, Norwegian singer-songwriter
- 1976 – Matt Welsh, Australian swimmer
- 1976 – Mona Zaki, Egyptian actress
- 1977 – Trent Barrett, Australian rugby league player, coach, and sportscaster
- 1977 – Fabolous, American rapper
- 1978 – Damien Johnson, Irish footballer
- 1978 – Aldo Montano, Italian fencer
- 1979 – Neeti Mohan, Indian playback singer
- 1979 – Nate Parker, American actor, director, producer, and screenwriter
- 1980 – Hamza al-Ghamdi, Saudi Arabian terrorist, hijacker of United Airlines Flight 175 (died 2001)
- 1980 – Luke Chadwick, English footballer
- 1980 – Minori Chihara, Japanese voice actress and singer
- 1980 – François Duval, Belgian racing driver
- 1980 – Denny Hamlin, American race car driver
- 1980 – C. J. Wilson, American baseball player
- 1981 – Mekia Cox, American actress and dancer
- 1981 – Dianne dela Fuente, Filipino singer and actress
- 1981 – Nasim Pedrad, Iranian-American actress
- 1981 – Vittoria Puccini, Italian actress
- 1981 – Christina Vidal, American actress and singer
- 1982 – Justin Knapp, American Wikipedia editor
- 1982 – Damon Wayans Jr., American actor and comedian
- 1983 – Travis Buck, American baseball player
- 1983 – Jon Lech Johansen, Norwegian computer programmer and engineer, created DeCSS
- 1984 – Ryohei Chiba, Japanese singer and dancer
- 1984 – Aleksander Ihnatowicz, Polish programmer and actor
- 1984 – Enar Jääger, Estonian footballer
- 1985 – Allyson Felix, American sprinter
- 1987 – Jake Abel, American actor
- 1987 – Cal Clutterbuck, Canadian ice hockey player
- 1987 – Yoon Park, South Korean actor
- 1988 – Jeffrey Jordan, American basketball player
- 1988 – Michael Roach, American soccer player
- 1988 – Marie-Josée Ta Lou, Ivorian sprinter
- 1989 – Marc Albrighton, English footballer
- 1989 – Lu Jiajing, Chinese tennis player
- 1990 – Arnett Moultrie, American basketball player
- 1991 – Ahmed Kelly, Iraqi-Australian swimmer
- 1991 – Noppawan Lertcheewakarn, Thai tennis player
- 1991 – Jameson Taillon, Canadian-American baseball player
- 1992 – Nathan Kress, American actor and director
- 1992 – Henry Martín, Mexican footballer
- 1992 – Quincy Miller, American basketball player
- 1992 – Steven Skrzybski, German footballer
- 1992 – Joe Thuney, American football player
- 1994 – Akiyuki Hashimoto, Japanese sprinter
- 1994 – Danka Kovinić, Montenegrin tennis player
- 1994 – Bernhard Luxbacher, Austrian footballer
- 1996 – Akram Afif, Qatari footballer
- 1996 – Christian Kirk, American football player
- 1997 – Jacob Bryson, Canadian ice hockey player
- 1997 – Shea Langeliers, American baseball player
- 1997 – Robert Sánchez, Spanish footballer
- 2001 – Caleb Williams, American football player
- 2002 – Patrick Baldwin Jr., American basketball player
- 2004 – Luka Romero, Mexican-Argentine footballer

== Deaths ==
=== Pre-1600 ===
- 942 – Odo of Cluny, Frankish abbot and saint (born c. 878)
- 953 – Liutgard of Saxony, duchess of Lorraine (born 931)
- 1100 – Thomas of Bayeux, archbishop of York
- 1154 – Adelaide of Maurienne, French queen consort (born 1092)
- 1170 – Albert the Bear, margrave of Brandenburg (born c. 1100)
- 1259 – Adam Marsh, English scholar and theologian
- 1305 – John II, duke of Brittany (born 1239)
- 1313 – Constance of Portugal, Portuguese infanta (born 1290)
- 1349 – Frederick II, Margrave of Meissen (born 1310)
- 1441 – Roger Bolingbroke, English cleric, astronomer, astrologer, magister and alleged necromancer
- 1472 – Basilius Bessarion, titular patriarch of Constantinople (born c. 1403)
- 1482 – Gedik Ahmed Pasha, Ottoman politician, 17th Grand Vizier of the Ottoman Empire
- 1559 – Cuthbert Tunstall, English bishop (born 1474)
- 1565 – Yun Wŏnhyŏng, Korean writer and politician (born 1509)
- 1590 – George Talbot, 6th Earl of Shrewsbury, English commander and politician, Lord High Steward of Ireland (born 1528)

=== 1601–1900 ===
- 1664 – Miklós Zrínyi, Croatian and Hungarian military leader and statesman (born 1620)
- 1724 – Bartolomeu de Gusmão, Portuguese priest (born 1685)
- 1785 – Louis Philippe I, Duke of Orléans (born 1725)
- 1797 – Jacques-Alexandre Laffon de Ladebat, French shipbuilder and merchant (born 1719)
- 1804 – Philip Schuyler, American general and senator (born 1733)
- 1814 – William Jessop, English engineer (born 1745)
- 1830 – Adam Weishaupt, German philosopher and academic, founded the Illuminati (born 1748)
- 1839 – Wilhelmine von Wrochem, German flutist, singer and actress (born 1798)
- 1841 – Agustín Gamarra, Peruvian general and politician, 10th and 14th President of Peru (born 1785)
- 1852 – Rose Philippine Duchesne, French-American nun and saint (born 1769)
- 1886 – Chester A. Arthur, American general, lawyer, and politician, 21st President of the United States (born 1829)
- 1889 – William Allingham, Irish-English poet and scholar (born 1824)

=== 1901–present ===
- 1909 – Renée Vivien, English-French poet (born 1877)
- 1917 – Stanley Maude, British Army officer (born 1864)
- 1922 – Marcel Proust, French author and critic (born 1871)
- 1927 – Scipione Borghese, 10th Prince of Sulmona Italian race car driver, explorer, and politician (born 1871)
- 1936 – V. O. Chidambaram Pillai, Indian lawyer and politician (born 1872)
- 1940 – Ivane Javakhishvili, Georgian historian and academic (born 1876)
- 1941 – Émile Nelligan, Canadian poet and author (born 1879)
- 1941 – Walther Nernst, German chemist and physicist, Nobel Prize laureate (born 1864)
- 1941 – Chris Watson, Chilean-Australian journalist and politician, 3rd Prime Minister of Australia (born 1867)
- 1952 – Paul Éluard, French poet and author (born 1895)
- 1962 – Niels Bohr, Danish footballer, physicist, and academic, Nobel Prize laureate (born 1885)
- 1965 – Henry A. Wallace, American agronomist and bureaucrat, 33rd Vice President of the United States, 11th US Secretary of Agriculture (born 1888)
- 1969 – Ted Heath, English trombonist and bandleader (born 1902)
- 1969 – Joseph P. Kennedy Sr., American businessman and diplomat, 44th United States Ambassador to the United Kingdom (born 1888)
- 1972 – Danny Whitten, American singer-songwriter and guitarist (Crazy Horse) (born 1943)
- 1976 – Man Ray, American-French photographer and painter (born 1890)
- 1977 – Kurt Schuschnigg, Italian-Austrian lawyer and politician, 15th Federal Chancellor of Austria (born 1897)
- 1978 – Jim Jones, American cult leader, founded Peoples Temple (born 1931)
- 1978 – Leo Ryan, American soldier, educator, and politician (born 1925)
- 1979 – Freddie Fitzsimmons, American baseball player, coach, and manager (born 1901)
- 1980 – Conn Smythe, Canadian soldier, ice hockey player, and businessman (born 1895)
- 1984 – Mary Hamman, American journalist and author (born 1907)
- 1986 – Gia Carangi, American model (born 1960)
- 1987 – Jacques Anquetil, French cyclist (born 1934)
- 1991 – Gustáv Husák, Slovak lawyer and politician, 9th President of Czechoslovakia (born 1913)
- 1994 – Cab Calloway, American singer-songwriter and bandleader (The Cab Calloway Orchestra) (born 1907)
- 1994 – Anselm Franz, Austrian jet engine pioneer (born 1900)
- 1994 – Peter Ledger, Australian painter and illustrator (born 1945)
- 1995 – Miron Grindea, Romanian-English journalist (born 1909)
- 1998 – Tara Singh Hayer, Indian-Canadian journalist and publisher (born 1936)
- 1999 – Paul Bowles, American composer and author (born 1910)
- 1999 – Doug Sahm, American singer and guitarist (born 1941)
- 2001 – Walter Matuszczak, Polish-American football player 1939 All-America, 1941 New York Giants draft (born 1918)
- 2002 – James Coburn, American actor (born 1928)
- 2003 – Michael Kamen, American composer and conductor (born 1948)
- 2004 – Robert Bacher, American physicist and academic (born 1905)
- 2004 – Cy Coleman, American pianist and composer (born 1929)
- 2005 – Harold J. Stone, American actor (born 1911)
- 2009 – Red Robbins, American basketball player (born 1944)
- 2010 – Freddy Beras-Goico, Dominican comedian and television host (born 1940)
- 2010 – Brian G. Marsden, English-American astronomer and academic (born 1937)
- 2012 – Emilio Aragón Bermúdez, Spanish clown, singer, and accordion player (born 1929)
- 2012 – Phoebe Hearst Cooke, American businesswoman and philanthropist (born 1927)
- 2013 – Thomas Howard, American football player (born 1983)
- 2013 – S. R. D. Vaidyanathan, Indian nadaswaram player and composer (born 1929)
- 2013 – Ljubomir Vračarević, Serbian martial artist, founded Real Aikido (born 1947)
- 2013 – Peter Wintonick, Canadian director and producer (born 1953)
- 2014 – Dave Appell, American singer-songwriter and producer (born 1922)
- 2014 – Pepe Eliaschev, Argentinian journalist and author (born 1945)
- 2014 – Ahmad Lozi, Jordanian educator and politician, 48th Prime Minister of Jordan (born 1925)
- 2014 – C. Rudhraiya, Indian director and producer (born 1947)
- 2015 – Abdelhamid Abaaoud, Belgian-Moroccan terrorist (born 1987)
- 2015 – Dan Halldorson, Canadian-American golfer (born 1952)
- 2015 – Jonah Lomu, New Zealand rugby player (born 1975)
- 2016 – Sharon Jones, American soul and funk singer (born 1956)
- 2016 – Denton Cooley, American surgeon and scientist (born 1920)
- 2017 – Malcolm Young, Scottish-Australian hard rock guitarist (born 1953)
- 2020 – Kirby Morrow, Canadian actor, comedian, and writer (born 1973)
- 2022 – Tabassum, Indian actress and talk show host (born 1944)
- 2024 – Charles Dumont, French singer and composer (born 1929)
- 2024 – Arthur Frommer, American travel writer (born 1929)
- 2024 – Bob Love, American basketball player (born 1942)
- 2024 – Colin Petersen, Australian drummer, record producer and actor (born 1946)

== Holidays and observances ==
- Christian feast day:
  - Abhai of Hach (Syriac Orthodox Church)
  - Alphaeus and Zacchaeus
  - Barulas
  - Constant
  - Dedication of Saints Peter and Paul
  - Elizabeth of Hungary (Church of England)
  - Juthwara
  - Blessed Karolina Kózka
  - Leonardo Kimura
  - Mabyn (Roman Catholic Church and Anglicanism)
  - The main day of the Feast of the Virgen de Chiquinquirá or Chinita's Fair (Maracaibo, Venezuela)
  - Maudez (Mawes)
  - Nazarius (Nazaire)
  - Odo of Cluny
  - Romanus of Caesarea
  - Rose Philippine Duchesne
  - November 18 (Eastern Orthodox liturgics)
- Day of Army and Victory (Haiti)
- Independence Day (Morocco), celebrates the independence of Morocco from France and Spain in 1956.
- National Day (Oman)
- Proclamation Day of the Republic of Latvia celebrates the independence of Latvia from Russia in 1918.
- Remembrance Day of the Sacrifice of Vukovar in 1991 (Croatia)
