= Enugu (city) =

Capital city of Enugu state, Nigeria

Enugu Enụgwụ (Igbo)
- City
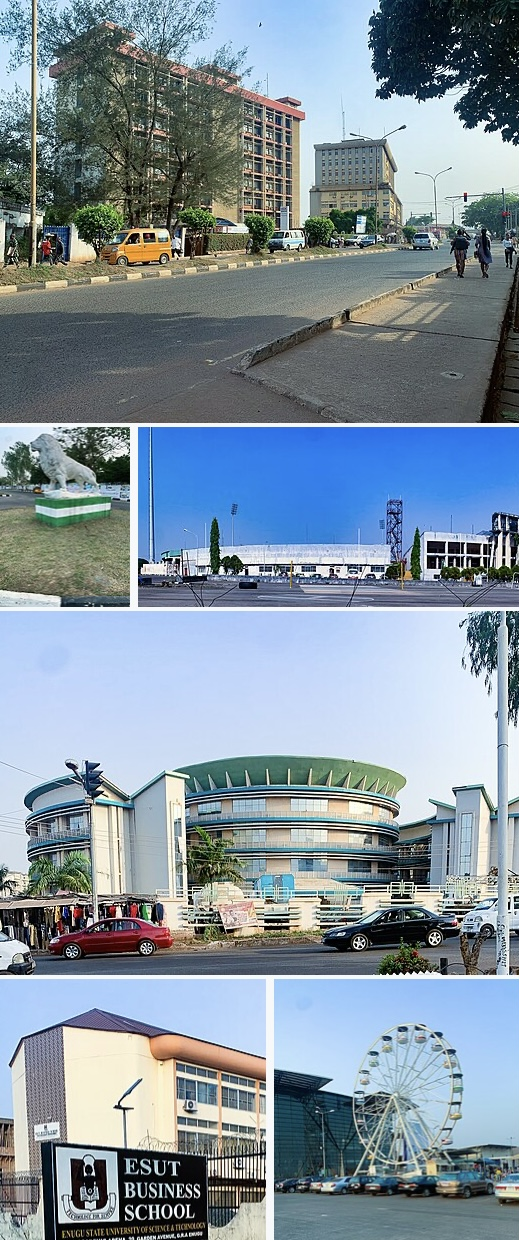
- Nicknames: Enugu, Capital of Enugu
- Motto: Coal City
- Enugu in Nigeria
- Coordinates: 6°27′10″N 7°30′40″E
- Country: Nigeria
- State: Enugu
- LGA: Enugu East, Enugu North, Enugu South
- Incorporated: in 1909
- Named for: its hilly geography
- Seat: Lion building

Government
  - Type: Executive Chairman-Council
  - Governing body: Local Government Council
  - Party: APC
  - Chairman: Ibenaku Onoh (Enugu North); Joel Onyemaechi (Enugu South); Belove Dan Anike (Enugu East)

Area
  - Total: 556 km^{2} (215 sq mi)
- Elevation: 180 m (590 ft)

Population (2022 census)
  - Total: 876,000
  - Rank: 9th
  - Density: 1,580/km^{2} (4,080/sq mi)
- Time zone: UTC+1 (WAT)
- Postcode: 400
- Area code: 02042
- Climate: Aw
- National language: Igbo
- Website: www.enugustate.gov.ng

Enugu (/eɪˈnuːɡuː/ ay-NOO-goo; Igbo: Enụgwụ) is the capital city of Enugu State in Nigeria. The city had a population of 876,000 (2024 estimate) spread across the three LGAs of Enugu East, Enugu North and Enugu South, according to the 2022 Nigerian census.

== History ==
=== Early history ===
Énugwú (Igbo verbalization of Enugu) is the capital city of Enugu State in Nigeria. It is located in southeastern part of Nigeria. The name Enugu is derived from the two Igbo words Énú Ụ́gwụ́, meaning "hill top", denoting the city's hilly geography. Enugu acquired township status in 1917 and was called Enugwu-Ngwo, but because of the rapid expansion towards areas owned by other indigenous communities, the city was renamed Enugu in 1928.

The first settlement in the Enugu area was the small Nike village of Ogui from present day Igala which was present since the era of the Atlantic Slave Trade. Nike in the Igbo language means "with strength or power". The Nike people acquired most of their lands through slave raiding, as the area was mostly unsettled. The Nike people used slaves as part of their defence strategy. They placed Slave camps at the edge of their territories so that it was harder for an enemy to access the free-born people.

The Nike were allied to the Aro people, who formed the Aro Confederacy (1690–1901). This Igbo organisation controlled slave trading in the Enugu area.

Numerous Aro people came to trade from Arochukwu in the south; the Hausa people came to trade from the north. The Hausa traders provided horses to the Nike, who used them for Igbo rituals. Both the Aro and Hausa regularly migrated back and forth to what is now the city of Enugu, and were considered foreigners to the area.

=== Industrialisation ===
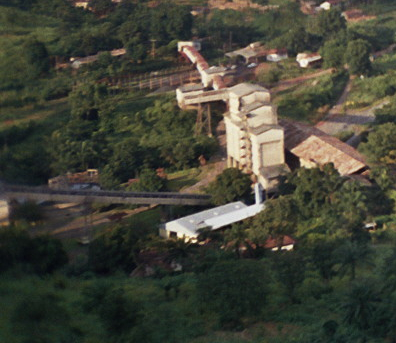
The Iva Valley coal mine

A British campaign to invade Arochukwu and open up the hinterland for British military and political rule was carried out in 1901. A war between the British and Aro officially started on 1 December 1901; it lasted until 24 March 1902 when the Aro were defeated.

The Aro Confederacy ended, and the British added the rest of Aro-dominated areas to The Colony and Protectorate of Southern Nigeria, declared in 1900.

Europeans first arrived in the Enugu area in 1903 when the British/Australian geologist Albert Ernest Kitson led an exploration of the Southern Nigeria Protectorate to search for especially valued mineral resources under the supervision of the Imperial Institute, London. By 1909 they found coal under the village of Enugwu Ngwo in the Udi area. By 1913 the coal was confirmed to be in quantities that would be viable commercially.

By 1914 the colonial government had merged the Northern and Southern Nigeria Protectorate to form the Colony and Protectorate of Nigeria.

In 1915 the British began talks with the indigenous people of the land that would become Enugu about its acquisition in order to lay the Eastern Line railway and to build a colliery. The first houses built in the area were in a temporary settlement consisting of Igbo traditional clay and earthwork housing inhabited by a W. J. Leck and some other Europeans on Hill-top. This was the only plain on the escarpment rolling before the jungled Milliken Hill. Historic former residences of the colonialists, known as the "Europeans quarters", still survive on the Hill-top. It is now an outskirt of Enugwu-Ngwo town.

As a result of industrialization, settlements sprang up in the area now known as Enugu. The settlement known as Ugwu Alfred (Igbo: Alfred's Hill) or "Alfred's Camp", was developed on a hillside and inhabited by Alfred Inoma (a leader of indigenous Coal labourers from Onitsha) and his labourers. Another settlement known as Ugwu Aaron (Igbo: Aaron's Hill) or "Aaron's Camp", was also developed on a hillside and inhabited by Aaron Nwaelo (a leader of indigenous Railway labourers from Ezeagu) and his labourers.

After the British acquired land here, Frederick Lugard, the Governor-General of Nigeria at the time, named the colliery built at the bottom of the Udi Hills as Enugu Coal Camp to distinguish it from Enugwu Ngwo which overlooks the city from atop a scarp to the west of Enugu.

The first coal mine in the Enugu area was the Udi mine; it opened in 1915, and closed two years later when it was replaced with the Iva Valley mine. Enugu became a major coal mining area, the only significant one in West Africa. The Eastern Line railway connecting Enugu with Port Harcourt was completed in 1916 in order to facilitate the export of coal through its seaport and the city was developed sole for this purpose.

Enugu became one of the few cities in West Africa created explicitly from contact with Europeans. By 1916 the colonial government designated parts of Enugu as reserved for Europeans. The area now known as the Government Reserved Area (GRA) was called the European Quarters, located north of the Ogbete River. To the south of the river was a section developed for African residents. The built-up area of Enugu comprised these two areas, and by 1917 the city officially gained township status. On the African side of the city, a rapid influx of migrant workers led to the development of squatter camps on the Udi Hills near the coal mines and the Iva Valley.

In 1929, Enugu became the administrative headquarters for the Southern Province under the post-World War II constitutions. With this, the number of government departments represented in the town increased tremendously. In 1938 Enugu became the administrative capital of the Eastern Region. The number of employed coal miners in Enugu grew from 6,000 (of mostly Udi men) in 1948 to 8,000 in 1958. Enugu's population rose sharply with its industrialisation; the population of the city reached 62,000 in 1952. Under colonial British rule, working conditions in Nigeria were harsh, characterized by regular physical punishment, forced acts of humiliation, and irregular payments of arrears owed to workers. In late 1949, local miners believed that large sums of arrears were owed to them, but were being withheld by the mines' management. These beliefs were fueled by local "Zikist", or nationalist, press. "Zikism" was a post World War II movement that was created out of admiration for Nnamdi Azikiwe who was a prominent nationalist of the National Council of Nigeria and the Cameroons (NCNC). Labour tensions in Enugu came to a head on 18 November 1949, when British police massacred striking miners, killing 21 and wounding 51 others. The massacre that came to be known as "The Iva Valley Shooting" fueled Zikist sentiments among most Nigerians, and especially amongst Eastern Nigerians. Multiple Zikist groups used the shooting to fuel their calls for independence, and to push the British imperial administration out of Nigeria. A detailed account of the incident was also published in the memoirs of the British Resident of Enugu at the time, James Stewart Smith.

=== Independence, war, and after ===
Enugu became a municipality in 1956 with Umaru Altine its first mayor. After four years passed, Nigeria gained its independence in 1960. On 27 May 1967 the Nigerian government divided the Western, Northern and Eastern Region into 12 states and Enugu was made the capital of the new East Central State. On 30 May 1967 Enugu was declared the capital of the short-lived Republic of Biafra, the latter created out of the eastern Nigerian states of East Central, Cross River and Rivers. Biafra was declared by Ojukwu because of Eastern Nigeria after their members were attacked injured and killed in a series of ethnic attacks launched by some other ethnic groups in other parts of the country following the first military coup executed by mostly Igbo Officers, in which top northern Nigerian leaders among others were assassinated. The main rivals of the mostly Igbo Eastern Nigerians were the Hausa/Fulani people of Northern Nigeria. A northern headed war on the secession (1967–1970) and continuous attacks on the Igbos in other part of Nigeria lead Igbos from northern and western Nigeria to return to their "native" areas in eastern Nigeria and Enugu became a destination. Radio Biafra, alternatively the Voice of Biafra (formerly the Eastern Nigerian Broadcasting Service), was based in Enugu; it was from here that the Biafran leader, Chukwuemeka Odumegwu Ojukwu, broadcast speeches and propaganda to Biafrans and Nigeria. Because of the war, Enugu witnessed a decrease in the number of non-Igbo, specifically non-eastern Nigerian residents. On 4 October 1967 the Nigerian military bombarded Enugu with artillery just outside its boundaries before capturing it a week later, shortly after this Umuahia became the new capital of the republic. Years after the Republic of Biafra reverted to Nigeria, Enugu is still regarded as the "Capital of Igboland".

Enugu resumed in 1970 as the capital of the East Central State after the republic was dissolved. On 3 February 1976 the East Central State was made into two new states, Imo and Anambra; there were then 19 states in Nigeria; Enugu was the capital of Anambra. On 27 August 1991 the military dictatorship of Ibrahim Babangida divided the old Anambra State into two new states, Enugu State and Anambra State. Enugu remained as the capital of the newly created Enugu State, while Awka became the capital of the new Anambra State.

== Geography ==
=== Topography ===
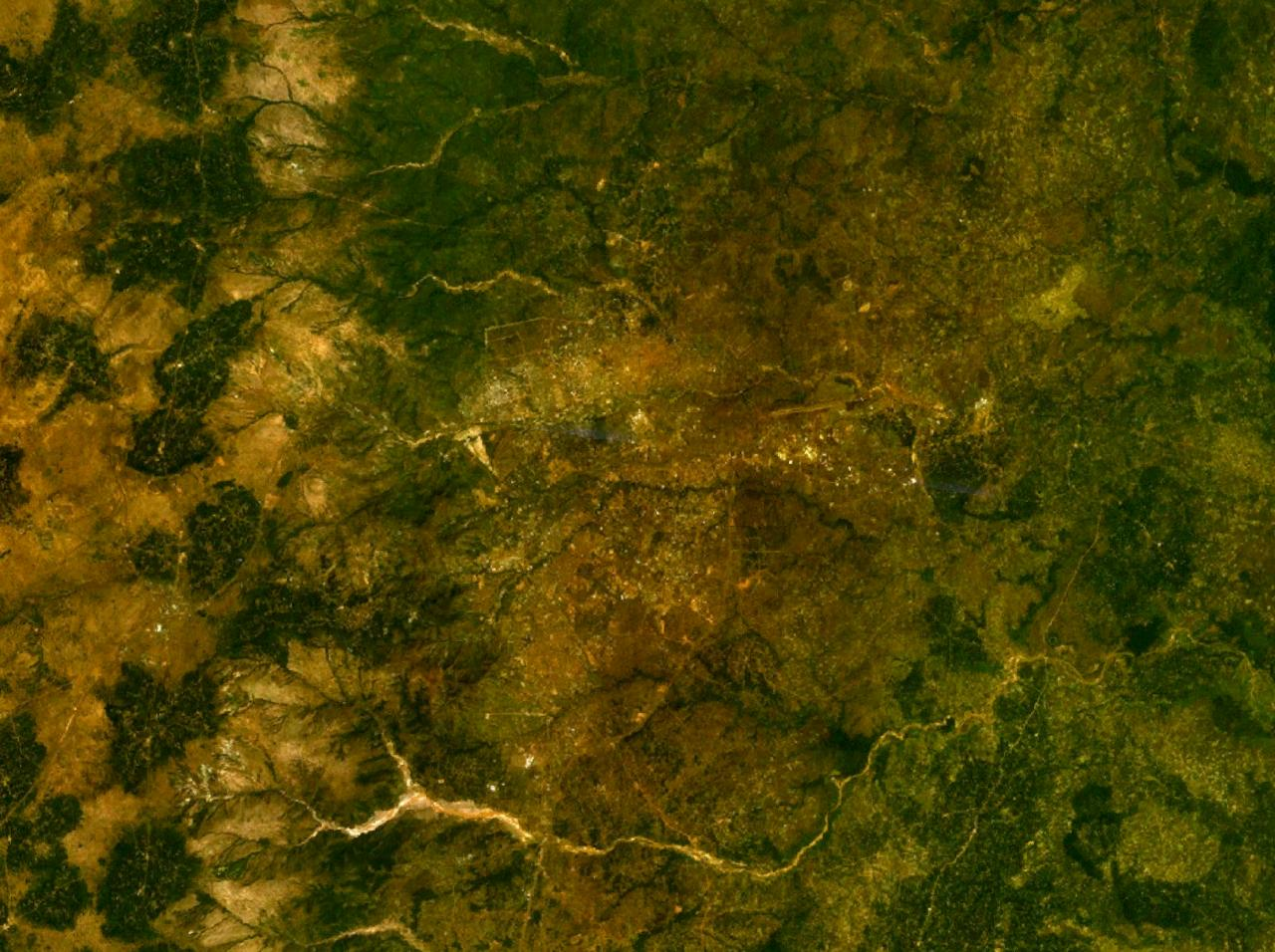
Satellite image of Enugu and other communities neighbouring it. The Enugu escarpment can be seen on the left where it has a lighter colour; the Nyaba River can be seen on the bottom.

Despite its name meaning hill top in the Igbo language, Enugu lies at the foot of an escarpment and not a hill. Enugu is located in the Cross River basin and the Benue trough and has the best developed coal in this area. Precambrian basement rock in this region is overlaid with sediments bearing coal from the Cretaceous and Tertiary age. Coal seams in the Enugu coal district measure between 1 and 2 metres (3.3 and 6.6 ft) in thickness and the reserves have been estimated to be more than 300 million tones. Enugu's hills at the extreme may reach an elevation of 1,000 metres (3,300 ft). Highlands surrounding Enugu for the most part are underlain by sandstone, while lowlands are underlain by shale. Much of the escarpment stretching from Enugu to Orlu has been ravaged by soil and gully erosion. Other geological features in Enugu include the Nike Lake near which the Nike Lake Resort has been built. The Ekulu, Asata, Ogbete, Aria, Idaw and Nyaba rivers are the six largest rivers located in the city. The Ekulu River is the largest body of water in Enugu urban and its reservoir contributes to part of the city's domestic water supply.

=== Water ===
Access to water has historically been a significant challenge in Enugu. Drilling of borehole in the city is usually an exercise in futility because of the geological formation which has coal large deposits of coal underground. The residents got water by buying from commercial water tanker drivers, digging water wells and harvesting and storing rain water. The Enugu State Water Corporation was established in 1991 to address these challenges and is responsible for providing portable water to the urban population of Enugu State. The corporation's primary focus is on serving residents in Enugu Urban and Nsukka Urban, covering areas of 85 square kilometres (33 sq mi) and 30 square kilometres (12 sq mi), respectively. Water production schemes in Enugu State are: Iva Valley Headworks designed to produce 4,500 cubic metres (5,900 cu yd) per day, Ajalli Owa Scheme with installed capacity of 77,000 cubic metres (101,000 cu yd) per day, Oji Augmentation Scheme that produces 50,000 cubic metres (65,000 cu yd) per day and Nsukka Scheme producing 19,000 cubic metres (25,000 cu yd) per day. Enugu's water supply infrastructure has not kept pace with its growing population. However, in 2021 the Enugu State government received N 68,748,000,000 (US$50,000,000) from French Development Agency, AFD, to support the state to revitalize the water schemes at 9th Mile Corner Nsude and Oji River. The Peter Mbah administration in November 2023 using the funds completed the water scheme at 9th Mile Corner Nsude, increasing the daily water production from an occasional 2,000,000 L (440,000 imp gal; 530,000 US gal) to 70,000,000 L (15,000,000 imp gal; 18,000,000 US gal), with the Oji River water scheme expected to add another 50,000,000 L (11,000,000 imp gal; 13,000,000 US gal) daily, bringing the total to 120,000,000 L (26,000,000 imp gal; 32,000,000 US gal) daily. Reticulation of water to the various buildings remains a challenge, though being continuously addressed by the administration, as aged asbestos pipes are being replaced with modern ductile pipes.

=== Climate ===
Enugu is located in a tropical rain forest zone with a derived savannah. The city has a tropical savanna climate (Köppen: Aw). Enugu's climate is humid, and this humidity is at its highest between March and November. For the whole of Enugu State the mean daily temperature is 27 °C (81 °F). As in the rest of West Africa, the rainy season and dry season are the only weather periods that recur in Enugu. The average annual rainfall in Enugu is around 2,000 millimetres (79 in), which arrives intermittently and becomes very heavy during the rainy season. Other weather conditions affecting the city include Harmattan, a dusty trade wind lasting a few weeks of December and January. Like the rest of Nigeria, Enugu is hot all year round.

Climate data for Enugu (1991-2020, extremes 1951-2020)
Month	Jan	Feb	Mar	Apr	May	Jun	Jul	Aug	Sep	Oct	Nov	Dec	Year
Record high °C (°F)	39.1 (102.4)	39.4 (102.9)	39.1 (102.4)	39.0 (102.2)	36.0 (96.8)	34.5 (94.1)	35.0 (95.0)	34.0 (93.2)	32.8 (91.0)	35.0 (95.0)	36.0 (96.8)	38.3 (100.9)	39.4 (102.9)
Mean daily maximum °C (°F)	33.9 (93.0)	35.3 (95.5)	35.2 (95.4)	33.6 (92.5)	32.2 (90.0)	30.9 (87.6)	29.8 (85.6)	29.5 (85.1)	30.2 (86.4)	31.1 (88.0)	32.8 (91.0)	33.4 (92.1)	32.3 (90.1)
Mean daily minimum °C (°F)	21.0 (69.8)	23.4 (74.1)	24.6 (76.3)	24.1 (75.4)	23.4 (74.1)	22.8 (73.0)	22.7 (72.9)	22.6 (72.7)	22.5 (72.5)	22.5 (72.5)	22.2 (72.0)	20.3 (68.5)	22.7 (72.9)
Record low °C (°F)	12.8 (55.0)	12.8 (55.0)	16.0 (60.8)	16.4 (61.5)	15.5 (59.9)	17.5 (63.5)	15.8 (60.4)	17.4 (63.3)	17.2 (63.0)	17.0 (62.6)	14.4 (57.9)	12.2 (54.0)	12.2 (54.0)
Average precipitation mm (inches)	8.7 (0.34)	14.0 (0.55)	55.3 (2.18)	158.8 (6.25)	259.2 (10.20)	276.2 (10.87)	287.0 (11.30)	258.7 (10.19)	296.8 (11.69)	218.1 (8.59)	32.0 (1.26)	12.5 (0.49)	1,877.3 (73.91)
Average precipitation days (≥ 1.0 mm)	0.6	1.1	3.3	7.7	12.4	13.6	17.2	16.1	17.8	13.4	2.0	0.6	105.7
Average relative humidity (%)	68.8	73.7	82.1	85.5	87.3	88.9	89.2	88.7	89.5	88.9	82.8	72.3	83.1
Mean monthly sunshine hours	186.0	175.2	182.9	183.0	186.0	153.0	117.8	117.8	123.0	173.6	219.0	217.0	2,032
Mean daily sunshine hours	6.0	6.2	5.9	6.1	6.0	5.1	3.8	3.8	4.1	5.6	7.3	7.0	5.6
Source 1: NOAA
Source 2: Deutscher Wetterdienst (sun 1961-1990)

=== Cityscape and architecture ===
The tallest building in Enugu's Central Business District (CBD) is the African Continental Bank (ACB) tower with six stories. The tower was built in the late 50s for the African Continental Bank Limited which was founded by Nnamdi Azikiwe who became the first president of Nigeria after the country's independence from the United Kingdom in October 1960. The opening of the building took place on 30 April 1959. Other tall buildings include the Hotel Presidential opened in August 1963. The seven-story building contains 100 rooms and is located in the Independence Layout. Hotel Presidential cost $2.5 million to build and was commissioned by the government of what was then the Eastern Region to serve visiting businessmen, officials and tourists. In the middle of Enugu is the Michael Okpara Square, dedicated to the premier of the former Eastern Region Michael Okpara. Beside the square is located the Enugu State Government House, Enugu State House of Assembly and Enugu State Judiciary Complex.

Enugu's coal mines are dotted around on the outskirts of the city, a majority of which are closed. The Colliery Camp mines are located in the Iva Valley which is near the neighboring town of Ngwo and the Hilltop of Enugu. The Iva Valley coal mine is accessed through the Iva Valley road linking Enugu with Ngwo. Other coal mines are located in the Ogbete and Coal Camp layouts; these mines are located on the periphery of the city near the Iva Valley as well.

Architectural design in Enugu's early years was in the hands of the British colonial administration; Enugu's architecture was consequently very European. English cottage housing and Victorian houses were used for housing Europeans and Nigerian colonial civil servants in the early 20th century until Europeans started trying to adapt their architecture to the tropical climate. Some other examples of these European styles are visible in churches of the colonial era, such as the Holy Ghost Cathedral with its Greco-Roman stained glass windows depicting Europeans. Enugu's roads were reflective of its British rule; much of the city's narrow roads in the GRA have been preserved dating back to the incorporation of the city itself. Low rent one bedroom flats in Enugu and other Nigerian cities are known as "face-me-I-face-you" for the way a group of flats face each other and form a square where a compound entrance is led into.

== Government ==
Enugu city covers three local government areas: Enugu East, Enugu North and Enugu South. A Local Government Council exists for each of these seats that manages sectors including primary education and health; an elected Executive Chairman and a group of elected Councilors form the Local Government Council that heads each Local Government Area. Enugu South is split between its rural and urban parts when electing an Executive Chairman. The Executive Chairmen include Paul Ogbe for Enugu South Urban, Theresa Egbo for Enugu South Rural, Emma Onoh for Enugu North, and Christopher Ugwu for Enugu East; these chairmen represent their LGA's in the Enugu State House of Assembly. The Ministry of Lands, Survey and Town Planning (at the state level) and the Local Planning Authority (at the local government level) are responsible for the administration of urban lands and town planning. Government House, Enugu is where the government of the state is based. On the federal level, the city of Enugu is split between two congressional areas; Enugu North/South represented by Chukwuegbo Ofor and Enugu East represented by Gilbert Nnaji; both representatives are in the People's Democratic Party (PDP) as his excellency Peter Mbah, the governor of Enugu State.

== Demographics ==
Population growth of Enugu
Year	Pop.
1921	3,170
1931	12,959
1953	62,764
1963	138,457
1982	349,873
1983	367,567
1984	385,735
1987	446,535
1991	407,756
2002	595,000
2006	722,664

According to the 2006 Nigerian census, the Enugu metropolitan area has an estimated population of 722,664. This estimate along with population estimates of other Nigerian cities have been disputed with accusations of population inflation and deflation in favour of the northern part of the country. The population of Enugu is predominantly Christian, as is the rest of southeastern Nigeria. Like the rest of Nigeria, most people in Enugu speak Nigerian English in addition to the dominant indigenous language of the area — in the case of Enugu, the dominant language is Igbo with minority groups speaking their own languages along with English and (often) Igbo. Along with standard Nigerian English, Pidgin English is commonly spoken, with the forms of English often being employed lingua francas to communicate across ethnic lines or even between speakers of disparate Igbo dialects. In cultural and linguistic terms, Enugu is within the northern cluster of the Igbo region which includes other communities like Agbani, Awka, Owo, Nike, and Nsukka.

As the city is within the broader cultural region of Igboland, the population of Enugu has historically been predominantly Igbo, with the ethnic composition reflecting the region's demographics. Early records, such as the 1929 census, indicated that the vast majority of Enugu's population were originally from the Eastern Region, with the ethnic Igbo community alone constituting 85% of the population. Other ethnic groups — such as the Hausa, Yoruba, and Fulani ethnic groups along with smaller groups from the Middle Belt and Niger Delta — also settled in the city with 10% of the population originating from the Western Region and 2% originating from the Northern Region while another 2% came from non-Igbo eastern communities in 1929. By the 1953 census, the Igbo community remained the vast majority at 87% of the population; however, various Igbo subgroups inhabited different parts of Enugu as of the mid-twentieth century including the Enugwu-Ngwo people (residing on the Hill-Top plain near the Milliken Hills on the west, with farmlands extending into the valleys), the Awkunanaw people (living in the Achara Layout and Uwani areas), and the Ogui Nike people (inhabited areas around Hotel Presidential as well as areas such as Obiagu, Ama-Igbo, Ihewuzi, and Onu-Asata) and other Nike groups (settled in regions like Abakpa, Iji-Nike, and Emene). However, decades of urban sprawl and migration — both internal movement within the city and the influx of new residents — have significantly altered these demographic patterns over time. While a large portion of the non-native groups of Enugu are ethnic Igbo migrants from other parts of the South East, the city's ethnic diversity increased in the mid-twentieth century with migration from other groups, but the civil war significantly shifted demographic patterns. Post-war Enugu saw a higher concentration of Igbo residents, as many inhabitants from other ethnic groups either left or were deterred from settling in the city due to the war's lingering effects on ethnic relations. Despite the challenges posed by ethnic diversity, Enugu has maintained a reputation for relatively peaceful coexistence among its various groups. Inter-ethnic relations have generally been harmonious, with residents working to manage tensions. Stereotyping and occasional conflicts have arisen, but they were often resolved through dialogue and community efforts. Relevant authorities also facilitate cooperation between Igbo and non-indigene communities while shared festivals, intermarriage, and religious commonalities — particularly among Hausa, Fulani, and Yoruba Muslims — contribute to this environment.

=== Crime ===
Enugu's crime rate rose in 2009 as kidnapping and armed robbery rates increased in southeastern Nigeria specifically between September and December. The Enugu State government sought to check the high kidnapping rates by passing a bill in February 2009 that made kidnapping by the use of a weapon a capital offence; the bill was passed by the Enugu House of Assembly unanimously. 1,088 arrests were made in the city between September and December 2009; 270 of these were in September, 303 were in October, 295 in November and 220 were in December. 477 of these detainees were accused of committing capital offences which included kidnapping. The motives of kidnappers in Enugu are primarily financial and some ransoms went into the millions of Naira. The Chief Press Secretary to the Governor of Enugu State, Dan Nwomeh, had his ransom set as high as ₦500 million (3.3 million US Dollars As of 26 June 2010), dropping to ₦200 million and then ₦50 million before he was released without a ransom being paid because of the refusal of the government to negotiate with the kidnappers. Much of the crime in Enugu and the rest of Nigeria has been attributed to unemployment.

== Culture ==
External image
- Enugu's Mmanwu masquerades in full costume

As a Northern Igbo city, Enugu shares cultural traits with its neighbouring towns. Two important Igbo traditional festivals take place in Enugu annually; the Mmanwu festival and the New yam festival. The Mmanwu festival takes place in November and features various types of masquerades that each have a name. This festival is held at the Nnamdi Azikiwe Stadium as a parade of carnival-like masquerades that are accompanied by music and it is supported by the Enugu Council of Arts and Culture. The second important Igbo festival, the New yam festival known as 'iwa ji', is held between August and October marking the harvesting and feasting of the new yam. The yam is a root vegetable that is the staple crop and a cultural symbol for the Igbo people. Recently created festivals include the Enugu Festival of Arts which is managed by the Enugu Council of Arts and Culture. The festival highlights African culture and traditions and it is here that the Enugu Council of Arts and Culture included the Mmanwu parade as part of the events. The Enugu Festival of Arts was started in 1986; it has modernised the Mmanwu festival by transferring it from its traditional village surroundings to the urban setting of Enugu. Diana, Princess of Wales was a notable spectator of Enugu's cultural shows when she visited the city in 1990. visitors to the city can enjoy a wide variety of the cities native delicacies especially its Famous Okpa "Okpa Enugu", Abacha a local delicacy made from cassava "African salad" fiofio, nkwobi and host of other delicacies like Nkwobi, pepper soup.

The tourism industry in Enugu, managed by the Enugu State Tourism Board (ESTB), is small; however, the state government recognises a variety of historic and recreational sites. These sites include places like the Udi Hills, from which the majority of Enugu city can be viewed. The Nike lake Resort in the outskirt of the city, the famous Iva Valley which served as residential quarters for European workers managing the Coal Mining activities. The Polo amusement park is a funfair that is among the first generation of public parks in the city; other parks in the city include the Murtala Muhammed Park. Enugu's former coal mines, Onyeama and Okpara, are open to public visits. Some other spots include: The Institute of Management and Technology (IMT) Sculptural Garden and Art Gallery, the Eastern Region Parliamentary Building, the Old Government Lodge, and Enugu Golf course. Enugu Zoo is another attraction in the city. It is divided into the botanical garden and the zoological section. A National Museum is located near Enugu at its north, although it receives few visitors. It is managed by National Commission for Museums and Monuments (NCMM). Other galleries include the Bona Gallery.

== Entertainment ==
=== Music ===
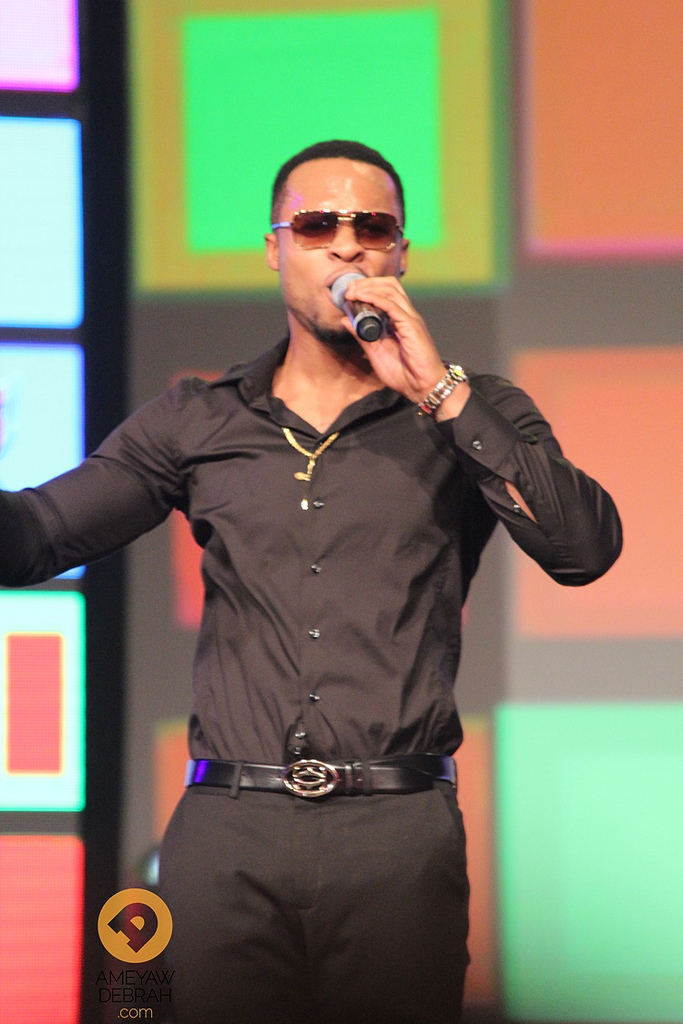
Flavour N'abania at the 2014 Africa Magic Viewers Choice Awards

Enugu became an important centre for Highlife music in Nigeria in the 1950s. The Igbo dominated version of the genre grew out of earlier "Igbo blues" or "palm wine music" and further spread in popularity to the Southern Cameroons where Enugu had considerable influence in arts and culture in towns such as Limbe, Tiko and Douala. Some prominent musicians with origins in Enugu include Sonny Okosun, an afrobeat musician who was born and raised in Enugu and joined his first band The Postmen that was based in the city in 1965; Celestine Ukwu joined Michael Ejeagha's Enugu based Paradise Rhythm Orchestra in 1962 before creating his own band and had a recreational club in the city after the Nigeria Civil War; other musicians include 2Face Idibia; a Hip hop/R&B musician who partly grew up and studied music in the city. Other notable musicians originating from Enugu include rapper Phyno, Slowdog, William Onyeabor, and highlife musician Flavour N'abania.

=== Media and literature ===
English-language newspapers published and sold in Enugu include the Daily Star, Evening Star, The Renaissance and New Renaissance. One of the earliest newspapers published in Enugu was the Eastern Sentinel published by Nnamdi Azikiwe's Zik Group in 1955, but failed in 1960. Among the city's television and radio stations are the Nigerian Television Authority's network affiliate (NTA Enugu) headquarters located at Independence Layout, Afia TV located at Coal City Garden Estate, Voice of the East TV and the Federal Radio Corporation of Nigeria (FRCN) network affiliate station (Radio Enugu) which broadcasts in English, Igbo, Efik, Ijaw and Tiv. Enugu State Broadcasting Service Television (ESBS-TV) is a state owned television broadcasting company which offers 18 hours of continuous broadcasting on weekends. Enugu, after Lagos is the preferred city for shooting films in Nigeria and a film production centre in the East. In 2007, Enugu hosted the first-ever film festival in the state, the Enugu International Film Festival. Held at Hotel Presidential, the festival's intent was to highlight Enugu as a "film making hub" in Africa including movie premiers and prizes for different film categories. Life In My City Art Festival was established in 2007 as an annual celebration of creativity, showcasing the work of young talents in Nigeria's art landscape. The festival culminates in a Grand Finale, featuring selected works of art from youth across the country, chosen from over 600 pieces exhibited annually in 11 different exhibition centers across Nigeria. In 2012, the festival was registered as a Trusteeship under the name Life In My City Art Initiative. The festival hosts a range of events, including a visual art competition, a pan-African photography contest known as Photo Africa, workshops for schoolchildren and art teachers, a multimedia workshop, and the Award and Gala Night. It has become one of the largest art events in Nigeria, bringing together young artists, patrons, scholars, gallery owners, and other stakeholders in the visual arts sector. Every year, over 3 million naira in prizes are awarded, making it one of the most prestigious and supportive platform for young Nigerian artists. Crater Literary Festival is an annual literary event founded in 2017 by Adachukwu Onwudiwe with its inaugural edition themed "Life in My City". Held in Enugu, Eastern Nigeria, the festival gathers writers, readers, publishers, artists, and art enthusiasts to celebrate Nigerian literature and the arts. On 1 November 2024, the Enugu Photo Festival held its first edition with the theme "Shades of Coal - Revisiting Time". Established in 2023 by the Enugu Photo Community led by Chidera Ifeakanwa Sam-Eze, the Enugu Photo Festival aims to preserve and promote the rich history and culture of Enugu and Eastern Nigeria through visual storytelling. Each year, the festival adopts a unique theme, with the 2024 theme, "Shades of Coal - Revisiting Time", commemorating Enugu's coal mining legacy and the 75th anniversary of the Iva Valley Coal Miners Massacre. The festival not only serves as a platform for local artists but also attracts cultural tourism, shedding light on societal issues and fostering conversations around Eastern Nigeria's heritage.

Some of Nigeria's well-known writers were born and have lived in the city of Enugu. Chinua Achebe, writer of Things Fall Apart lived in Enugu in 1958, the year the book was published. He again moved to the city during the Nigerian Civil War after escaping Lagos with his family. It was at this time that he met and became friends with Nigerian poet Christopher Okigbo where they started the publishing house Citadel Press, among its titles How the Dog was Domesticated and How the Leopard Got His Claws. Okigbo lived in Enugu during the early months of the Nigerian Civil War. His home in Hilltop contained many of his unpublished writings which were mostly destroyed by bombing early in the war. Chimamanda Ngozi Adichie, writer of Half of a Yellow Sun, a winner of the Orange Prize for Fiction in 2007, was born in Enugu in 1977 and grew up in Nsukka.

=== Sports ===
Enugu Rangers, are a first-division team of the Nigerian Premier League in Enugu, home to the Nnamdi Azikiwe Stadium. Former Rangers players include Jay-Jay Okocha and Taribo West. Enugu's main sports centre is the Nnamdi Azikiwe Stadium, named after Nnamdi Azikiwe, the first president of Nigeria. The stadium remained the centre of sports for the whole of the Eastern Region until the Nigerian Civil War broke out. At the war's end the stadium was refurbished. Enugu was a host for the 2009 FIFA U-17 World Cup games (24 October – 15 November) alongside Calabar and five other Nigerian cities with matches taking place at the Nnamdi Azikiwe Stadium. Its hosting of the FIFA U-17 World Cup benefited Enugu through the renovation of the Nnamdi Azikiwe Stadium, having had such things as a new artificial surface laid. City's Top flight Football Team Enugu Rangers won the Nigerian Professional Football League in 2016.

== Economy ==
Nicknamed the Coal City, Enugu's economy in the early 20th century depended on coal mining in the Udi plateau; this industry was the pushing force towards the city's growth. The Nigerian Coal Corporation has been based in Enugu since its creation in 1950 where it controlled coal mining. With the creation of the Eastern Line, Enugu was connected with the sea via Port Harcourt to its south and later connected to the city of Kaduna to Enugu's north. The Nigerian Civil War brought widespread devastation that forced a decline in coal production from damage or destruction of equipment. As of 2005 coal mining is no longer the major source of income and mines lay unused. Other minerals mined in Enugu include iron ore, limestone, fine clay, marble, and silica sand.

In Enugu most goods are sold in open markets or by street hawkers; a significant number of street hawkers in Nigeria are children. As of 2003, around 44 under-16-year-olds (equally boys and girls) hawk on every street on every hour in Enugu. There are three main urban markets in Enugu: Ogbete Market, Awkunanaw Market and New Market. New Market is a major market for the sale of garri. Ogbete market is patronised by merchants from all over the surrounding area, including merchants from cities like Onitsha, Aguleri, Abakaliki and Aba. In Ogebete market non-food goods are also sold. Brewing and soft-drink bottling are among other industries in the city; there is also a Mercedes assembly plant as well as the production and manufacturing of machinery, pottery, tiles, steel, cement, asbestos, petroleum, and pharmaceuticals. For a period of time Sosoliso Airlines had its head office on the grounds of Akanu Ibiam International Airport in Enugu.

The former Eastern Region was once famed for producing half the world's total output of palm kernels. Since the Nigerian Civil War production has markedly declined largely because the plantations and processing equipment were either damaged or destroyed. The production of other important cash crops such as cocoa, groundnut and groundnut oil, rubber, cassava, cotton and cotton seed and timber tumbled after the civil war and the subsequent oil boom years. Consequently, the area called Enugu State as well as the rest of Nigeria, which was once a self-sufficient net exporter in agricultural produce, must import food.

Enugu has also been a hub of entrepreneurial activity for many years. Born out of a passion for innovation and progress, the city has given rise to numerous successful businesses across various sectors. Notable among these are the Roban Group, Copen Group, Innoson Group, Fine Brothers, Digital Dreams Limited, Intercil Group, ANAMMCO, Nemel Pharmaceuticals, Emenite, and Albertina. These companies have not only contributed to the city's economic growth but have also created employment opportunities for its residents.

=== Tech and Innovation Ecosystem ===
Enugu has a tech startup ecosystem and is rated 4th in Nigeria and 9th in West Africa. It is home to over 20 startups that include Xend Finance, Linkskool School Management, Greenage Technologies, Digital Dreams Limited, Quiva Games and many more.

== Education ==
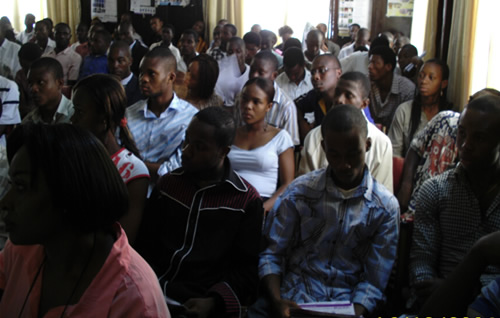
Students at a seminar in Enugu

Enugu has three main tertiary institutions: the Enugu State University of Science & Technology (ESUT); the University of Nigeria, Nsukka Campus (UNN) and Enugu Campus (UNEC); and the Institute of Management and Technology (IMT). Another notable tertiary institution in Enugu State is the Federal Cooperative College, Oji River (FCCO). Godfrey Okoye University, Caritas University, Renaissance University, Coal City university, Esut Business School. The city is also home to Our Saviour Institute of Science and Technology, a polytechnic, Marist Polytechnic and Bigard Memorial Seminary. Some notable secondary schools in Enugu include the College of the Immaculate Conception (CIC) built in 1940, Holy Rosary College (HRC) built in 1943, Daughters of Divine Love (DDL) Colliery Comprehensive Secondary school, Queen's Secondary School, Federal Government College, Royal Crown Academy, Nsukka and the University of Nigeria Secondary school. University Teaching Hospital (UNTH) Enugu, under the university of Nigeria, is another university located in the city.

== Healthcare ==
In Enugu, health care services can be obtained at several institutions including the ESUT (Enugu State University of Science and Technology) Teaching Hospital; University of Nigeria, Enugu, Teaching Hospital; Park Lane General Hospital in the GRA; PMC (Peenok Medical Center) located on Ziks Avenue in Uwani; Hansa Clinic on Awolowo Street in Uwani; Niger Foundation Hospital and Diagnostic Centre on Presidential Close in the Independence Layout; and the Ntasi Obi Ndi no n'Afufu Hospital organization located on Enuguabor Street in the Trans-Ekulu layout, among others. Some of the specialist hospitals in Enugu include the Psychiatric Hospital Enugu and the National Orthopaedic Hospital Enugu (NOHE).

Many of the hospitals in Enugu are privately run. The UNTH and the National Orthopaedic Hospital are among some of the government controlled hospitals in the city. The medical equipment for the UNTH was upgraded in 2009 as well as parts of the hospital which were renovated in the same year. Most hospitals in the city suffer from a poor standard of medical facilities available to them; many of the city's citizens travel abroad for medical care. However, hospitals have been aided by foreign organisations and by Enugu's community at home and abroad who have donated medicine and other medical equipment. The most developed government hospital in Enugu is the Park Lane Hospital. The governor has said that the state has bought some ambulance service vehicles in March 2010. Enugu State has established free medical care for pregnant women and for all children under 5 years of age in the state. The child healthcare programme, founded under the District Health System (DHS), was added to the states 2008 budget. Enugu State has a HIV/AIDS prevalence of 6.5%, one of the highest in the country.

== Transport ==
Enugu is located on the narrow-gauge Eastern Line railway linked to the city of Port Harcourt; the Enugu train station is by the side of the National Stadium; dating back to its coal-mining origins, it is located on Ogui Street. The main forms of transportation in the city are buses, taxi cabs and buses., Okada (motorcycles) once served as public transportation in the city until the state government banned them from this use in April 2009. Most transport enters and leaves the city through Enugu's Ogbete Motor Park, Garki Motor Park serves as a transport pick-up point as well. Unregistered taxis are known as Kabu Kabu and are differentiated with registered ones through the lack of yellow paint on the unregistered vehicles.

In 2009, Enugu introduced a taxi job scheme under 'Coal City Cabs' to help in the eradication of poverty in the city. 200 registered Nissan Sunny taxis, provided by the state government; and 200 registered Suzuki taxis, provided by the Umuchinemere Pro-Credit Micro Finance Bank, were given out on loan to unemployed citizens in the city who will operate as taxi drivers and will own the vehicles after payments are completed. 20 buses with the capacity for 82 passengers seated and standing were introduced as Coal City Shuttle buses on 13 March 2009 to run as public transport for Enugu urban.

The main airport in the state is the Akanu Ibiam International Airport which can be accessed by buses and taxis. Renovations began on 30 November 2009 to upgrade it to accommodate wide-bodied aircraft. These plans include extending the 2,400-metre (7,900 ft) runway by 600 metres (2,000 ft) to make it 3 kilometres (1.9 mi) long; the runway will be widened from 45 to 60 metres (148 to 197 ft). It is estimated that the project will cost ₦4.13bn (27.3 million US dollars as of 26 June 2010).

The A3, or the Enugu-Port Harcourt highway, was opened in the 1970s and links the two cities together by passing through Aba, a major urban settlement. The A3 goes further on past Enugu's north to link to the city of Jos via Makurdi. Two more highways, the A232 from Benin City, Asaba and Onitsha to Enugu's east and the A343 from Abakaliki to Enugu's west, makes Enugu the site of a major junction.

== See also ==
- Cinema of Nigeria
- People from Enugu
- Railway stations in Nigeria
- Waawa people, of Enugu State

== Bibliography ==
- Udo, Reuben K. (1970). Geographical Regions of Nigeria. University of California Press.
- Sklar, Richard L. (2004). Nigerian Political Parties: Power in an Emergent African Nation. Africa World Press. ISBN 978-1-59221-209-5.
- Coleman, James Smoot (1958). Nigeria: background to nationalism. University of California Press.
- Williams, Lizzie (2008). Nigeria: The Bradt Travel Guide. Bradt Travel Guides. ISBN 978-1-84162-239-2.
- Hudgens, Jim; Trillo, Richard (2003). The rough guide to West Africa (4 ed.). Rough Guides. ISBN 978-1-84353-118-0.
- Nigeria (1970). Nigeria handbook. Federal Ministry of Information.
- Ezenwa-Ohaeto (1997). Chinua Achebe: A Biography. Bloomington: Indiana University Press. ISBN 978-0-253-33342-1.
