= Mea Mater Elizabeth High School =

Private Nigerian secondary boarding school

Coordinates: 6°17′11.02″N 7°33′31.18″E

Information
- School type: Private boarding school
- Established: 2004; 22 years ago
- Principal: Mr. Jude Isienyi
- Years: 7-12
- Houses: red; blue; green; yellow

Mea Mater Elizabeth High School is a private Nigerian secondary school institution. It is a boarding school. The school opened in September 2004. It is located in the village of Ojiagu in Agbani, Enugu.

== School makeup ==
The principal is Mr. Jude Isienyi. The school is divided into the junior school, or year 7 to year 9, and the senior school, or year 10 to year 12. Students are divided into four houses; red, blue, green and yellow. Students come from all over Nigeria, such as Lagos, Port Harcourt, Abuja and Warri. International students who may attend Mea Mater come from all corners of the world, including the U.S., Canada, United Kingdom, Germany, Ireland, and Italy. There is an entrance examination outlet and center in Abuja. A student by the name Chinenye Amanze was presented an African leadership academy award. The school was also noted as one of the best performed schools in Africa in the year 2011.
