= The Persistence of Slavery =

2021 non-fiction book by Robin Phylisia Chapdelaine

The Persistence of Slavery: An Economic History of Child Trafficking in Nigeria
- Author: Robin Phylisia Chapdelaine
- Publisher: University of Massachusetts Press
- Publication date: 2021

The Persistence of Slavery: An Economic History of Child Trafficking in Nigeria is a non-fiction book by Robin Phylisia Chapdelaine, published in 2021 by the University of Massachusetts Press as part of their Childhoods series. The book discusses the history of child trafficking and child slavery in 20th century Southeastern Nigeria, especially amongst Igbo children, and Chapdelaine puts forth an argument that the practice of child labor was a contributing factor to the 1929 Women's War. She also discusses the practice of child pawning, a form of servitude common in domestic environments, where child was held in a form of indentured servitude until they paid off the interest on loan that had been given to the adult who had pawned them.

== General references ==
- Coe, Cati (2021-11-09). "Robin Phylisia Chapdelaine . The Persistence of Slavery: An Economic History of Child Trafficking in Nigeria ". The American Historical Review. 126 (3): 1351–1352. doi:10.1093/ahr/rhab476. ISSN 0002-8762.
- Chuku, Gloria (2023-06-01). "The Persistence of Slavery: An Economic History of Child Trafficking in Nigeria . By Robin Phylisia Chapdelaine". Journal of Social History. 56 (4): 905–907. doi:10.1093/jsh/shac046. hdl:11603/25737. ISSN 0022-4529.
- Kolapo, Femi J. (November 2021). "Child Trafficking after Abolition - The Persistence of Slavery: An Economic History of Child Trafficking in Nigeria By Robin Phylisia Chapdelaine. Amherst, MA: University of Massachusetts Press, 2020. Pp. 224. $26.95, paperback (ISBN: 9781625345240)". The Journal of African History. 62 (3): 450–452. doi:10.1017/S0021853721000608. ISSN 0021-8537.
- Whyte, Christine (2021). "The Persistence of Slavery: An Economic History of Child Trafficking in Nigeria by Robin Phylisia Chapdelaine (review)". The Journal of the History of Childhood and Youth. 14 (3): 461–463. ISSN 1941-3599.
