= Renaissance University =

Private university in Enugu State, Nigeria

- Motto: Ut Omnia Potestis (Latin)
- Motto in English: "You can be what you want to be"
- Type: Private
- Established: 2005
- Vice-Chancellor: Professor Thaddeus Chukwuka Eze
- Location: Ugbawka, Enugu State, Nigeria; 6.310°N 7.557°E
- Campus: Rural
- Website: www.rnu.edu.ng

Renaissance University is a private university licensed by the Federal Government of Nigeria in 2005. Its main campus is located in Ugbawka (Igbo: Ugbuoka) in Enugu State, Nigeria.

== Location ==
Renaissance University is located in Ugbawka (off Enugu-Port Harcourt Express Road en route Ebonyi State) in Nkanu East Local Government Area of Enugu State in Igboland.

The campus can be reached within 30 minutes by road from the capital city of Enugu. It is about an hour drive from Abia State University (Uturu), Ebonyi State University (Abakaliki) and the University of Nigeria, Nsukka. The commercial cities of Aba and Port Harcourt are between two hours and two and a half hours drive away.

It is one of two universities located in Nkanu land of Enugu State. The other is the Enugu State University of Science and Technology (ESUT) - the first state university of technology in Nigeria, located at Agbani in Nkanu West Local Government Area.

== Colleges ==
The university has three colleges:

- College of Natural and Applied Sciences

The College of Natural and Applied Sciences has five departments. They are Microbiology, Biochemistry, Industrial Chemistry, Computer Science and Industrial Physics.

- College of Management and Social Sciences

The College of Management and Social Sciences has eight departments. They are Economics, Mass Communication, Industrial Business Administration, Accountancy, History & International Relations, Psychology, Political Science and Banking & Finance.

- College of Law
