= Sitting on a man =

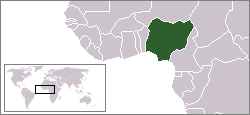
Nigeria

"Sitting on a man" is an Igbo method of public shaming employed by women against a man by convening upon his hut or workplace. Women may dance, sing, detail grievances with his behavior, beat on the walls of his home with pestles, or tear the roof from his home.

The practice is also referred to as "making war on" a man and may be employed against women as well. "Sitting on a man," along with strikes and various other resistance methods, ultimately functioned as a tool for women to maintain the balance of both social and political power throughout pre-colonial times.

== History ==
Pre-colonialism in Igboland

The Igbo political system was built on collectivism. They did not distribute power by force amongst one another. In the Igbo community, they did not believe in authority or power being specialized within their political institution. Because of their scattered community, it was easier for them to work as a union on political matters they faced within the village. Igbo tradition was based on holding village assemblies where they would discuss concerns and mutually agree on decisions for solutions. Factors that played into choosing leaders within their political system included finding candidates who lived in good faith, were generous, and were intellectual speakers (persuasive and influential speech). Men and women were both able to be leaders; however, women were at a disadvantage to men because of their patrilineage. Women could achieve status through their own accomplishments, even though men were able to gain resources easily. Additionally, they were able to advance in their rankings amongst other women, whereas men instantly developed status from birth. Even though it was rare for most women to obtain prestige, there was no official limitation of power for women.

Women in Politics

Igbo women had a very strong presence in the traditional political world. The Igbo people did not have stipulations regarding who could speak up and who could not. Any adult that had something valuable to say in a conversation, had the right to do so. Women were given rights based on their achievement, not their husbands accomplishments, but rather based on what they brought to the table. Igbo women were not able to speak on all subjects of matter, although they could speak about things that concerned them and other women. This was a rare circumstance, but still accepted in their society by invitation.

Women were still seen as second to men, even though they had some power and influence to speak on things that concerned them. Due to the fact that the wealth was solely based on men and their status within their community, women did not hold as much high status as men who had that political advantage over women. Most of the political standings were based on the patriarchal part of the women's families, so if there was no power within that part, they also did not have much power. After colonialism, women's meetings were put into categories like “mikiri” and “mitiri”.

After colonialism, women's meetings were put into categories like “Mikiri” and “Mitiri”. In "Mikiri" women were able to form all of their talents regarding politics among egalitarian people. Most of the times, they were discussing things they were interested in and could relate to with one another. Those things being: a farmer, mother, wife, trader, etc. and most times men did not agree with their views, but that did not stop them. The most important part of the "mikiri" meetings was the part about maintaining the most prominent act by women, which was trading. They established all of the logistics for trading, and if throughout this process the younger men could not be controlled surrounding their opinions, the women would rebut through strikes and boycotts which soon became known as "sitting on a man". There were multiple reasons a man could be subjected to the practice of "sitting on a man". If a man was found mistreating his wife, allowing his cows to eat the women's crops, breaking the rules of the market, or causing marital disputes, women would collectively consult with the mikiri (a forum which gave women the opportunity to gather for political, kinship, and market regulation issues) and if it gave support to the woman making the grievance, and they would employ the practice. Women would wear ferns on their heads and don loincloths. They would paint their faces with charcoal and carry sticks wreathed with palm fronds. Such a display of solidarity among women reinforced their influential role in society, offered access to autonomy throughout pre-colonial times, and lent itself as an effective measure to enact change.

== Colonial rule ==
=== Resistance ===
In the early twentieth century, women in Colonial Nigeria organized protests in response to political reforms regarding the Native Administration. "Sitting" on Warrant Chiefs was a prominent method of resistance. The Women's War was a significant demonstration of the adaptation of "sitting on a man" in efforts of resistance from imposed indirect rule in Colonial Nigeria. Protests would often consist of singing and dancing around homes and offices, invading personal spaces, and other actions which demanded the attention of the Warrant Chiefs. Wives of the local colonial representatives were often disturbed by this form of protest and aided in encouraging Warrant Chiefs to adhere to the requests and demands of the women. "Sitting on the Warrants," became a widespread colonial resistance tactic utilized by women in Nigeria.

=== Effects ===
During pre-colonial times, Igbo women held significant social and political standings, while still second to men. This allowed them to engage and influence the politics of their village in some shape or form. During colonial rule, however, the idea of excluding women from political settings and activities, despite resistance, grew among the Igbo people. The missionaries who had come to the region had begun to change the role of women in the Igbo society as their purpose was to train the women to be good Christian wives and mothers first and foremost. These Christian values also prohibited the use of Pagan rituals which included the Mikiri, taking away the one way in which Igbo women would traditionally engage in Politics and created a form of invisibility that left them unable to air their grievances. Politics were seen as the realm of men and any woman who could engage was seen as having the "brain of a man," which was considered very rare. Schooling became a large part of Igbo life as well as necessary for a political career and, unfortunately, most young girls were often overlooked in favor of the boys in the family. Those that did go to school were not given the same education as their male counterparts. Instead of being taught anything that could further a career in politics, they were taught European domestic skills and the Bible. The missionaries were not against women in politics as many supported women's suffrage, but in Africa, the church was the biggest priority was creating Christian Families which did not prioritize women politicians at the time.

By altering the social institutions, it negatively affected women's rights and status in society by de-legitimizing their means of influence. The criminalization of the Mikiri was not necessarily deliberate, as European officials and missionaries were unaware of the functions and implications of the practice as they were socialized with a restrictive ideology that had no place for women to engage in politics. Unfortunately, by disturbing women's means of balancing power, colonial rule detrimentally affected Igbo gender relations and societal structures. Women no longer had the ability to affect the way that trade was performed or even defend themselves against any form of abuse enacted from the men of their villages. This left many Igbo women in a vulnerable state of subservience and created a society where their traditional roles had become undone.
