= Nwanyeruwa =

Igbo woman living in colonial Nigeria, best known for her role in the Aba Women's Riots

Nwanyeruwa //, also known as Madame Nwanyeruwa, was an Igbo woman living in colonial Nigeria who gained prominence for her role in the ogu umunwanyi or Women's War of 1929. The war stemmed from the reluctance of Igbo women to be taxed amidst the economic hardships of the Great Depression. After a scuffle with Emeruwa, a messenger of the male Igbo Warrant Officer, Okogu, Nwanyeruwa and over 10,000 Igbo women "made war" against the British colonial and native authorities. While the protest did not result in much concrete changes or acceptance of the women's demands, it did result in women being involved in the colonial Nigerian political system. Nwanyeruwa's actions have been appraised by several historians, who cite her actions as an important milestone in the history of African nationalism.

== Early life ==
Although her date of birth and location of birth is unknown, it has been speculated by some historians that Nwanyeruwa was born in Igboland, a region which covers most of Southeast Nigeria. Nwanyeruwa was a woman of the Oloko region in Nigeria. As the typical gender roles of the Igbo culture were reversed as opposed to Western culture, Nwanyeruwa essentially acted as the paramount authority within the home. Sometime before 1929, Nwanyeruwa had married an Igbo man named Ojim, who had died some time before that year.

== Role in the Women's War ==
Ogu umunwanyi or the Women's War was sparked by a dispute between Nwanyeruwa and a man, Mark Emereuwa, who was helping to make a census of the people living in the town controlled by the Warrant Chief, Okugo. Nwanyeruwa was of Ngwa ancestry, and had been married in the town of Oloko. In Oloko, the census was related to taxation, and women in the area were worried about who would tax them, especially during the period of hyperinflation in the late 1920s. The financial crash of 1929 impeded women's ability to trade and produce so they sought assurance from the colonial government that they would not to be required to pay taxes. Faced with a halt in their political demands, the women settled that they would not pay taxes nor have their property appraised.

On the morning of November 18, Emereuwa arrived at Nwanyereuwa's house and approached her, since her husband Ojim had already died. He told the widow to "count her goats, sheep and people." Since Nwanyeruwa understood this to mean, "How many of these things do you have so we can tax you based on them", she was angry. She replied by saying "Was your widowed mother counted?," meaning "that women don't pay tax in traditional Igbo society." The two exchanged angry words, and Emeruwa grabbed Nwanyeruwa by the throat. Nwanyeruwa let out a traditional cry of grieviance and then marched to the town square to discuss the incident with other women who happened to be holding a meeting to discuss the issue of taxing women. Believing they would be taxed, based on Nwanyeruwa's account, the Oloko women invited other women (by sending palm fronds) from other areas in the Bende District, as well as from Umuahia and Ngwa. They gathered nearly 10,000 women who protested at the office of Warrant Chief Okugo, demanding his resignation and calling for a trial.

As a result of the protests, the position of women in society was greatly improved. In some areas, women were able to replace the Warrant Chiefs. Women were also appointed to serve on the Native Courts. After the Women's war, women's movements were very strong in Ngwaland, many events in the 1930s, 40s and 50s were inspired by the Women's War, including the Tax Protests of 1938, the Oil Mill Protests of the 1940s in Owerri and Calabar Provinces and the Tax Revolt in Aba and Onitsha in 1956.

== Legacy ==
Nwanyeruwa, along with other women of the Oloko village inspired women in other Nigerian villages to start their own political movements as well. Nwanyeruwa's role in the Women's War was one in a series of actions which acted as a catalyst for social and political change in Nigerian history, aiding the nascent African nationalist movement in the region and the movement for independence, which culminated in independence being granted in 1960. Her actions marked a milestone in both African nationalism and women's rights in Africa.
