= Ekulu River =

River in Nigeria

Coordinates: 6°29′N 7°33′E

The River Ekulu is a 25-kilometre (16 mi) long river and the largest body of water in the city of Enugu in Enugu State, southeastern Nigeria, and it originates in the same city as well.

== Pollution ==
The Ekulu River basin is entirely within the built-up areas of Enugu and as a result, a wide range of economic and human activities generate pollutants that pollute the river on a daily basis as the river serves as a contains wastewater.
