= Ikonnia =

Nigerian woman who protested against British colonial rule

Ikonnia was a Nigerian woman who protested against British colonial rule and their Warrant Chief System. Her most notable and famous contribution was her role in the Aba Women's War of 1929.

== Indirect rule ==
Ikonnia came of age in the context of indirect rule, a system that Sir Frederick Lugard introduced to Nigeria in 1912, where British colonial rule transformed the state of Nigeria. Igbo political life was organized around collective rule. Colonial authorities however, created a centralized administration through indirect rule, a system where colonial officials governed through selected local leaders or those who the British perceived as authorities. This system distorted existing political institutions because colonial officials empowered leaders who did not previously hold such authority. While some Warrant Chiefs were already local leaders, many were opportunistic young men whose power rested on colonial support, making them agents of British rule rather than representative of the people.

== Aba Women's War 1929 ==
=== Causes ===
Ikonnia is most notable for her participation in the Aba Women's War of 1929. In the era leading to this conflict, the women's main weapon in protest was “sitting on a man,” where they would gather at the compound of a man who wronged them. They would dance and sing songs which detailed their grievances against him, even calling his manhood into question. They would bang on his hut with pestles that were used to pound yams, and sometimes demolish his hut or plaster it with mud. These women would stay throughout the day and into the night, until the man repented. At the time, this was legitimate and no man would consider intervening.

In November 1929, women in Oloko village, where Ikonnia lived, feared that the colonial government sought to tax women, when only men had been counted and taxed previously. Anxiety among market women, like Ikonnia, intensified as the rumors about taxation spread. To prepare for the possibilities of tax reassessment, Oloko women, led by Ikonnia, and others, organized a meeting in the town market to determine how to handle a colonial tax on women. These women chose to oppose the counting of women through protest as they wanted to preserve their culture and stop what the colonial government forced on their community. This fear of taxation combined with their resentment of the Warrant chiefs led to the Aba Women's War.

Some historians argue that taxation served as a rallying cry for these women to band together to protest against colonial rule across the region. In order for them to be successful they knew they needed an “ohandum” movement, a movement that rallied all women together against a common enemy: the British Colonial government. Ikonnia and other leaders used the rumor of taxation as the means to mobilize these women to oppose British rule. In many ways, taxation rumors were only a part of a long list of grievances the Igbo women had, these rumors were the final straw that rallied women into action. This uprising, characterized by grassroots mobilization, acquired formal organization structure from the leadership provided by Ikonnia and her two counterparts Nwannedia and Nwugo.

=== Events ===
With Ikonnia as one of the primary leaders, she was able to rally the Oloko women together. The protests started peacefully with participating women sitting outside district offices. Once the women realized their traditional practice of “sitting on a man” was ineffective at these imperial offices, their anger turned towards the Warrant Chiefs, who authorized this tax. The women decided that they no longer wanted Warrant Chiefs leading them, so they took their protest to the men's houses.

Ikonnia was angry when she heard news on Nwanyeruwa's account about Chief Okugo's reaction to the women who voiced their concerns with taxation. Ikonnia demanded the removal of Chief Okugo of Oloko village. Her leadership led to his trial and conviction of assault, requiring him to turn in his cap of authority to the British, protecting women from the threat of taxation.

In the village of Umunhia, women were protesting against palm production and Ikonnia convinced them to take a breath since protesting would not decrease prices. The police commissioner and the district officer were both impressed by Ikonnia actions in this matter. At different locations, women destroyed property and British officials noted that the women were acting like “savages.” In response to these growing protests, they deployed troops who were ordered to shoot into the crowd, leading to the death of over fifty women and fifty more wounded; despite the women being nonviolent. Following this incident more women joined the cause, leading to Warrant Chiefs stepping down. Culminating in Britain's decision to remove the corrupt system of Warrant Chiefs in Nigeria.
