= Agbani =

Coordinates: 6.310°N 7.557°E

- Town
- Interactive map of Agbani
- Country: Nigeria
- State: Enugu State
- Local Government Area: Nkanu West
- National language: Igbo

Agbani is a town located in Nkanu West Local Government area of Enugu State, Nigeria.

== Education ==
Learning institutions include Nigerian Law School, Enugu State University of Science and Technology, Renaissance University, Mea Mater School, and Airforce School., Lionsden Athletics Club, Powered by Nnaji Family Foundation

Agbani is referred to as a student town because of the year round presence of students.

== Infrastructure ==
It is home to Eke Market. The city hosts commercial Banks, churches, building material market, and a good road network. It also has a sport facility at the Lionsden Athletics Club, Powered by the Nnaji Family Foundation. The facility has an ultramodern gym, innovation lab., swimming pool, juice bar, table-tennis, and a large chess board

== Geography ==
It originally comprises 8 villages, before political creation of autonomous communities: Uwani Amakpu, Amiyi Amakpu, Amafor Amakpu, Obeagu Amakpu, Ndibinegu Amakpu, Umuoyida Amakpu, Ogbeke, and Mbogodo.

== Notables ==
- Dr. Chimaroke Nnamani, former executive governor of Enugu State.
- Prince Jefferson Nnamani is a Non-Executive Director at Total Energies.
- Chief Onyemuche Nnamani, former SSG of Enugu State and CEO of AutoStar.
- Barr. David Ogbodo Esq. (Chinyelugo) oil executive and former Special Assistant to Prof.Jubril Aminu, the Minister of Petroleum under Gen.Babangida.
- Barr. Ifeanyi Nwoga, former Attorney-General of Enugu State and Managing Partner
- Ifeanyi Nwoga and Associates.
- Col. Issac Nnonah, Special Adviser to Gen. Babangida and Chairman, Onahsons Group Limited.
- Chief Sam Ejiofor, former Commissioner.
- Zeke Nnaji, Denver Nuggets, National Basketball Association (NBA)
