= Women's War =

1929 riots in Colonial Nigeria

- Date: November 1929 – January 1930
- Location: Colonial Nigeria
- Caused by: Protest against the Warrant Chiefs; Introduction of new taxes; Low prices of agricultural products following the Great Depression
- Goals: End of warrant chief system; Replacement of warrant chiefs with clan heads appointed by Nigerians rather than the British
- Methods: Sitting
- Result: Women were also appointed to serve on the Native Courts

Parties
Igbo women	British authorities

Lead figures
Nwanyeruwa; Ikonnia; Nwannedia; Nwugo	

Number
10,000 women	

Casualties and losses
55 killed	

The Women's War (Igbo: Ogu Umunwanyi; Ibibio and Annang: Ekong Iban) was a period of unrest in colonial Nigeria in November 1929. The protests broke out when thousands of Igbo women from the Bende District, Umuahia and other places in Nigeria traveled to the town of Oloko to protest against the warrant chiefs, local men appointed by British colonial authorities to serve as administrative representatives and had no precedent in Igbo tradition, whom they accused of restricting the role of women in the government. The protest encompassed women from six ethnic groups (Igbo, Ibibio, Andoni, Ogoni, Efik, and Ijaw).

The term war in this context did not refer to combat but instead referenced the Igbo women's practice of 'making war on a man' (or 'sitting on a man'), a form of public shaming. It was organised and led by the rural women of Owerri and Calabar provinces. The modus operandi of the protests involved 'sit-in' by the women. During the events, many warrant chiefs were forced to resign, and 16 Native Courts were attacked, most of which were destroyed. It was the first major revolt by women in West Africa.

In 1930, the colonial government abolished the system of warrant chieftains, and appointed women to the Native Court system. These reforms were built upon by African women and have been seen as a prelude to the emergence of mass African nationalism.

== Causes ==
The event that ultimately led to the war was the introduction of direct taxation. In April 1927, the colonial government in Nigeria took measures to enforce the Native Revenue (Amendment) Ordinance. A colonial resident, W. E. Hunt, was commissioned by the lieutenant governor of Nigeria to explain the provisions and objects of the new ordinance to the people throughout the five provinces in the Eastern Region. This was to prepare the ground for the introduction of direct taxation due to take effect in April 1928. Direct taxation on men was introduced in 1928 without major incidents. In September 1929, Captain J. Cook, an assistant District Officer, was sent to take over the Bende division temporarily. Upon taking over, Cook found the original nominal rolls for taxation purposes inadequate because they did not include details of the number of wives, children, and livestock in each household. He set about revising the nominal roll. This exercise brought the colonial authorities into direct conflict with women in Eastern Nigeria.

The announcement of Cook's intention to revise the nominal roll was made to a few chiefs in Oloko Native Court and the counting began about October 14, 1929. The women of Oloko suspected that the enumeration exercise was a prelude to the extension of direct taxation, which had been imposed on the men the previous year. The financial crash of 1929 impeded women's ability to trade and produce so they sought assurance from the colonial government that they would not be required to pay taxes. Faced with a halt in their political demands, the women settled that they would not pay taxes nor have their property appraised.

== Events ==
On the morning of November 18, the Aba Women's War was sparked by a dispute between a woman named Nwanyeruwa and a man, Mark Emereuwa, who was helping to make a census of the people living in the town controlled by the warrant chief Okugo. He instructed her to count her goats, sheep, and people, which she understood as preparation for taxing her. She replied, "Was your widowed mother counted?", invoking the Igbo tradition that women do not pay tax. The two exchanged angry words, and Emereuwa grabbed her by the throat. Nwanyeruwa went to the town square, where women were already meeting to discuss the threat of taxation, and relayed the incident. The women sent palm-oil leaves to summon others from the Bende District, Umuahia, and Ngwa, gathering nearly 10,000 women who protested at the office of warrant chief Okugo, demanding his resignation and calling for a trial.

The protest was led by three women known as the Oloko Trio: Ikonnia, Nwannedia, and Nwugo, who were known for their persuasion, intelligence and passion. When protests became tense, it was often these three who were able to de-escalate the situation, preventing violence. However, after two women were killed while blocking roads as a form of protest, the trio was not able to calm the situation, and the police and army were sent to the town.

Nwanyeruwa helped keep the early protests nonviolent, as women used song, dance, and "sitting" on the warrant chiefs to pressure them to resign. As the revolt spread, other groups adopted similar tactics. Some came to Nwanyeruwa to get written statements of the protests demands which she summarized as "women will not pay tax till the world ends [and] Chiefs were not to exist any more." However, as the revolt spread, many women rioted and attacked Chiefs, destroying their homes, and the movement came to be seen as violent.

The rebellion extended over six thousand square miles containing all of Owerri and Calabar Provinces, home to roughly two million people. Until the end of December 1929, when colonial troops restored order, ten native courts were destroyed, a number of others were damaged, houses of native court personnel were attacked, and European factories at Imo River, Aba, Mbawsi, and Amata were looted. Women attacked prisons and released prisoners. By the time order was restored, about fifty-five women were killed by the colonial troops. The last soldiers left Owerri on 27 December 1929, and the last patrol in Abak Division withdrew on 9 January 1930. By 10 January 1930, the revolt was regarded as successfully suppressed. Throughout late December 1929 and early January 1930, more than thirty collective punishment inquiries were carried out. It is generally believed, according to Nina Mba, that this event marked the end of the women's activities because the new administration under Governor Donald Cameron took into account some of the women's recommendations in revising the structure of the Native Administration.

== Aftermath ==
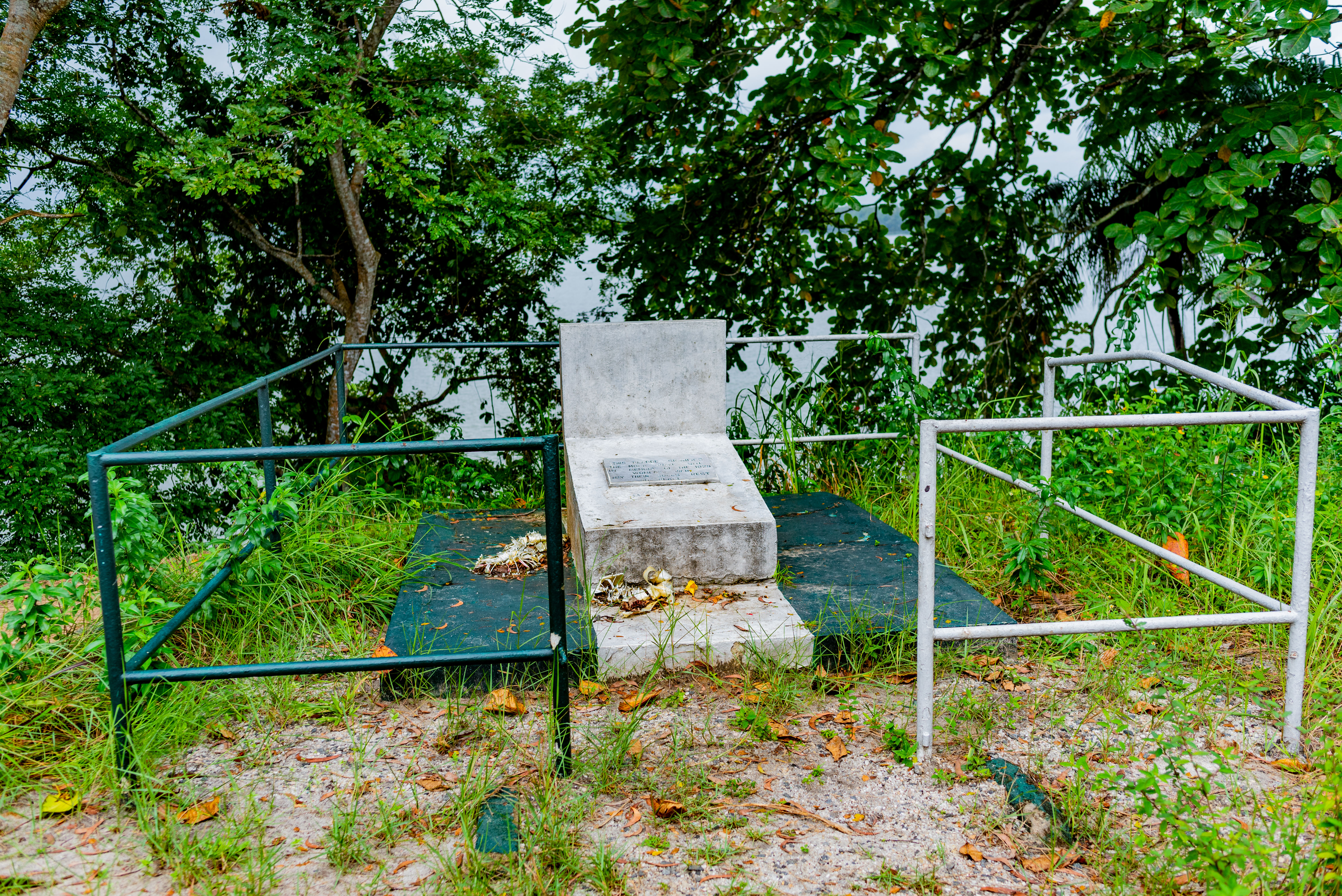
"Mock grave side" of in memory of the 1929 Women's War

By the time order was restored, approximately 55 women had been killed by colonial troops, and more than 30 punishment inquiries were carried out across the region. The British colonial government established the Aba Commission of Inquiry, led by Governor Graeme Thompson in March 1930 to investigate the causes of the disturbances. The commission held public sittings for thirty-eight days at various locations in the Owerri and Calabar Provinces and interviewed 485 witnesses, of whom only about 103 were women, the remainder consisted of local men and British administrative officials. The Commission's findings ended up leading to significant administrative reforms, such as the abolition of the warrant chief system, which was replaced with court tribunals that incorporated local forms of governance. For the first time, women were appointed to the Native Court system.

The women were able to transform "traditional methods for networking and expressing disapproval" into powerful mechanisms that successfully challenged and disrupted the local colonial administration. The Women's War is seen as the historical dividing point in British colonial administration in Nigeria with far reaching implications. The Women's War was also instrumental in marking the rise of gender ideology, offering women who were not married to the elites the opportunity to engage in social actions.

After the Women's War, women's movements grew significantly stronger in Ngwaland. Many events in the 1930s, 1940s, and 1950s were inspired by the revolt, including the Tax Protests of 1938, the Oil Mill Protests of the 1940s in Owerri and Calabar Provinces, and the Tax Revolt in Aba and Onitsha in 1956. On two occasions district officers were called and local military and paramilitary forces ordered to break up the protests. During these occasions, at least 50 women were shot dead and 50 more wounded. The women themselves never seriously injured anybody against whom they were protesting, nor any of the forces who broke up those protests.

Mary Okezie, the only woman to submit a memo of grievance to the Aba Commission of Inquiry in 1930, later founded and led the Ngwa Women's Association.

== Other major figures ==
- Mary of Ogu Ndem (Mary of the Women's War)
- Ihejilemebi Ibe of Umuokirika Village
- Mary Okezie

== Means of protest/protest strategies ==
A major tactic in the protests was what is known as "sitting". "Sitting on a man" or "making war on a man" was a long-held tradition used as the women's main weapon when faced with injustices in their society. Women would gather at the compound of the man in question and sing and dance while detailing the women's grievances against him. When it came to the warrant chiefs, along with singing and dancing around the houses and offices, the women would follow their every move, invading their space and forcing the men to pay attention. The wives of the warrant chiefs were often disturbed, and they too put pressure on the warrants to listen to the demands of the women.

== Name discrepancy ==
The event goes by many different names, including (among other names) Aba Women's Riots of 1929, the Aba Women's War, and the Women's Market Rebellion of 1929. It is usually referred to as the "Aba Women's Riots of 1929" because that was how it was named in British records. The event appeared to be "crazy acts by hysterical women" to colonial administrators who were unfamiliar with the cultural practices being employed, and the events were recorded as riots. Scholars have argued that calling the event "Aba Riots" depoliticized the feminist dimension of the uprising and frames the events through a colonial lens. Since the event was called "Ogu Umunwanyi" in Igbo and "Ekong Iban" in Ibibio by the local women, both of which translate to "women's war", some historians have argued calling it the "Women's War" in order to center the perspective of the women involved rather than that of the colonial administration.The debate over naming has persisted, and the language of "riot" continues to appear particularly in British-originating sources.

== See also ==
1949 Enugu Colliery Massacre
