= Face-me-I-face-you =

Nigerian architectural style

Face-me-I-face-you or Face-to-face is a term for a specific type of residential real estate in Nigeria, where a group of one or two-room apartments have their entrances facing each other along a walkway, which leads to the main entrance of the apartment building.

"Face-me-I-face-you" apartment buildings are very common architectural style in major urban settlements in Nigeria; the flats are low rent and are commonly rented to the low income residents because of their affordability.

== Description ==
In this type of architecture, the toilet(s), bathroom(s) and kitchen space are usually shared among tenants in a yard (a term for a single block or row of apartments). The shared bathrooms and kitchens are referred to as "general bathroom/toilet". The Washington Post reported that a majority of Lagos residents live in face-me-I-face-you buildings.

Tenement buildings (also called face-me-I-face-you) have lasted for a very long time, arguably since the days when Africans moved away from building huts. The buildings were initially to occupy large families with many wives and children, and as time evolved, when those children grew up and sought greener pastures to other places, the rooms were vacant. In order to kill boredom, the Landlord (father of the house) decided to bring in other people who needed homes, in exchange for a token (rent) which is paid monthly.
