= 1949 Enugu Colliery Massacre =

Shooting of protesting coal miners in Nigeria

- Location: Enugu, Colony and Protectorate of Nigeria
- Date: 18 November 1949
- Deaths: 21
- Injuries: 51
- Victim: Striking miners
- Perpetrators: British police officers, led by F.S. Philip

The 1949 Enugu Colliery Massacre, also known as The Iva Valley Shooting, took place on 18 November 1949, when a British Superintendent of Police, F.S. Philip, commanding a number of British and Nigerian Police Officers ordered the shooting of unarmed protesting coal mine workers of the Iva Valley Coal Mine who were on strike.

The Iva Valley Coal Mine, located in the popular Igbo city of Enugu in Enugu state, was one of a number owned by the British-administered Enugu Colliery.

== Background ==
In 1938 Enugu became the administrative capital of the Eastern Region. The number of employed coal miners in Enugu grew from 6,000 (of mostly Udi men) in 1948 to 8,000 in 1958. Enugu's population rose sharply with its industrialisation; the population of the city reached 62,000 in 1952. Under colonial British rule, working conditions in Nigeria were harsh, characterized by regular physical punishment, forced acts of humiliation, and irregular payments of arrears owed to workers. In late 1949, local miners believed that large sums of arrears were owed to them, but were being withheld by the mines' management. These beliefs were fueled by local "Zikist", or nationalist, press. "Zikism" was a post World War II movement that was created out of admiration for Nnamdi Azikiwe who was a prominent nationalist of the National Council of Nigeria and the Cameroons. Labour tensions in Enugu came to a head on 18 November 1949, when British police massacred striking miners, killing 21 and wounding 51 others.

== Aftermath ==
The massacre that came to be known as "The Iva Valley Shooting" fueled Zikist sentiments among most Nigerians, and especially amongst Eastern Nigerians. Multiple Zikist groups used the shooting to fuel their calls for independence, and to push the British imperial administration out of Nigeria. This resulted in the formation of the National Emergency Committee (NEC), a political committee formed by labour unions that were pro-Zikist and pro-National Council of Nigeria and the Cameroons. The NEC proliferated knowledge of the Enugu massacre throughout Nigeria, helped organise secret meetings to promote anticolonial sentiment, and helped organise anticolonial demonstrations and riots.
