= Nkanu West =

Local Government Area in Enugu State, Nigeria

- LGA
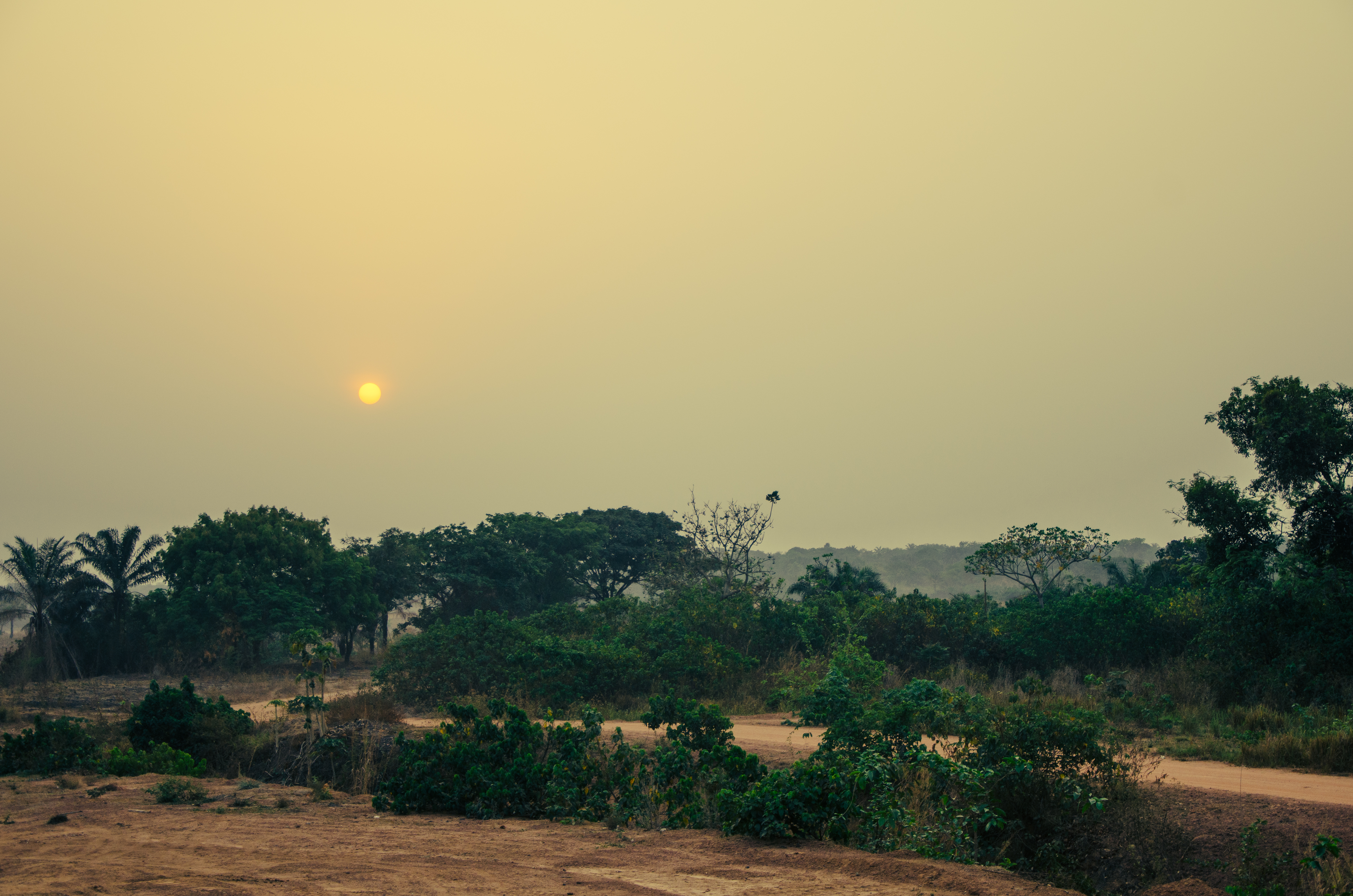
- Nkanu West
- Interactive map of Nkanu West
- Location in Nigeria
- Coordinates: 6°18′N 7°33′E
- Country: Nigeria
- State: Enugu State
- Headquarter: Agbani

Government
  - Local Government Chairman: Uchenna Callistus Ejim (PDP)

Area
  - Total: 225 km^{2} (87 sq mi)

Population (2006 census)
  - Total: 3,460,695
  - Density: 15,400/km^{2} (39,800/sq mi)
- Time zone: UTC+1 (WAT)
- 3-digit postal code prefix: 402
- ISO 3166 code: NG.EN.NW

Nkanu West is a Local Government Area of Enugu State, Nigeria. Its headquarters is situated in the town of Agbani.

Nkanu West Local Government Area is made up of Agbani, Akpugo, Akegbe Ugwu, Obuoffia, Umueze, Obe, Amodu, Ozalla and Amurri. Nkanu people are predominantly farmers and butchers. It has an area of 225 km^{2} and a population of 146,695 at the 2006 census.

The postal code of the area is 402.

== Economy/Geography ==
Numerous hotels, banks, businesses, and both publicly and privately held organisations are located in Nkanu West local government area's. Additionally, the Local Government Area''s is well-liked for growing a variety of crops, including oil palm, cassava, yam, and cocoyam. The Local Government Area is a hub for trade, with multiple marketplaces where a wide range of goods are bought and sold.

The average temperature in Nkanu West Local Government Area, which spans 255 square kilometres (87 square miles), is 27 degrees Celsius or 80 degrees Fahrenheit. The two main seasons in Nkanu West Local Government Area''s are the dry and the rainy seasons, with an average wind speed of 10 km/h (9.1 ft/s; 6.2 mph) in the region. Another important geographical feature in the region is the Ani Ozalla lake.
