= Iva Valley =

Locality in Enugu, Nigeria

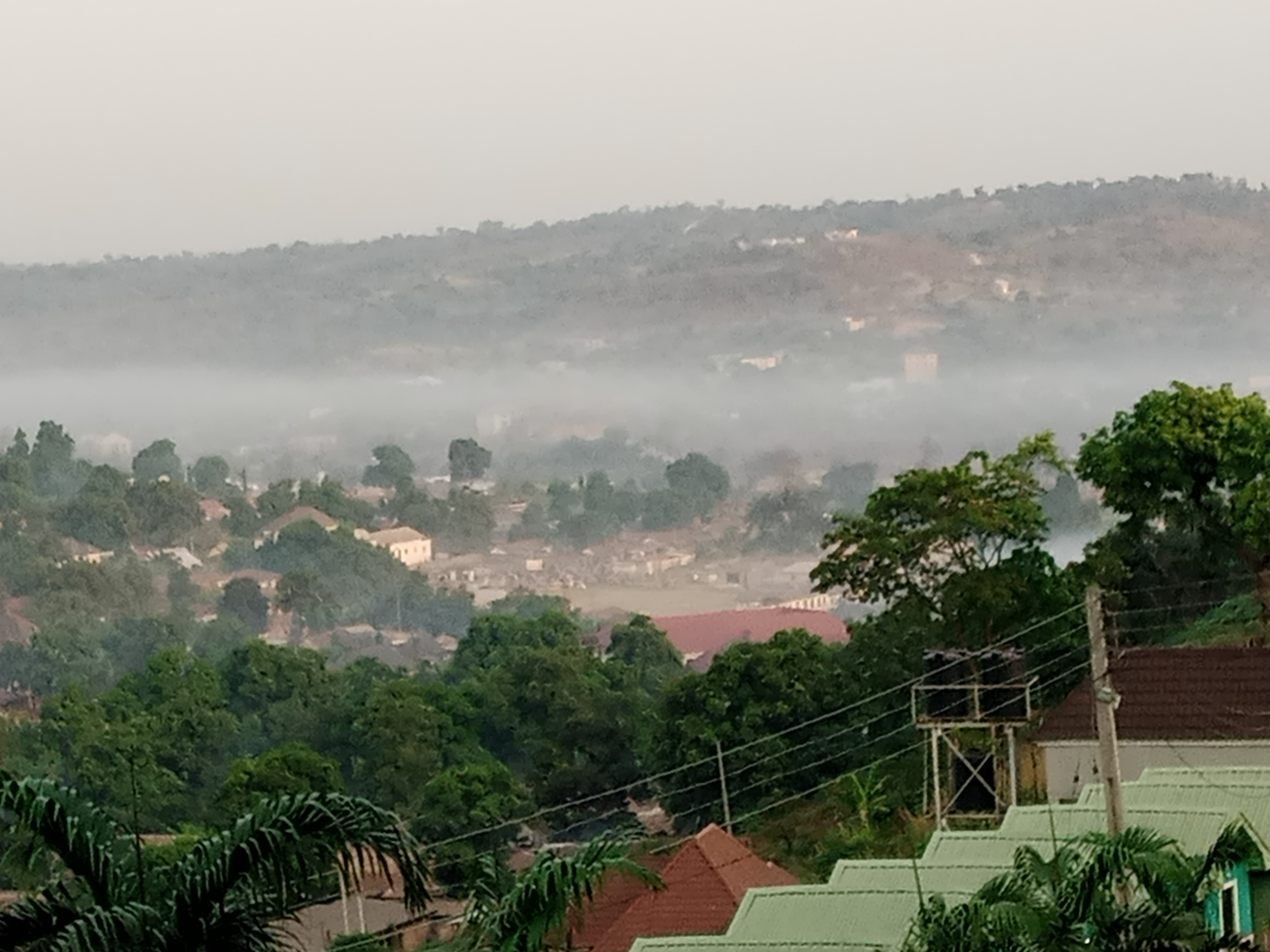

Iva Valley is a locality located in the Nigerian Ngwo township in Enugu city.

The Iva Valley is named after a valley in the area which bears the same name. The locality is the site of the Iva Valley Coal Mine. The mine was opened in 1917 by the British colonial government of Nigeria after the Udi Mine in 1915, making it the second ever coal mine established in the city.

The Iva Valley is famed in Enugu for the events of 18 November 1949 when 21 miners were shot dead by policemen while striking. A detailed account of the incident was also published in the memoirs of a British resident of Enugu at the time, James Stewart Smith.
