= History of Nigeria =

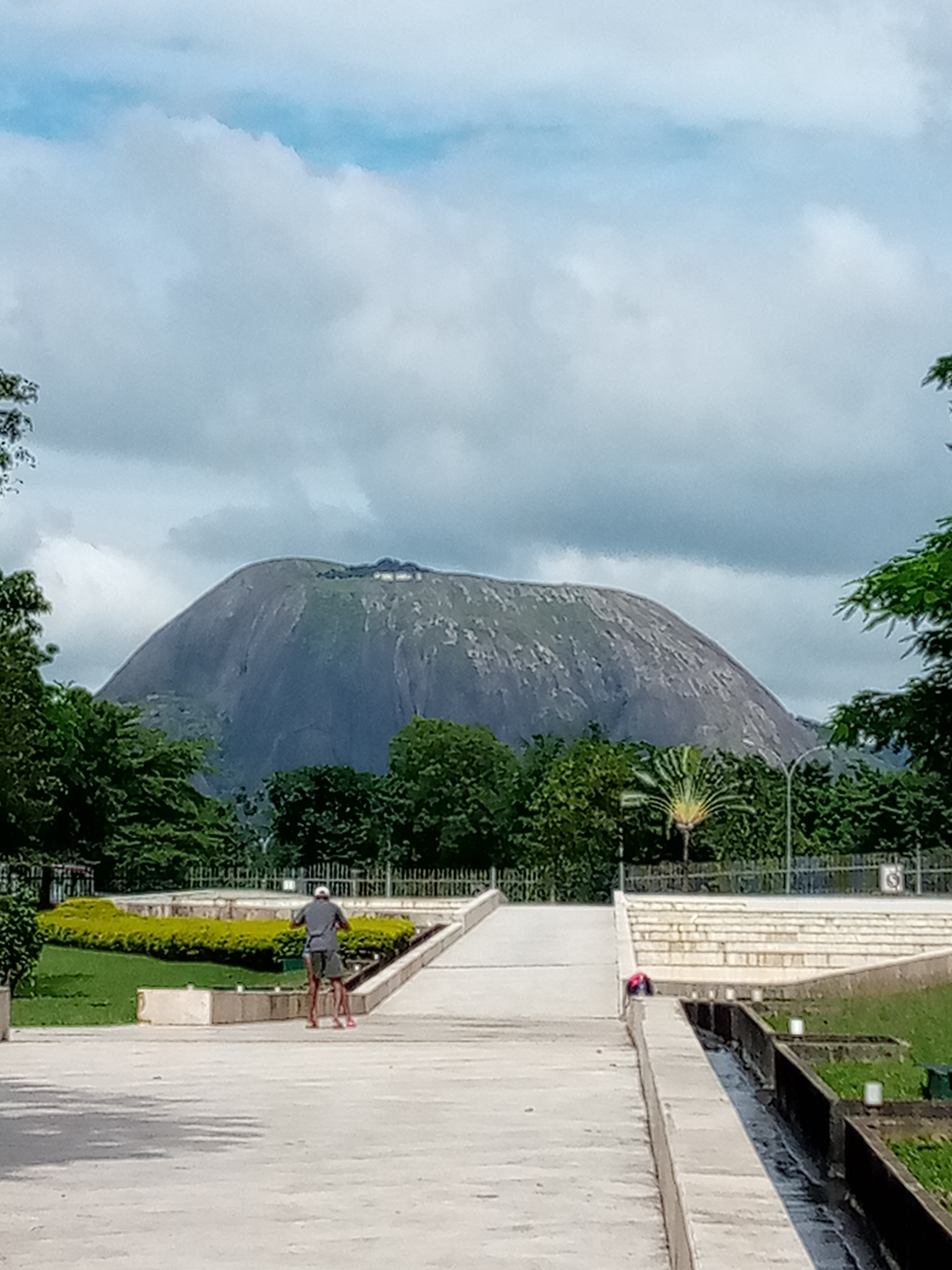
Aso Rock, close to the presidential villa

The history of Nigeria can be traced to the earliest inhabitants from at least 9000 BC through to early civilizations such as the Nok culture which began around 1500 BC. Numerous ancient African civilizations settled in the region that is known today as Nigeria, such as the Ife Empire, Kingdom of Nri, the Benin Kingdom, and the Oyo Empire. Islam reached Nigeria through the Bornu Empire between (1068 AD) and Hausa Kingdom during the 11th century, while Christianity came to Nigeria in the 15th century through Augustinian and Capuchin monks from Portugal to the Kingdom of Warri. The Songhai Empire also occupied part of the region. Through contact with Europeans, early harbour towns such as Calabar, Badagry, and Bonny emerged along the coast after 1480, which did business in the transatlantic slave trade, among other things.

After 1804, Usman dan Fodio unified an immense territory in his jihad against the superior but quarrelling Hausa states of the north, which was stabilised by his successors as the "Caliphate of Sokoto".

In its initial endeavour to stop the slave trade in West Africa, the United Kingdom gradually expanded its sphere of influence after 1851, starting from the tiny island of Lagos (3 km^{2}) and the port city of Calabar. The British followed expansive trading companies such as the RNC and missionaries such as Mary Slessor, who advanced into the hinterland, preached and founded missionary schools, but also took action against local customs such as the religiously induced killing of twins or servants of deceased village elders and against the Trial by ordeal as a means of establishing the legal truth. At the Berlin Congo Conference in 1885, the European powers demarcated their spheres of interest in Africa without regard to ethnic or linguistic boundaries and without giving those affected a say. Thereafter, the British made increasing advances in the Niger region, which they had negotiated in Berlin, and ultimately defeated the Sokoto Caliphate. From 1903, Great Britain controlled almost the entire present-day territory of Nigeria, which was united under a single administration in 1914 (in 1919, a border strip of the former German colony of Cameroon was added to the territory of Nigeria).

Under the British colonial administration, purchasing cartels (of companies such as Unilever, Nestlé and Cadbury) kept the prices of cocoa, palm oil and peanuts artificially low, thereby damaging Nigerian agriculture, but on the other hand ports and an extensive railway network were also built. Newspapers, political parties, trade unions and higher education institutions were established - rather against the wishes of the colonial rulers in order to control the oversized colony. In the East African campaign of 1941, Nigerian regiments achieved the first major success against the Axis powers with the fastest military advance in history at the time. In 1956, oil fields were discovered in Nigeria. Since then, vandalism, oil theft and illegal, unprofessional refining by local residents have caused the contamination of the Niger Delta with crude and heavy oil, particularly around disused exploratory boreholes.

Nigeria gained independence in 1960. From 1967 to 1970, the Biafran War raged in the southeast, becoming one of the worst humanitarian disasters of the late twentieth century. After nearly three decades of largely restrictive military rule, Nigeria transitioned to a democratic federal republic in 1999, modeled in part on the political system of the United States.

Quadrennial elections have been criticized as lacking transparency. Nevertheless, transfers of presidential power at Aso Rock occurred peacefully in 2007, 2010, 2015, and 2023, making Nigeria one of the relatively stable democracies in the region despite persistent institutional challenges.

The Boko Haram insurgency gained significant international attention around 2014 but later weakened due to internal divisions and coordinated regional military efforts. In the same year, the spread of the Ebola epidemic to the densely populated city of Lagos was successfully contained through rapid public health response and crisis management.

In recent years, Nigeria has experienced growing international recognition for its cultural and technological sectors, including the global rise of Nigerian music and the expansion of the film industry. The country has also seen growth in the technology sector, producing five of Africa's seven technology unicorn companies.

Since January 2024, Nigeria has sought to expand domestic refining capacity, including the commissioning of large new refineries, in an effort to process more of its own crude oil rather than relying heavily on imported refined products.

Kidnapping for ransom remains one of Nigeria's most significant security challenges. Surveys indicate that approximately 38% of Nigerians personally know someone who has been kidnapped.

Economic reforms implemented in 2023 were followed by a sharp rise in the cost of living; polls suggest that about 64% of Nigerians report being unable to afford basic needs or experiencing food insecurity. The same survey reported that 78% of respondents rated the performance of President Bola Tinubu as “poor” or “very poor”.

== Prehistory ==
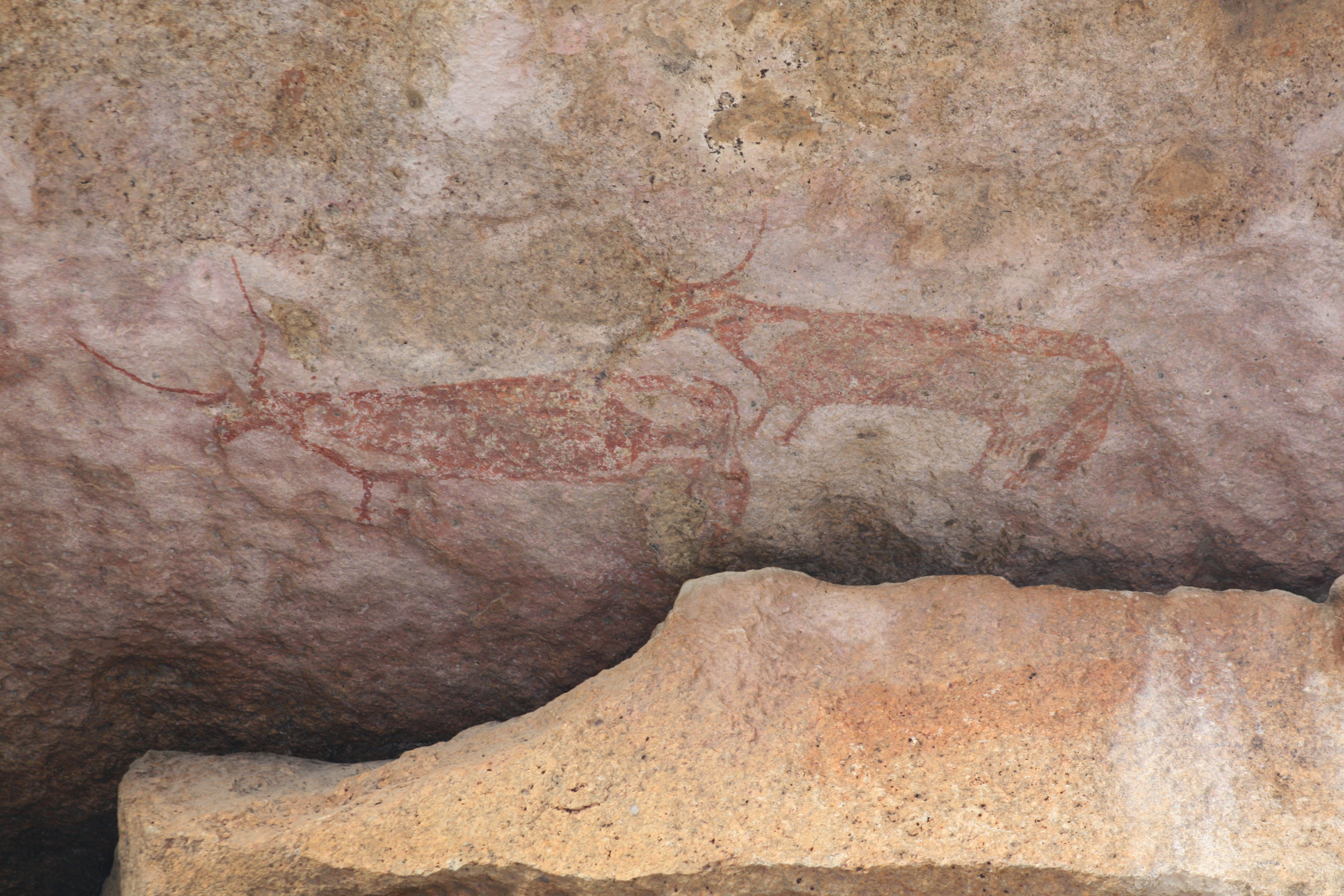
Rock art found in Birnin Kudu, Jigawa State

Acheulean tool-using archaic humans may have dwelled throughout West Africa since at least between 780,000 BP and 126,000 BP (Middle Pleistocene).

By at least 61,000 BP, Middle Stone Age West Africans may have begun to migrate south of the West Sudanian savanna, and, by at least 25,000 BP, may have begun to dwell near the coast of West Africa.

An excessively dry Ogolian period occurred, spanning from 20,000 BP to 12,000 BP. By 15,000 BP, the number of settlements made by Middle Stone Age West Africans decreased as there was an increase in humid conditions, expansion of the West African forest, and increase in the number of settlements made by Late Stone Age West African hunter-gatherers. Iwo Eleru people persisted at Iwo Eleru, in Nigeria, as late as 13,000 BP.

Macrolith-using late Middle Stone Age peoples, who dwelled in Central Africa, to western Central Africa, to West Africa, were displaced by microlith-using Late Stone Age Africans as they migrated from Central Africa into West Africa. After having persisted as late as 1000 BP, or some period of time after 1500 AD, remaining West African hunter-gatherers were ultimately acculturated and admixed into the larger groups of West African agriculturalists.

The Dufuna canoe, a dugout canoe found in Yobe State in northeastern Nigeria has been dated to around 6300 BC, making it the oldest known boat in Africa, and the second oldest worldwide.

== Iron Age ==
Archaeological sites containing iron smelting furnaces and slag have been excavated at sites in the Nsukka region of southeast Nigeria in what is now Igboland: dating to 2000 BC at the site of Lejja (Eze-Uzomaka 2009) and to 750 BC and at the site of Opi (Holl 2009). Iron metallurgy may have been independently developed in the Nok culture between the 9th century BC and 550 BC. More recently, Bandama and Babalola (2023) have indicated that iron metallurgical development occurred 2631 BC – 2458 BC at Lejja, in Nigeria.

Daima, an archaeological tell site located near Lake Chad in Borno State, has a history of human occupation spanning approximately 1800 years, from 550 BC to 1150 AD. The sequence of occupation is divided into three phases: Daima I (800 BC—500 AD) represents an occupation of a people without metalwork; Daima II (500 BC—800 AD) represents the earliest iron-using people of the site; and Daima III (800 BC—1100/1300 AD) a more "advanced" iron-using people.

=== Nok culture ===
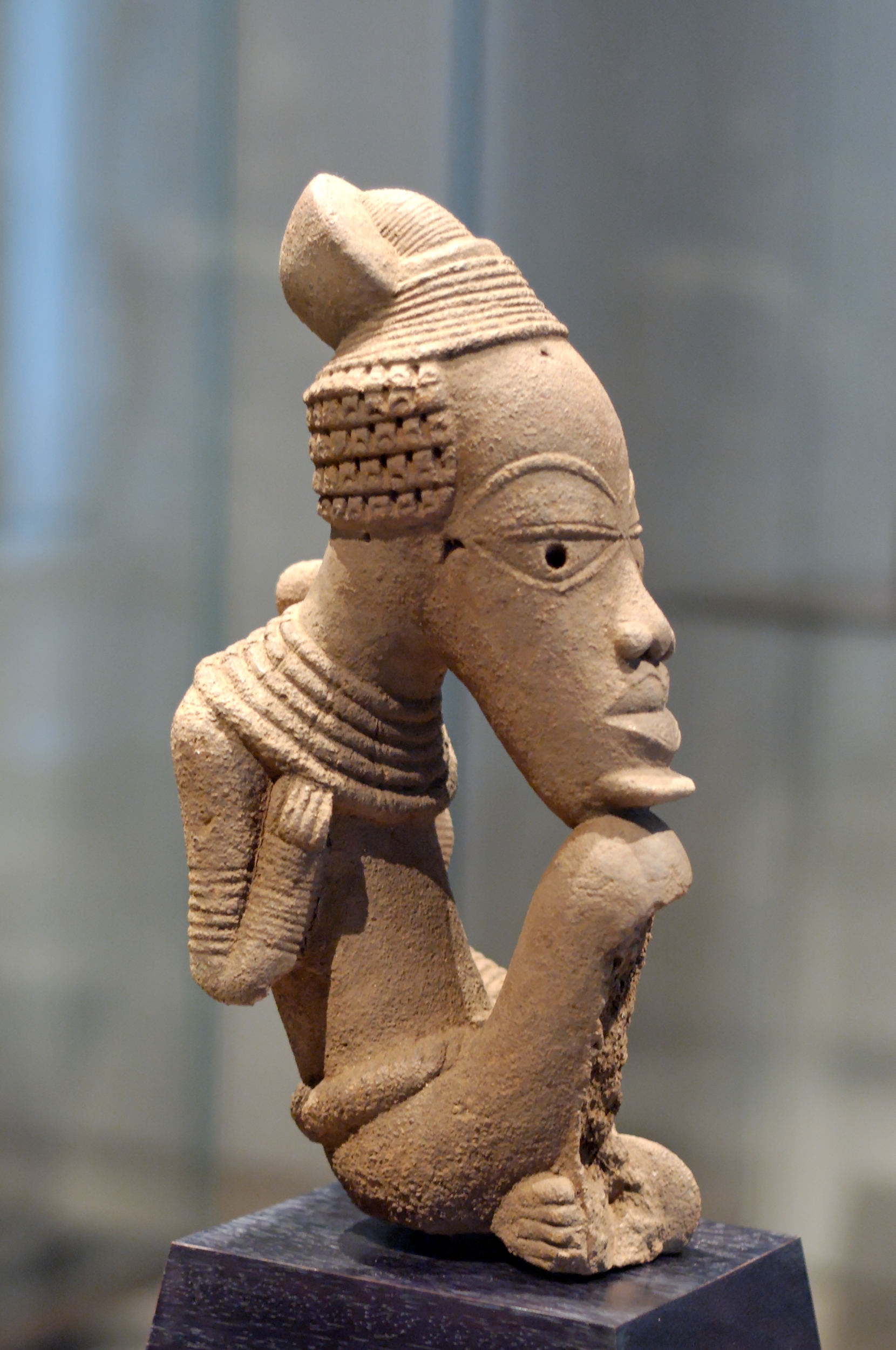
Nok sculpture, terracotta

Nok culture may have emerged in 1500 BC and continued to persist until 1 BC. Nok people developed terracotta sculptures through large-scale economic production, as part of a complex funerary culture. Iron metallurgy may have been independently developed in the Nok culture between the 9th century BC and 550 BC. As each share cultural and artistic similarity with the Nok culture, the Niger-Congo-speaking Yoruba, Jukun, or Dakakari peoples may be descendants of the Nok peoples. Based on stylistic similarities with the Nok terracottas, the bronze figurines of the Yoruba Ife Empire and the Bini kingdom of Benin may also be continuations of the traditions of the earlier Nok culture.

=== Igbo-Ukwu ===
Archaeology at the site of Igbo-Ukwu has revealed an advanced level of expertise in the area of bronze sculpture. Smiths from around the 9th century used techniques such as lost wax casting that were not found elsewhere in the region at the time. Their works are thought to be the earliest examples of copper alloy in sub-Saharan Africa. Beads used in the art are believed to have come from as far as Egypt, suggesting a strong presence of cross-Africa trade.

== Early states before 1500 ==
=== Advance of Islam in the north, the 14 Hausa states ===
With the spread of Islam from the 7th century AD, the area became known as Sudan or Bilad Al Sudan (“Land of the Blacks”, Arabic: بلاد السودان). Around the eighth century, Arab documents mention that Muslims crossed the Sahara to West Africa for trade purposes. Several factors contributed to the growth of the Muslim class in non-Muslim kingdoms. Islam facilitated long-distance trade by providing merchants with useful tools such as contract law, credit (e.g. mudaraba) and information networks. Muslim merchants also played an important role as advisors and scribes. They had the ability to use letter-based writing (instead of hieroglyphics), which was helpful in the administration of kingdoms. Arithmetic in a decimal system (Arabic numerals) was also introduced to West Africa through Islam.

A system of Hausa city-states had existed in northern Nigeria since the 11th century. These city-states were mainly subject to tribute to large empires such as Kanem on Lake Chad. In the 14th century, all the ruling elites of Hausaland were Muslims.

From 1400 onwards, Nigeria's first written documents with letters were produced in the north of the country. They were part of the Islamic missionary work and were written in Ajami - a script based on Arabic, but supplemented by special letters for local languages (Hausa, Fula, Yoruba). The Hausa also began to write history. In the Kano Chronicle, the history of the Hausa state is traced back to 999 AD.

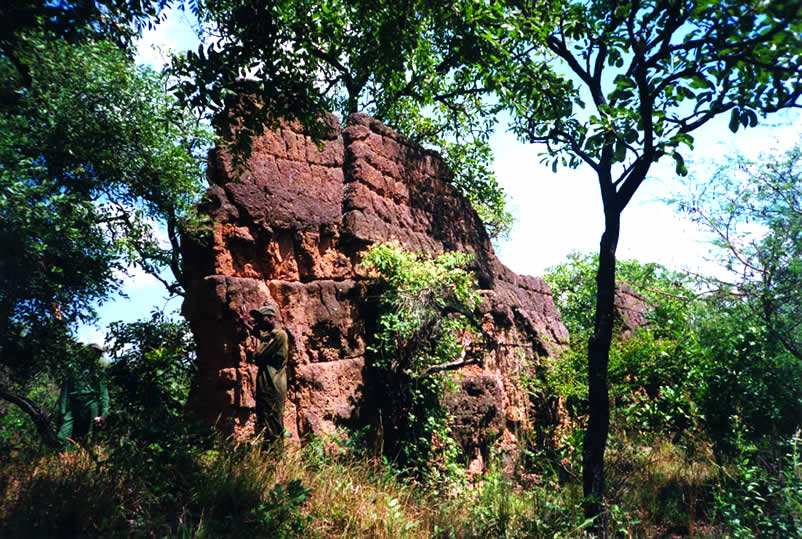
Sungbo's Eredo, one of Sub-Saharan Africa's largest single ancient monument found, situated in Ogun State. It's a 100 mile long wall believed to have been constructed a millennium ago.

=== Northern kingdoms of the Sahel ===
After the collapse of Mali, a local leader named Sonni Ali (1464–1492) founded the Songhai Empire in the Middle Niger region and took control of the trans-Saharan trade. Sonni Ali conquered Timbuktu in 1468 and Djenné in 1473 and built his regime on trade revenues and cooperation with Muslim merchants. His successor Askia Muhammad Ture (1493–1528) made Islam the official religion, built mosques and brought Muslim scholars to Gao, including al-Maghili (d. 1504).

Throughout the 16th century, much of northern Nigeria paid homage to the Songhai Empire in the west or the rival Borno Empire in the east.

=== Kanem–Bornu Empire ===
Map of Kanem-Bornu at its largest extent.

Kanem became an empire in the Lake Chad Basin in the 13th century. The Mai (king) of Kanem and his court adopted Islam in the 11th century. The first ruler of Kanem was Saif and his dynasty, the Sayfawa, ruled the empire for a millennium (800 AD to 1846 AD). The first Muslim ruler of Kanem was Mai Umme Jilmi (r. 1085–1097), who died on his way to Mecca in Egypt. Due to the growing influence of Kanem in North Africa and the territorial expansion it achieved in the 12th and 13th centuries, the empire became very well known in the Islamic world of the time.

The civil war that shattered Kanem in the second half of the 14th century led to the independence of Bornu. The Sayfawa moved to Bornu. Mai Ali Ghaji (r. 1470–1508) established a large capital there called Birnin N'gazargamu. He carried out government reforms and ended the civil unrest. With a reinvigorated army, he extended Bornu's influence to the neighboring regions and demanded tribute from some Hausa states. He also re-established diplomatic and trade relations with North Africa. Ali's successors continued to rule Kanem and kept it as a province of Bornu until the 19th century.

The most prosperous period in the history of the empire was the reign of Idris Alauma (1571–1603). His troops carried out far-reaching campaigns: in the north from southern Libya to northern Niger; in the east from eastern Chad to northern Cameroon; in the south he put down the rebellion of a Marghi prince and in the west he subdued Kano. He also carried out administrative reforms. He replaced customary law with Shari'a law and appointed qadis (judges). He built several mosques, which were constructed from baked bricks instead of reeds. He also undertook the pilgrimage to Mecca and financed the construction of a hostel for the Bornu pilgrims there.

Borno's economy was dominated by the Trans-Sudanese slave trade and the desert trade in salt and livestock. The court and mosques of Borno retained a reputation as centers of Islamic culture and scholarship.

=== Development and formation of Ife ===
Archaeological evidence points to settlements in Ile-Ife dating back as early as the 10th to 6th century BCE. The city gradually transitioned into a more urban center around the 4th to 7th centuries CE. By the 8th century, a powerful city-state had formed, laying the foundation for the eventual rise of the Ife Empire (circa 1200–1420). Under figures like the Now defied figures such as Oduduwa, revered as the first divine king of the Yoruba, the Ife Empire grew. Ile-Ife, its capital, rose to prominence, its influence extending across a vast area of what is now southwestern Nigeria.

The period between 1200 and 1400 is often referred to as the "golden age" of Ile-Ife, marked by exceptional artistic production, economic prosperity, and urban development. The Ife Empire's strategic location facilitated its participation in extensive trade networks that spanned West Africa. Of note is the evidence of a thriving glass bead industry in Ile-Ife. Archaeological excavations have unearthed numerous glass beads, indicating local production and pointing to the existence of specialized knowledge and technology. These beads, particularly the dichroic beads known for their iridescent qualities, were highly sought-after trade items, found as far afield as the Sahel region, demonstrating the far-reaching commercial connections of the Ife Empire.

The wealth generated through trade fueled the remarkable urban development witnessed in Ile-Ife. Archaeological evidence points to a well-planned city with impressive infrastructure, including paved roads and sophisticated drainage systems, a distinctive feature of Ife urban planning was the use of potsherd pavements. These pavements, created using fragments of broken pottery. The Ife Empire declined around the 15th century.

=== Oyo and Benin ===
During the 15th century, Oyo and Benin surpassed Ife as political and economic powers, although Ife preserved its status as a religious center. Respect for the priestly functions of the ooni of Ife was a crucial factor in the evolution of Yoruba culture. The Ife model of government was adapted at Oyo, where a member of its ruling dynasty controlled several smaller city-states. A state council (the Oyo Mesi) named the Alaafin (king) and acted as a check on his authority. Their capital city was situated about 100 km north of present-day Oyo. Unlike the forest-bound Yoruba kingdoms, Oyo was in the savanna and drew its military strength from its cavalry forces, which established hegemony over the adjacent Nupe and the Borgu kingdoms and thereby developed trade routes farther to the north.

The Benin Empire (1440–1897; called Bini by locals) was a pre-colonial African state in what is now modern Nigeria. It should not be confused with the modern-day country called Benin, formerly called Dahomey.

=== Igala Kingdom ===
The Igala are an ethnic group of Nigeria. Their homeland, the former Igala Kingdom, is an approximately triangular area of about 14,000 km^{2} (5,400 sq mi) in the angle formed by the Benue and Niger rivers. The area was formerly the Igala Division of Kabba province and is now part of Kogi State. The capital is Idah in Kogi state. Igala people are majorly found in Kogi state. They can be found in Idah, Igalamela/Odolu, Ajaka, Ofu, Olamaboro, Dekina, Bassa, Ankpa, omala, Lokoja, Ibaji, Ajaokuta, Lokoja and kotonkarfe Local government all in Kogi state. Other states where Igalas can be found are Anambra, Delta and Benue states.

=== Yoruba ===
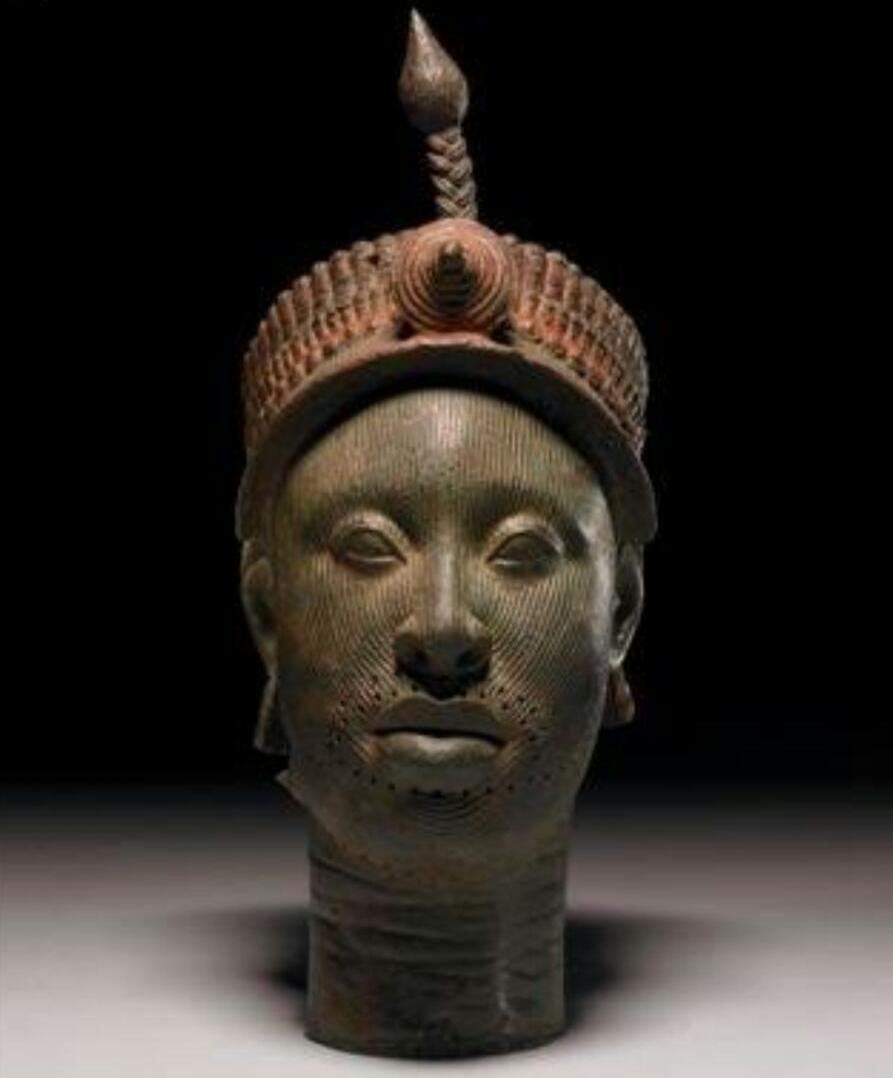
Ife bronze casting of Oduduwa, dated c. 14th-15th century, in the British Museum.

Historically, the Yoruba people have been the dominant group on the west bank of the Niger. Their nearest linguistic relatives are the Igala who live on the opposite side of the Niger's divergence from the Benue, and from whom they are believed to have split about 2,000 years ago. The Yoruba were organized in mostly patrilineal groups that occupied village communities and subsisted on agriculture. From approximately the 8th century, adjacent village compounds called ilé coalesced into numerous territorial city-states in which clan loyalties became subordinate to dynastic chieftains. Urbanisation was accompanied by high levels of artistic achievement, particularly in terracotta and ivory sculpture and in the sophisticated metal casting produced at Ife.

The Yoruba are especially known for the Oyo Empire that dominated the region. The Oyo Empire held supremacy over other Yoruba nations like the Egba Kingdom, Awori Kingdom, and the Egbado. In its prime, they also dominated the Kingdom of Dahomey (now located in the modern day Republic of Benin).

The Yoruba pay tribute to a pantheon composed of a Supreme Deity, Olorun and the Orisha. The Olorun is now called God in the Yoruba language. There are 400 deities called Orisha who perform various tasks. According to the Yoruba, Oduduwa is regarded as the ancestor of the Yoruba kings. According to one of the various myths about him, he founded Ife and dispatched his sons and daughters to establish similar kingdoms in other parts of what is today known as Yorubaland. The Yorubaland now consists of different tribes from different states which are located in the Southwestern part of the country, states like Lagos State, Oyo State, Ondo State, Osun State, Ekiti State and Ogun State, among others.

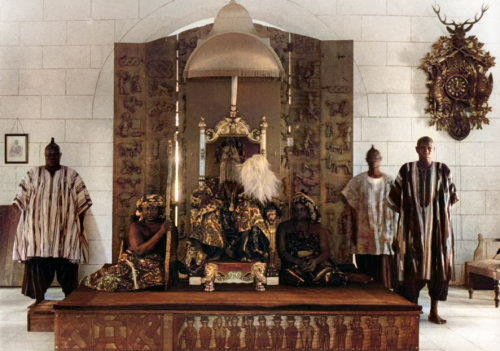
Reconstructed palace of Alaafin of Oyo circa mid-1900s (colorized)

=== Kingdom of Bonny ===
The Kingdom of Bonny (also known as Grand Bonny or Ibani), an Ijaw state, is traditionally dated to before or about 1000 AD. According to Ibani tradition, its founders migrated from the central Niger Delta (particularly the Kolokuma area) and first settled at Orupiri before relocating to Okoloama (the island later known as Bonny). The early rulers remembered in tradition include Ndoli (Okpara Ndoli), Opuamakuba, Alagbariya, and Asimini. The kingdom later became an important coastal trading centre, but its foundation is placed well before European contact.

=== Kingdom of Warri ===
The Kingdom of Warri (also known as the Kingdom of Iwere), associated with the Itsekiri, is traditionally dated to c. 1480. According to Itsekiri and Benin traditions, it was founded by Prince Ginuwa, the eldest son of Oba Olua of the Kingdom of Benin. Ginuwa left Benin with a retinue and established the Olu dynasty among existing Itsekiri communities in the western Niger Delta. The first capital was at Ijala; under his successor the capital was moved to Ode-Itsekiri.

Because of its coastal position on the Forcados and related waterways, the new kingdom quickly entered into contact with Portuguese traders who had reached the Benin coast and the western Niger Delta in the late 15th century. Around 1500 the Portuguese explorer Duarte Pacheco Pereira recorded a place of barter in the area (referred to as Huela), describing trade in cotton cloths, panther skins, palm oil and blue shells exchanged for brass and copper bracelets. These early commercial exchanges marked the beginning of Warri’s long involvement in Atlantic trade.

=== Igbo Kingdoms ===
==== Nri Kingdom ====
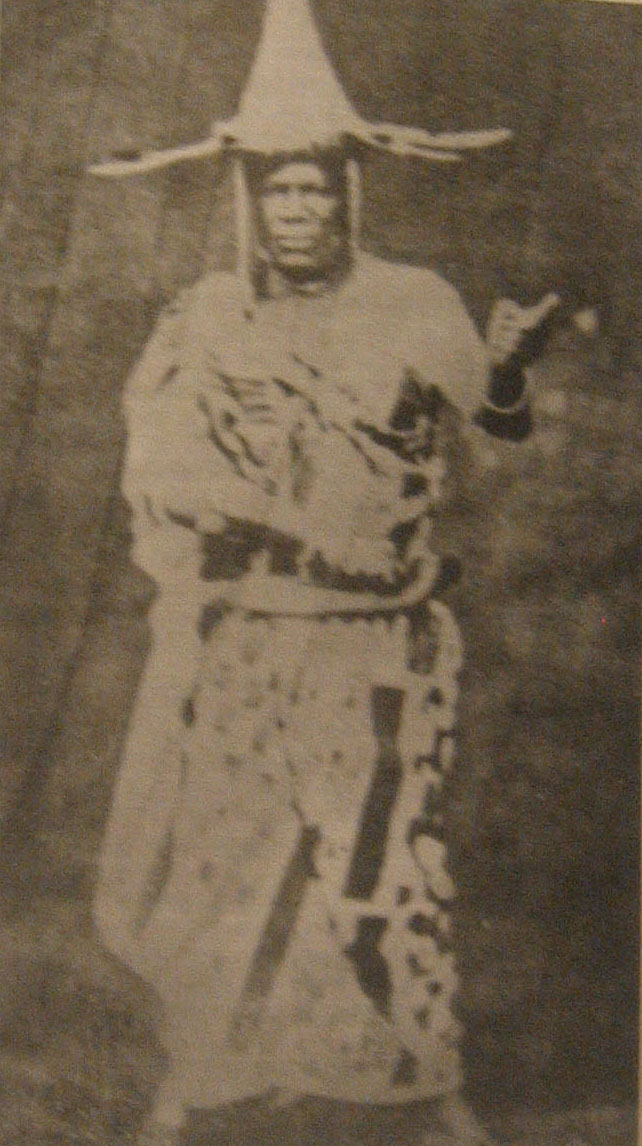
King Jaja of Opobo.

The Kingdom of Nri is considered to be the foundation of Igbo culture and the oldest Kingdom in Nigeria. Nri and Aguleri, where the Igbo creation myth originates, are in the territory of the Umueri clan, who trace their lineages back to the patriarchal king-figure, Eri. Eri's origins are unclear, though he has been described as a "sky being" sent by Chukwu (God). He has been characterized as having first given societal order to the people of Anambra.

Archaeological evidence suggests that Nri hegemony in Igboland may go back as far as the 9th century, and royal burials have been unearthed dating to at least the 10th century. Eri, the god-like founder of Nri, is believed to have settled in the region around 948 with other related Igbo cultures following in the 13th century. The first Eze Nri (King of Nri), Ìfikuánim, followed directly after him. According to Igbo oral tradition, his reign started in 1043. At least one historian puts Ìfikuánim's reign much later, around 1225.

Each king traces his origin back to the founding ancestor, Eri. Each king is a ritual reproduction of Eri. The initiation rite of a new king shows that the ritual process of becoming Ezenri (Nri priest-king) follows closely the path traced by the hero in establishing the Nri kingdom.

— E. Elochukwu Uzukwu

Nri and Aguleri and part of the Umueri clan, a cluster of Igbo village groups which traces its origins to a sky being called Eri and significantly, includes (from the viewpoint of its Igbo members) the neighbouring kingdom of Igala.

— Elizabeth Allo Isichei

The Kingdom of Nri was a religio-polity, a sort of theocratic state, that developed in the central heartland of the Igbo region. The Nri had a taboo symbolic code with six types. These included human (such as the birth of twins), animal (such as killing or eating of pythons), object, temporal, behavioral, speech and place taboos. The rules regarding these taboos were used to educate and govern Nri's subjects. This meant that, while certain Igbo may have lived under different formal administrations, all followers of the Igbo religion had to abide by the rules of the faith and obey its representative on earth, the Eze Nri.

With the decline of Nri kingdom in the 15th to 17th centuries, several states once under their influence, became powerful economic oracular oligarchies and large commercial states that dominated Igboland. The neighboring Awka city-state rose in power as a result of their powerful Agbala oracle and metalworking expertise. The Onitsha Kingdom, which was originally inhabited by Igbos from east of the Niger, was founded in the 16th century by migrants from Anioma (Western Igboland). Later groups like the Igala traders from the hinterland settled in Onitsha in the 18th century. Kingdoms west of the River Niger like Aboh (Abo), which was significantly populated by Igbos among other tribes, dominated trade along the lower River Niger area from the 17th century until European explorations into the Niger delta. The Umunoha state in the Owerri area used the Igwe ka Ala oracle at their advantage. However, the Cross River Igbo state like the Aro had the greatest influence in Igboland and adjacent areas after the decline of Nri.

The Arochukwu kingdom emerged after the Aro-Ibibio Wars from 1630 to 1720, and went on to form the Aro Confederacy which economically dominated Eastern Nigerian hinterland. The source of the Aro Confederacy's economic dominance was based on the judicial oracle of Ibini Ukpabi ("Long Juju") and their military forces which included powerful allies such as Ohafia, Abam, Ezza, and other related neighboring states. The Abiriba and Aro are Brothers whose migration is traced to the Ekpa Kingdom, East of Cross River, their exact take of location was at Ekpa (Mkpa) east of the Cross River. They crossed the river to Urupkam (Usukpam) west of the Cross River and founded two settlements: Ena Uda and Ena Ofia in present-day Erai. Aro and Abiriba cooperated to become a powerful economic force.

The Igbo-Igala Wars were a series of conflicts between the Igbo people and the Igala people in pre-colonial Nigeria. The wars occurred in the 18th and 19th centuries and were primarily driven by territorial disputes, competition for resources, and political power struggles between the two ethnic groups. The Igbo and Igala engaged in military confrontations, with both sides vying for control over strategic territories. These wars were part of the complex dynamics and inter-ethnic relations that characterized the region during that historical period. The outcomes of specific battles and the overall impact of the Igbo-Igala Wars varied, and the conflicts eventually contributed to shaping the socio-political landscape of the region.

Igbo gods were numerous, but their relationship to one another and human beings was essentially egalitarian, reflecting Igbo society as a whole. A number of oracles and local cults attracted devotees while the central deity, the earth mother and fertility figure Ala, was venerated at shrines throughout Igboland.

The Kingdom of Benin had influence on the western Igbo, who adopted many of the political structures familiar to the Yoruba-Benin region, but Asaba and its immediate neighbours, such as Ibusa, Ogwashi-Ukwu, Okpanam, Issele-Azagba and Issele-Ukwu, were much closer to the Kingdom of Nri. Ofega was the queen for the Onitsha Igbo.

==== Akwa Akpa ====
The modern city of Calabar was founded in 1786 by Efik families who had left Creek Town, farther up the Calabar river, settling on the east bank in a position where they were able to dominate traffic with European vessels that anchored in the river, and soon becoming the most powerful in the region extending from now Calabar down to Bakassi in the East and Oron Nation in the West. Akwa Akpa (named Calabar by the Spanish) became a center of the Atlantic slave trade, where African slaves were sold in exchange for European manufactured goods. Igbo people formed the majority of enslaved Africans sold as slaves from Calabar, despite forming a minority among the ethnic groups in the region. From 1725 until 1750, roughly 17,000 enslaved Africans were sold from Calabar to European slave traders; from 1772 to 1775, the number soared to over 62,000.

With the suppression of the slave trade, palm oil and palm kernels became the main exports. The chiefs of Akwa Akpa placed themselves under British protection in 1884. From 1884 until 1906 Old Calabar was the headquarters of the Niger Coast Protectorate, after which Lagos became the main center. Now called Calabar, the city remained an important port shipping ivory, timber, beeswax, and palm produce until 1916, when the railway terminus was opened at Port Harcourt, 145 km to the west.

=== Efik Ibibio Kingdom ===
The Efik Ibibio Kingdom was one of the major Kingdoms in present day Nigeria. Often referred to as the Calabar Kingdom led by the Obong of Calabar, it was this Kingdom that the British Government negotiated with that resulted in a treaty for the formation of Southern Protectorate of Nigeria with the Obong of Calabar given the name, The Treaty King. This Kingdom became one of the most powerful Kingdoms that formed the present day Nigeria with HRH Richard Henshaw, Obong of Calabar, being one of the six Nigerian signatories in the January 1, 1914 amalgamation agreement.

== First contact with colonial powers, Nigeria as a "slave coast" ==
=== Trade in ivory, gold and slaves ===
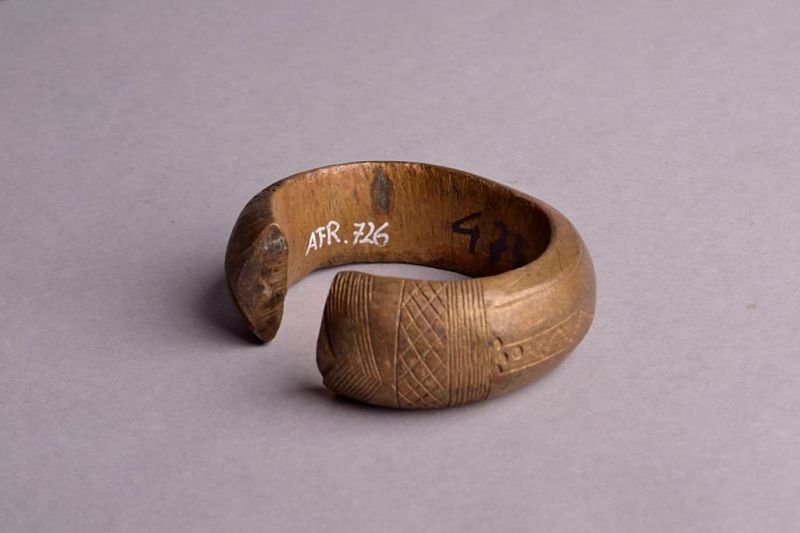
Bronze manilla, the currency of many centuries

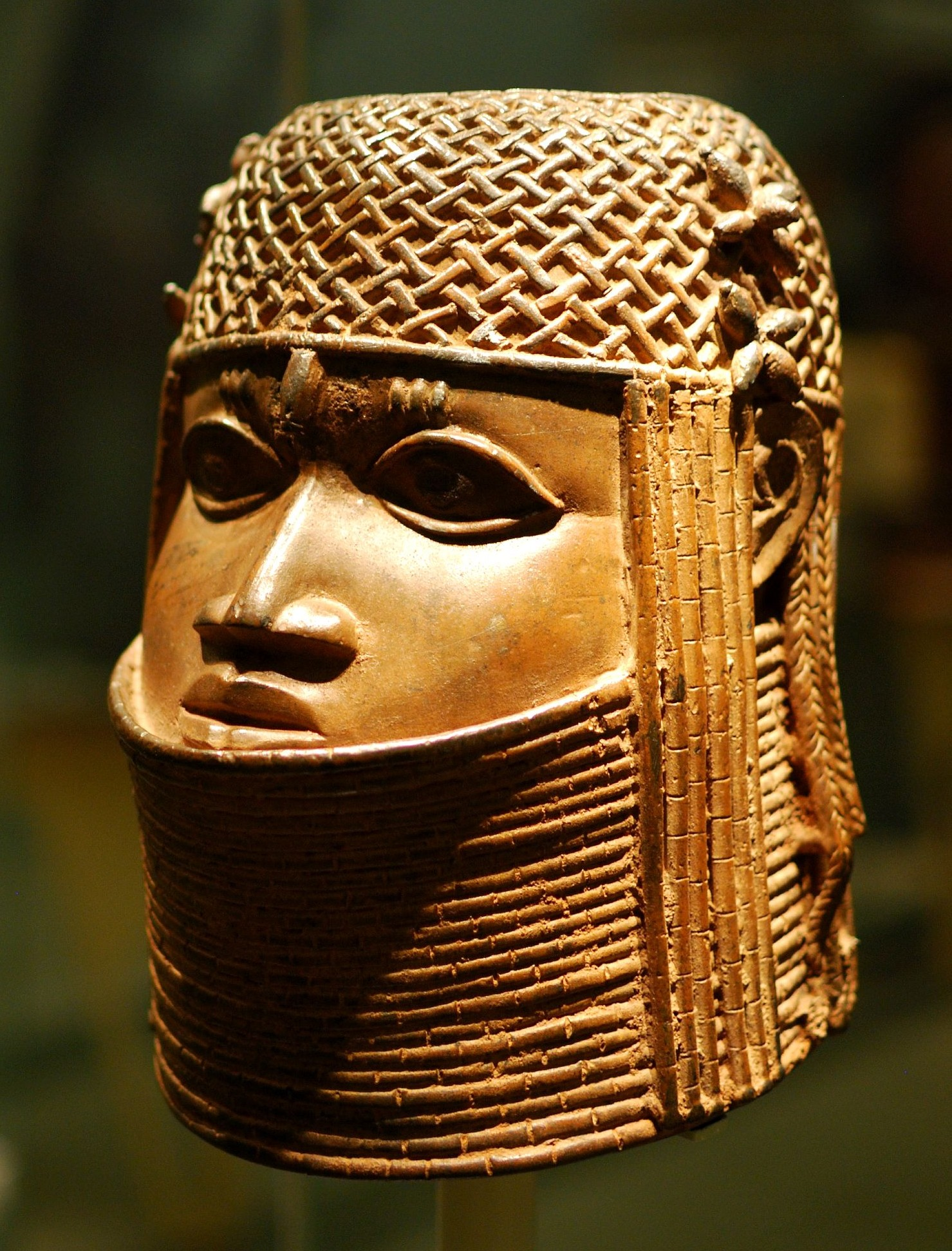
Head of an oba, one of the Benin bronzes

The first encounters between the inhabitants of the coast and Europeans, the Portuguese, took place around 1472. The Portuguese began to trade extensively, particularly with the kingdom of Benin. The Portuguese traded European products, especially weapons, for ivory and palm oil and increasingly for slaves. The manillas that the Portuguese used to pay their Nigerian suppliers were melted down again in the Kingdom of Benin to create the bronze artworks that adorned the royal palace as a sign of affluence.

In 1553, the first English expedition arrived in Benin. From then on, European merchant ships regularly anchored on the West African coast, albeit at a safe distance from the mainland due to the mosquitoes in the lagoons and the tropical diseases they spread. Locals came to these ships on barques and conducted their business. The Europeans named the coasts of West Africa after the products that were of interest to them there. The "Ivory Coast" still exists today. The western coast of Nigeria became the slave coast. In contrast to the Gold Coast further west (today's Ghana), the Europeans did not establish any fortified bases here until the middle of the 19th century.

The harbour of Calabar on the historic Bay of Biafra became one of the largest slave trading centres in West Africa. Other important slave harbours in Nigeria were located in Badagry, Lagos in the Bay of Benin and Bonny Island. Most of the enslaved people brought to these harbours were captured in raids and wars. The most "prolific" slave-trading kingdoms were the Edo Empire of Benin in the south, the Oyo Empire in the south-west and the Aro Confederacy in the south-east.

=== Caliphate of Sokoto (1804 to 1903) ===
In the north, the incessant fighting between the Hausa city-states and the decline of the Bornu Empire led to the Fulani gaining a foothold in the region. Originally, the Fulani mainly travelled with cattle through the semi-desert region of Sahel in northern Sudan, avoiding trade and mixing with the Sudanese peoples. At the beginning of the 19th century, Usman dan Fodio led a successful jihad against the Hausa kingdoms and founded the centralised caliphate of Sokoto. The empire, with Arabic as its official language, grew rapidly under his rule and that of his descendants, who sent invading armies in all directions. The vast landlocked empire linked the east with western Sudan and penetrated the south, conquering parts of the Oyo kingdom and advancing into the Yoruba heartland of Ibadan. The territory controlled by the empire included much of what is now northern and central Nigeria. The Sultan sent emirs to establish suzerainty over the conquered territories and to promote Islamic civilisation; the emirs in turn grew richer and more powerful through trade and slavery.

By the 1890s, the largest slave population in the world, about two million, was concentrated in the Sokoto Caliphate. Slaves were used on a large scale, especially in agriculture. When the Sokoto Caliphate disintegrated into various European colonies in 1903 from conflicts such as the Adamawa Wars, it was one of the largest pre-colonial African states.

=== British ban on the slave trade (from 1807) ===
Around 1750, British merchant ships shipped European goods to Africa, and slaves were taken to American plantations. Products from America, such as tobacco, were then taken to Europe. However, from 1787 and increasingly from 1791, following reports of a slave revolt in Saint Domingue, the British Parliament debated the abolition of the slave trade.

With the prohibition of the slave trade (not slavery) by Britain in 1807, British interest in Nigeria shifted to palm oil for use in soaps and as a lubricant for machinery. However, abolition in Britain was one-sided, and many other countries took its place. European companies and smugglers continued to operate the Atlantic slave trade. The British West Africa Squadron attempted to intercept the smugglers at sea. The rescued slaves were taken to Freetown, a colony in West Africa originally founded by Lieutenant John Clarkson for the resettlement of slaves freed by Britain after the American Revolutionary War in North America.

== British colonial rule ==
=== Crown Colony of Lagos (since 1861) ===
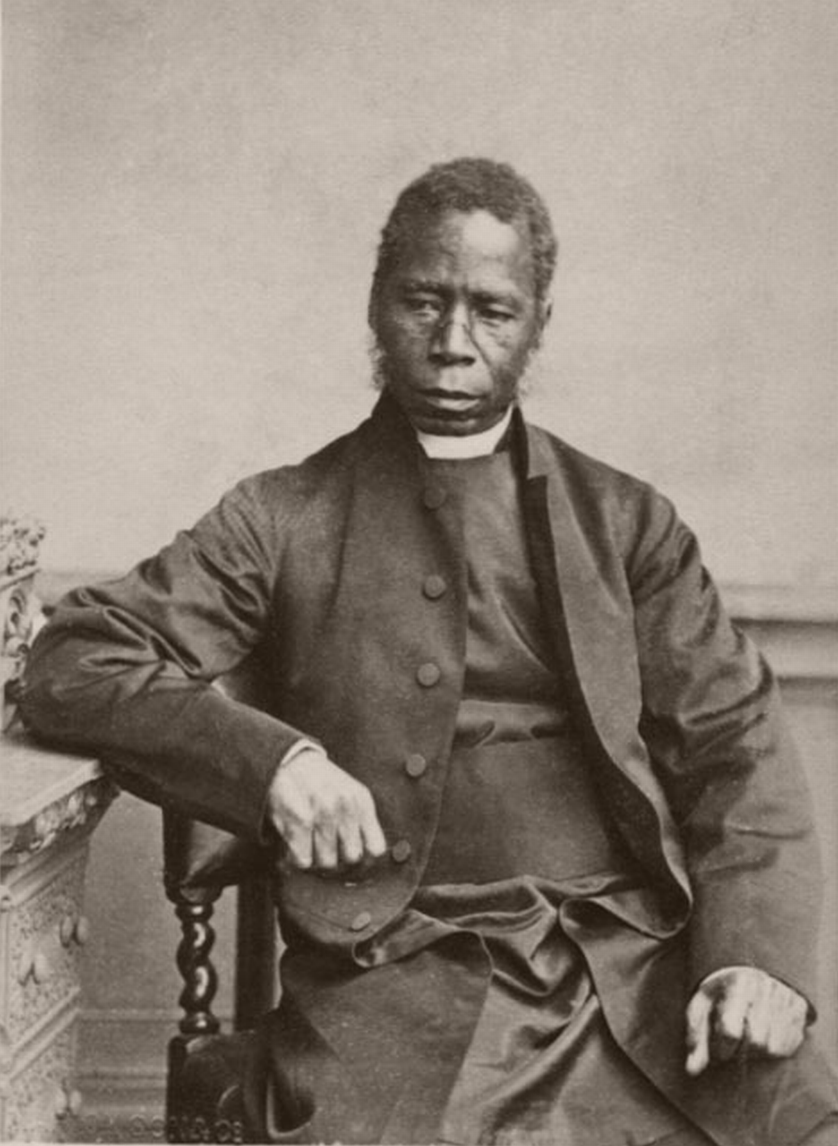
Samuel Ajayi Crowther

Britain's West Africa squadron was tenacious in concluding anti-slavery treaties with coastal chiefdoms along the West African coast from Sierra Leone through the Niger Delta to the south of the Congo. However, the Nigerian coast proved difficult to control with its countless bays, meandering channels and rampant tropical diseases. Badagry, Lagos, Bonny and Calabar therefore remained lively centres of the slave trade. The fight against the slave trade by the British plunged the kingdom of Oyo into a crisis that ultimately led to civil war within the Yoruba region. It became a constant source of prisoners of war for the slave markets.

==== The consulate era ====
In 1841, Oba Akitoye ascended the throne of Lagos and tried to put an end to the slave trade. Some Lagos merchants resisted the ban, deposed the king and replaced him with his nephew Kosoko. Britain intervened in this power struggle within the Lagos royalty by bombarding Lagos with the Royal Navy in 1851. William McCoskry, the acting consul in Lagos, together with Commander Bedingfield, convened a meeting with King Dosunmu, Akitoye's successor, on board HMS Prometheus on 30 July 1861, at which the British intentions around ending the slave trade were explained. Dosunmu resisted the terms of the treaty, but under the threat of having Commander Bedingfield bombard Lagos, he relented and signed the Lagos Cession Treaty.

==== Colonial beginnings, cocoa farming ====
Lagos proved to be strategically useful and became a major trading centre as traders could count on the protection of the Royal Navy to protect them from pirates, for example. British missionaries penetrated further inland. Brazilian freedmen settled in Lagos.

The British government introduced English laws in Lagos in 1862. There was the Court of Civil and Criminal Justice and the West African Court of Appeal. A Supreme Court was established in 1876. English common law, equity law and British law applied.

In the very early colonial period, persons of colour had better opportunities for advancement in Nigeria's colonial administration than in subsequent decades. Examples: Charles Pike, the son of a British man and a Saro woman, led the colonial administration in Lagos as deputy governor in 1885 and 1886 (the Lagos colony did not have its own governor yet); he had previously headed the customs and treasury departments. A.C. Willoughby was chief of police in colonial Lagos from 1881 to at least 1886. John Augustus Otunba Payne was Chief Registrar of the Supreme Court of Lagos and Sheriff. Nash A. Williams was a Crown prosecutor. W.T.G. Lawson was a leading surveyor, and his maps from this period have been preserved. – However, from 1898 onwards, the British Colonial Office under Joseph Chamberlain ensured that local colonial officials above the position of ‘chief clerk’ were replaced by white people. By 1900, only Henry Carr, as inspector of schools and assistant colonial secretary, held a higher position in the British colonial administration of Nigeria. After Carr's departure in 1928, the senior colonial administration of Nigeria was a purely Caucasian affair until independence in 1960 – even when Nigeria's independence took shape in the 1950s, the higher civil service ranks remained reserved for light-skinned people. The British did not raise any local senior administrative officials until they left in 1960, which led to difficulties after independence.

==== Push into the hinterland ====
After its experiences in the American War of Independence, Great Britain had limited itself to maintaining strategically placed bases around the world - such as Lagos - and avoided colonising regions far from the coast. This changed in the 1860s, when European powers embarked on the "Scramble for Africa". Up until this point, European trade with the natives was conducted by ships that anchored off the coast and travelled on once the business was concluded. As tropical lagoons - unlike the open sea - offer favourable conditions for mosquitoes, which pass on tropical diseases, Europeans avoided going ashore. Because of the "sleeping sickness", West Africa was nicknamed "The white man's grave" until around 1850. The industrial production of quinine from the 1820s and its use as a prophylactic against malaria on a large scale changed the situation. The European naval powers were now able to establish permanent settlements in the tropics.

British missionaries penetrated the interior of the country. In south-eastern Nigeria, Hope Wadell and Mary Slessor fought against the customary killing of newborn twins, against the trial by ordeal in legal disputes and against the killing of the servants of deceased village elders (in order to be able to serve them in the afterlife) from 1845 onwards. Missionaries founded schools and enabled the careers of Eyo Ita, the first dark-skinned professor, and Nnamdi Azikiwe, the first Nigerian president, for example. In 1864, Samuel Ajayi Crowther became the first African bishop of the Anglican Church.

=== The Royal Niger Company, the monopolist on the Niger ===
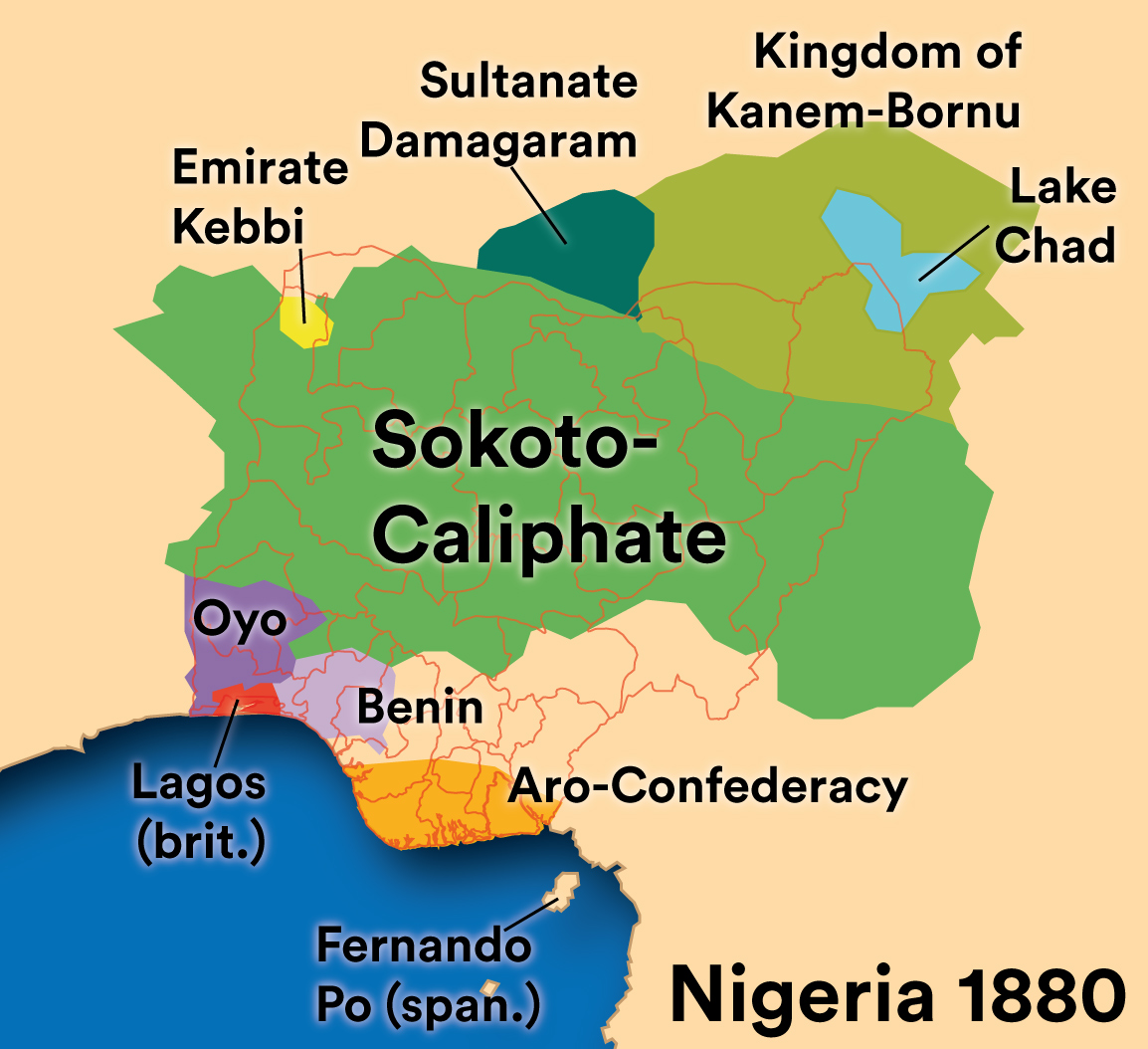
Nigeria 1880

Seeking high profits, various private trading companies promoted European influence in West Africa. One of them was the United Africa Company, founded by George Goldie in 1879. It was granted concessions for the entire area around the Niger Basin by the British government in 1886 under the name Royal Niger Company. The RNC marked out its territory as if it were a state in its own right and also negotiated treaties with the northern states, the Sokoto Caliphate, Nupe and Gwandu. It was also authorised to administer justice in its territories.

The RNC's more than 400 contracts with local leaders obliged the natives to trade exclusively with or through the company's agents. High tariffs and royalties drove competing companies out of the territory. When King Jaja of Opobo organised his own trading network and even began routing his own palm oil shipments to Britain, he was lured onto a British warship and exiled to St Vincent on charges of 'breach of treaty' and 'obstruction of trade'.

Prohibitive rules regarding trade led to conflict with the local Brass people. In 1895, the Brass attacked the RNC's property in Akassa.

=== After the Berlin Congo Conference ===
The Berlin Congo Conference of 1885 defined the spheres of interest of the European colonial powers in Africa - without regard to ethnic or cultural conditions and without the participation of the people in the affected regions. For example, the territory of the Yoruba and that of the Hausa was divided by the demarcation between the British and the French. This fragmentation naturally made it easier for the colonial rulers to dominate the indigenous people. The conference also encouraged military advances by Europeans in Africa - with devastating consequences for the "natives". This was due to the fact that a colonial power's demarcated territories were only valid if that colonial power actually brought the area under its control (rather than another power first).

==== Conquest of Ijebu (1892) and Oyo (1895) ====
The United Kingdom now took military action wherever British traders or missionaries saw their fields of activity restricted. In 1892, the British conquered the Ijebu Empire on the outskirts of Lagos, an empire that had previously seceded from the Oyo Empire and refused to engage in trade with the British. Machine guns (of the Maxim type) were used for the first time. One Captain Lugard (see below) noted: "On the West Coast, in the 'Jebu' war, undertaken by Government, I have been told 'several thousands' were mowed down by the Maxim."

In 1895, it was now not the British traders who called for military action, but missionaries in the Oyo Empire 50 km north of Lagos - which, even after its decline, was still one of the most powerful native states in present-day Nigeria and restricted the activities of the missionaries. The British bombed the capital Ibadan after Christian missionaries had brought their parishioners to safety. After the bombardment, the missionaries had a "fair" talk with the elector-king (Alaafin) of Ibadan and convinced him to submit to British protection. Anglican Christianity became the "state religion" in Oyo.

The conquered territory was administered as the British "Protectorate of Yorubaland", while Lagos remained a colony. Residents of a colony were direct subjects of the Crown and could, for example, initiate legal proceedings against the colonial rulers. Residents of a protectorate did not have these rights.

==== The punitive expedition to the Kingdom of Benin in 1897 ====
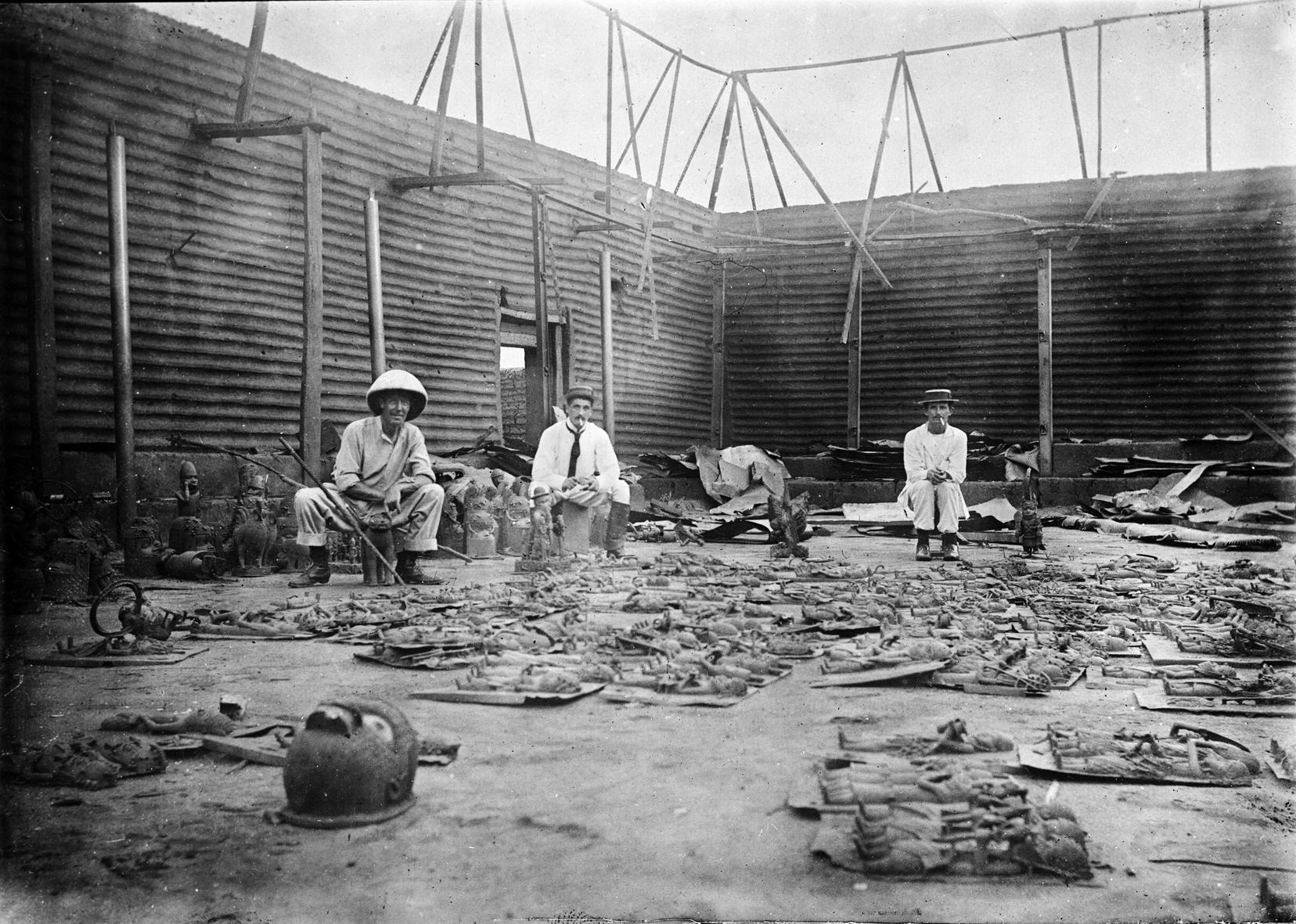
The burnt-down royal palace of Benin with the looted bronze sculptures

Benin was a slave-owning state 150 kilometres east of Lagos and was one of the four largest kingdoms in what is now Nigeria. As early as 1862, there were reports of human sacrifices being made in Benin in times of need. Consul Burton described the kingdom as "gratuitous barbarity which stinks of death".

In 1892, Great Britain concluded a contract with King (Oba) Ovọnramwẹn of Benin for the supply of palm oil. The latter signed reluctantly and shortly afterwards made additional financial demands. In 1896, Vice-Consul Phillips travelled to Ovọnramwẹn with 18 officials, 180 porters and 60 local workers to renegotiate the contract. He sent a delegate ahead with gifts to announce his visit - but the king sent word that he did not wish to receive the visit for the time being (King Ovọnramwẹn was aware of the fate of King Jaja of Opobo (see above), which could explain his lack of hospitality). Phillips nevertheless set off, but was ambushed, from which only two of his fellow travellers escaped alive, albeit seriously injured.

In February 1897, a punitive expedition was set up under Admiral Rawson. The Colonial Office in London ruled: "It is imperative that a most severe lesson be given the Kings, Chiefs, and JuJu men of all surrounding countries, that white men cannot be killed with impunity..." 5,000 British soldiers and sailors invaded the Kingdom of Benin, which barely defended itself but made the above-mentioned human sacrifices.

The Kingdom of Benin was incorporated into the British dominion. The British burnt down the royal palace of Benin and looted the bronze sculptures there, which are now a World Heritage Site. These were later auctioned off in Europe to finance the punitive expedition.

==== The West African Frontier Force ====
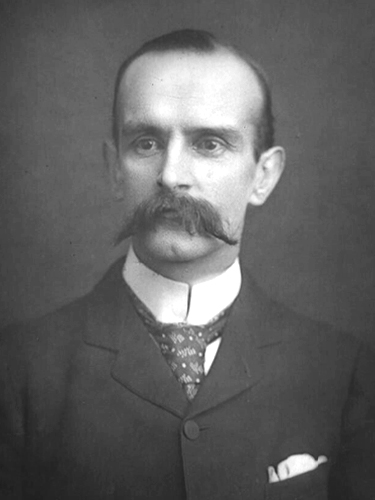
Frederick Lugard, the creator of Nigeria as a state entity

In 1897, Captain Lugard, who had already established and stabilised British colonial rule in Malawi and Uganda, was commissioned to set up an indigenous Nigerian force to protect British interests in the hinterland of the colony of Lagos and Nigeria against French attacks. In August 1897, Lugard organised the West African Frontier Force and commanded it until the end of December 1899. By September 1898, Britain and France had already settled their colonial disputes in the Fashoda Crisis and concluded the Entente cordiale in 1904, thus depriving the WAFF of its original purpose (However, the WAFF was to play a crucial role in the liberation of East Africa from (fascist) Italian rule during the Second World War in 1941. Colonel Lugard would significantly determine Nigeria's development over the next 22 years.

==== First railway line ====
The first railway line in West and Central Africa - between Lagos and Abeokuta - was opened in Nigeria in 1898 (However, it was followed shortly afterwards by the British colony of Gold Coast/Ghana (1901), the German colonies of Cameroon (1901) and Togo (1905) and the French colonies of Dahomey (1906) and Ivory Coast (1907)). Forced labour was also (or mainly) used in the construction work. The staff of the railway company soon organised themselves and organised Nigeria's first strike in 1904.

=== Southern Nigeria (since 1900) ===
==== The Royal Niger Company sells its land ====
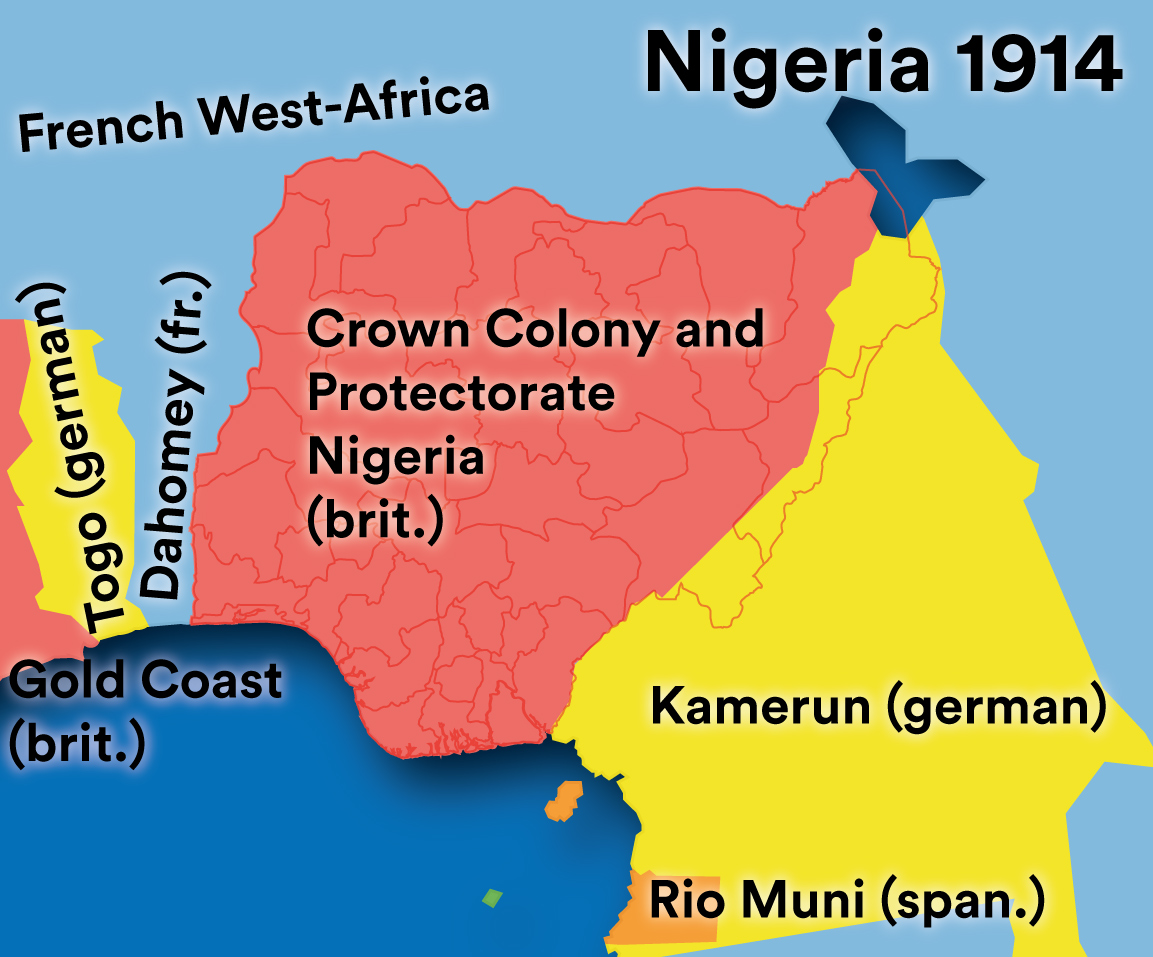
Nigeria 1914

The RNC's concession was revoked in 1899, and on 1 January 1900 it ceded its territories to the British government for the sum of £865,000. The ceded territory was merged with the small Niger Coast Protectorate, which had been under British control since 1884, to form the Southern Nigeria Protectorate, and the remaining RNC territory of around 1.3 million square kilometres became the Northern Nigeria Protectorate. The RNC was taken over by Lever Brothers in 1920 and became part of the Unilever Group in 1929. In 1939, the latter still controlled 80 per cent of Nigerian exports, mainly cocoa, palm oil and rubber.

==== The south-east ====
Due to the complex coastline in the Niger Delta, there were no closed dominions in south-east Nigeria until 1900, but rather a conglomerate of city-states that focussed on trade along the coast and inland along the Niger and Benue rivers. These city-states, which were united in the "Aro Confederacy", had a religious centre in Arochukwu, the "Juju Oracle". The form of decision-making in the city-states can be described as "pre-democratic". In this region, which later became sadly known as "Biafra", feudal rule was just as difficult to enforce as British colonial rule. (The later Biafra War of 1966 to 1970 was, among other things, a conflict between the democratic instincts of the south-eastern Igbo population and the authoritarian structures in the rest of Nigeria). The British defeated the Aro Confederacy in the Anglo-Aro War (1901–1902) and spread their influence along the coast to the south-east as far as German Cameroon. However, control of the Niger Delta remained an unsolved problem both for the British colonial rulers and later for independent Nigeria. Pirates, marauders, self-proclaimed freedom fighters and (since 1957) oil thieves still find enough nooks and crannies in the confusing landscape and under the jungle canopy to evade police action.

==== After 1902 ====
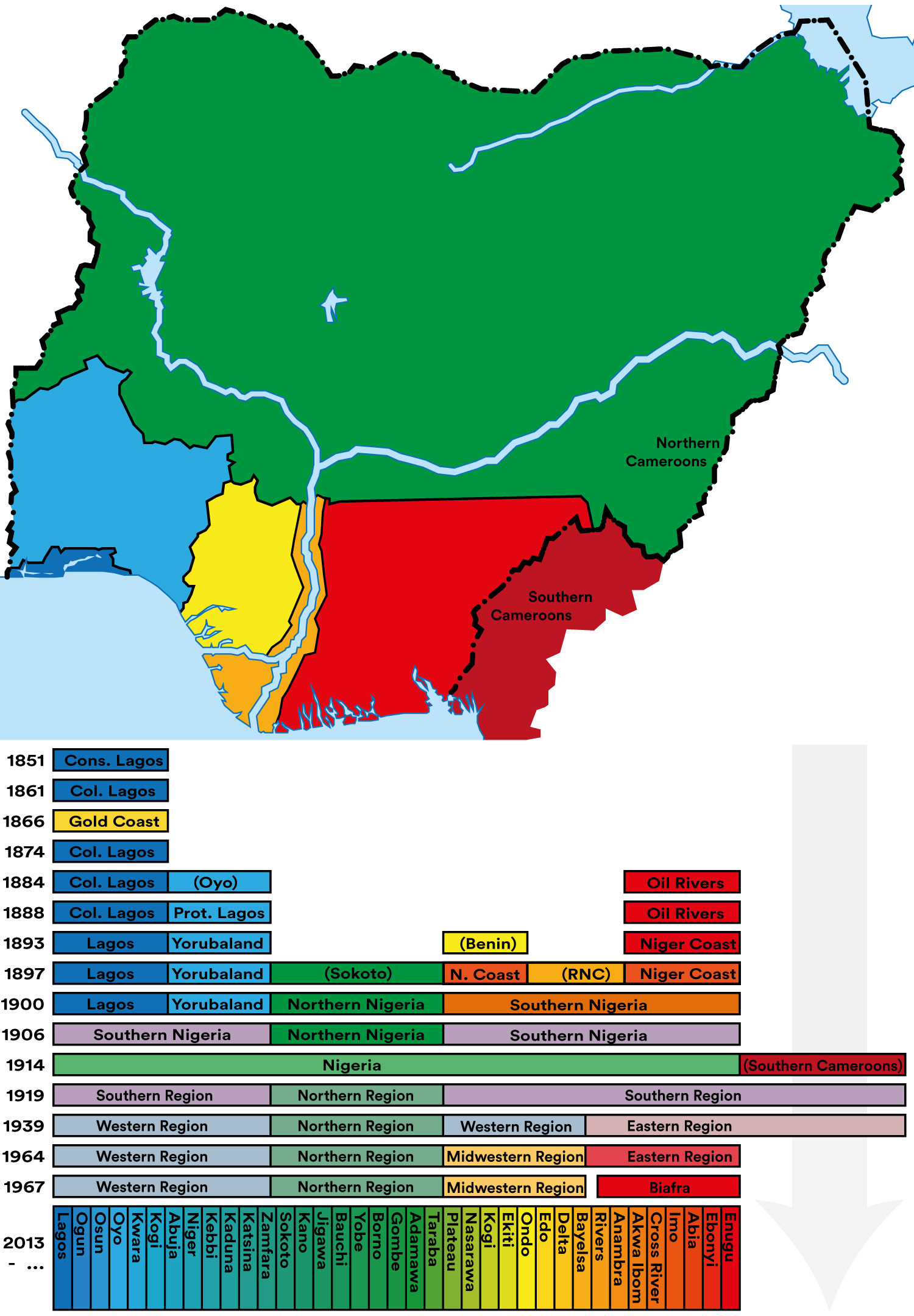
Administrative entities in Nigeria and the Cameroons 1851 to today

In 1906, the crown colony of Lagos was incorporated into the protectorate of Southern Nigeria.

In Lekki, near Lagos, the Nigerian Bitumen Corporation under businessman John Simon Bergheim discovered crude oil during test drilling in 1908. However, engineers were unable to prevent large quantities of water from being extracted as well. Oil production could therefore not be made profitable without additional investment. Bergheim's fatal car accident in 1912 put an end to further exploration of Nigeria's oil reserves for the time being.

In 1909, coal deposits were discovered and extracted in the south-east of Nigeria, in Enugu Two years later, this region, the Nti Kingdom, was placed directly under British colonial administration.

Despite the consecration of Samuel Ajayi Crowther as a bishop - or perhaps because of it - European and North American churches refused to accept dark-skinned clergymen, while the mainly Protestant missionary work in southern Nigeria was quite successful. This led to countless evangelistic and Pentecostal free churches, which are still omnipresent in the south today.

Nigeria's first trade union, the Nigeria Civil Service Union, was formed in 1912, but would not be recognised until 1938, until which time its members were subjected to harassment.

=== Northern Nigeria (since 1900) ===
In 1900, Colonel Lugard was appointed High Commissioner of the newly created Protectorate of Northern Nigeria. He read the proclamation at Mount Patti in Lokoja that established the protectorate on 1 January 1900, but at this time the part of northern Nigeria that was actually under British control was still small.

==== North-east ====
In 1893, Rabih az-Zubayr, a Sudanese warlord, conquered the Kingdom of Bornu. The British recognised Rabih as "Sultan of Borno" until the French killed Rabih at the Battle of Kousséri on 22 April 1900. The colonial powers of Great Britain, France and Germany divided up his territory, with the British receiving what is now north-east Nigeria. They formally restituted the Borno Empire under British rule before the conquest in 1893 and appointed a scion of the ruling family of the time, Abubakar Garbai, as "Shehu" (Sheikh).

==== Northwest ====
In 1902, the British advanced north-westwards into the Sokoto Caliphate. In 1903, victory at the Battle of Kano gave the British a logistical advantage in pacifying the heartland of the Sokoto Caliphate and parts of the former Borno Empire. On 13 March 1903, the last vizier of the caliphate surrendered. By 1906, resistance to British rule had ended, and there would be no more war within Nigeria's borders for the next 60 years. When Lugard resigned as commissioner in 1906, the entire region of present-day Nigeria was administered under British supervision.

==== The Protectorate of Northern Nigeria, the ‘Indirect Rule’ ====
After the British trauma of the siege of Khartoum, the colonial office favoured a more subtle approach in Islamic northern Nigeria. Lugard developed the concept of ‘Indirect Rule’, in which the colonial rulers left the traditional social structures intact. The Sokoto Caliphate was formally allowed to continue and a new caliph, Attahiru II, was appointed in 1903. Murray Last therefore refers to the Protectorate of Northern Nigeria as the ‘Colonial Caliphate’. The British governor could depose emirs and Lugard did this ten times in 1906 alone.

The emirs carried out British instructions (such as drafting recruits during the world wars) and presided over a court that spoke Islamic Maliki law but, following the opinion of the orientalist Joseph Schacht, took British law into ‘supplementary’ consideration. Over the next few decades, Islamic law in northern Nigeria was continually restricted and by the 1940s only applied to family and inheritance law.

=== Unification into "Crown Colony and Protectorate" 1914, Governor Lugard ===
Colonial Flag of Nigeria

In 1912, after an interlude in Hong Kong, Lugard returned as governor of the two Nigerian protectorates. He merged the two colonies into one.

In the same year, Lugard, who found the inhabitants of Lagos rebellious, had a new seaport built in the south-east as a rival to Lagos and named it Port Harcourt after his superior in the Colonial Office. This seaport soon received a railway line to Enugu and shipped the coal mined there (from 1958 also crude oil) overseas.

==== Unification and yet separation ====
Lugard became the first governor of All Nigeria. The unification of Nigeria helped to give Nigeria common telegraphs, railways, customs and excise duties, uniform time, a common currency and a common civil service. Lugard thus introduced what was needed for the infrastructure of a modern state. However, the north and south remained as two separate countries with separate administrations.

Regional differences in access to modern education soon became pronounced. Some children of the southern elite went to Britain for higher education. The imbalance between North and South was also reflected in Nigeria's political life. For example, slavery was not banned in northern Nigeria until 1936, while it was abolished in other parts of Nigeria around 1885. Northern Nigeria still had between 1 million and 2.5 million slaves around 1900.

The attempt to enforce this system in the south also met with varying degrees of success. In the Yoruba region of the south-west, the British were able to tie in with existing or formerly existing kingdoms and their borders. However, as there were no hierarchical or even feudal structures in the south-east through which the British could indirectly rule, they appointed "Warrant Chiefs" with powers to act as local representatives of the British administration among their people. However, the British did not realise that in some parts of Africa the concept of "chiefs" or "kings" was not known. Among the Igbo, for example, decisions were made through lengthy debates and general consensus. The new powers vested in the Warrant Chiefs and reinforced by the native court system led to an exercise of power and authority unprecedented in pre-colonial times. The Warrant Chiefs also used their power to amass wealth at the expense of their subjects. The Warrant Chiefs were corrupt, arrogant and accordingly hated.

== The Six Nigerian Signatories in the Formation of Nigeria ==
The Southern Protectorate and Northern Protectorate were amalgamated on January 1, 1914 to form the present day Nigeria. The document was signed in Zungeru, Niger State by Sir Frederick Lugard (a British administrator who became the first Governor General of Nigeria) as the Bristish representative and the following six Nigerian leaders:

- HRH Maiturare Sarkin Musulumi, Sultan of Sokoto
- Usman Dan Maje, who later become the Emir of Kano
- Sir Kitoyi Ajasa, a prominent Nigerian lawyer from Lagos
- HRH Oladugbolu, the Alaafin of Oyo
- HRH Richard Henshaw, the Obong of Calabar
- Abubakar Shehu, a representative of Borno

=== Racial approaches in the army ===
From the outset, British colonial rule utilised - and reinforced - the differences between the ethnic groups present in order to offer itself to each side as a power-preserving factor and to be able to control the oversized colony with relatively little military expenditure (4,200 British soldiers). In the south, education, economy and civilisational achievements dominated, while in the north the military, feudalism and Islamic traditions were deliberately reinforced by the British. While officer positions were filled with British, enlisted men, non-commissioned officers and higher non-commissioned officer positions (sergeant majors) were exclusively filled with northern Nigerians, as these were regarded as "warrior peoples" in accordance with a popular doctrine practised in India since 1857 (e.g. Sikhs, Brahmins). Nigeria thus remained divided in many respects into the northern and southern protectorates and the colony of Lagos.

On Lugard, historian K. B. C. Onwubiko says: "His system of Indirect Rule, his hostility towards educated Nigerians in the South, and his system of education for the North which aimed at training only the sons of the chiefs and emirs as clerks and interpreters show him as one of Britain's arch-imperialists".

=== First World War ===
In August 1914, a British-Nigerian military unit attacked Cameroon. After 18 months, the German Imperial Schutztruppe surrendered to a superior force of British, Nigerians, Belgians and French. Some German units were able to escape to the Spanish and thus neutral Rio Muni (today's Equatorial Guinea).

=== Time between the world wars ===
In the Treaty of Versailles, the German colony of Cameroon was divided up between the British and French as a League of Nations trust territory. In 1920, the western part of the former German colony of Cameroon was administratively annexed to British Nigeria as a League of Nations mandate territory under the name British Cameroons.

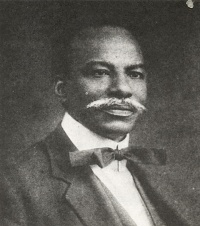
Herbert Macaulay

Lugard's successor (1919–1925), Sir Hugh Clifford, was an avowed opponent of Lugard's views and saw his role not in the efficient running of an apparatus of power, but in the development of the country. He intensified educational efforts in the south and repeatedly suggested to the Colonial Office in London that the power of the absolutist emirs ruling in the north should be limited - which was rejected. This further deepened the de facto division of the country into a northern, south-western and south-eastern part. In the north, the indirect rule aimed at preserving feudal rule continued to apply. In the south, an educated elite based on the European model emerged.

In 1922, Clifford established the Legislative Council. The four elected members were from Lagos (3) and Calabar (1). The Legislative Council enacted laws for the colony and the protectorate of Southern Nigeria. It also approved the annual budget for the entire country. The four elected members were the first Africans to be elected to a parliamentary body in British West Africa. The Clifford Constitution accordingly led to the formation of political parties in Nigeria. Herbert Macaulay, a newspaper owner and grandson of Samuel Ajayi Crowther (see above), founded the first Nigerian political party - the Nigeria National Democratic Party - in 1923. It remained the strongest party in the elections until 1939.

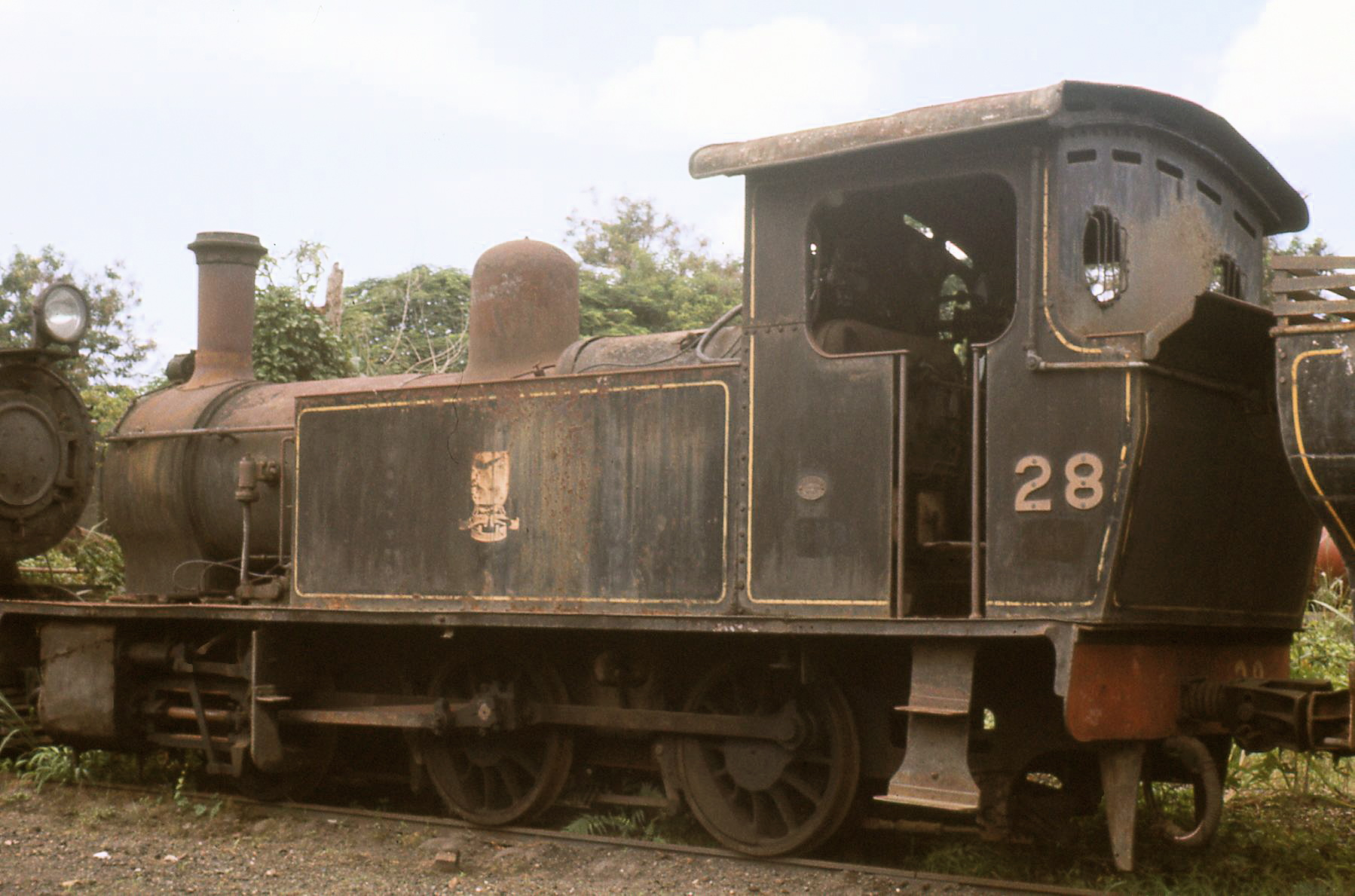
0-6-0 steam locomotive in Lagos (picture from 1974)

The railway company paid very well due to the activities of the well-organised railway workers' union, but also due to competing employers - who were happy to poach skilled workers.

In the meantime, it had become clear that colonies were not as profitable as hoped. The new governor Graeme Thomson therefore introduced harsh austerity measures in 1925, including massive redundancies and the introduction of direct taxation. The planned tax on women market traders, Graeme Thomson's undiplomatic manner and the unpopular Warrant Chief system led to the "Women's War" of 1929 among the Igbo. The women farmers destroyed ten native courts by December 1929, when the troops restored order in the region. In addition, the houses of chiefs and employees of the native courts were attacked, European factories looted, prisons attacked, and prisoners released. The women demanded the removal of the Warrant Chiefs and their replacement by native clan chiefs appointed by the people and not by the British. 55 women were killed by the colonial troops. Nevertheless, the Women's War of 1929 led to fundamental reforms in the British colonial administration. The British abolished the system of "Warrant Chiefs" and reviewed the nature of colonial rule over the natives of Nigeria. In place of the old Warrant Chief system, tribunals were introduced that took into account the indigenous system of government that had prevailed before colonial rule.

In 1933, the Lagos Youth Movement - later the Nigerian Youth Movement - was founded and took a more strident stance in favour of independence than the NNDP. In 1938, the NYM called for Nigeria to be granted British Dominion status, putting it on a par with Australia or Canada. In 1937, it was joined by Nnamdi Azikiwe, who had been exiled from Ghana/Gold Coast for seditious activities and who became publisher and editor-in-chief of the West African Pilot and father of Nigerian popular journalism. In 1938, the NYM protested against the cocoa cartel, which kept the purchase prices from farmers artificially low. In 1939, the NYM became the strongest party in the elections in Lagos and Calabar (no elections were held elsewhere).

In 1935, the railway network reached its maximum expansion after the last investment projects were completed. It comprised 2,851 km of track. This made the Nigerian railway network the longest and most complex in West and Central Africa. In 1916, a 550 m-long (1,800 ft) railway bridge over the Niger River and in 1934 a bridge over the Benue River connected the regional railway networks.

In 1931, the influential Nigerian Union of Teachers was founded under its president Israel Oludotun Ransome-Kuti (the father of Fela Kuti). Nigeria's first industrial union, the railway workers' union, was also founded in 1931 by lathe operator Michael Imoudu. In 1939, trade unions were permitted by decree by the colonial administration, but Imoudu was arrested in 1943. The railway workers' union was considered the most militant workers' union in Nigeria. Imoudu remained under house arrest until 1945.

Governor Cameron standardised the administration of the Northern and Southern Provinces in the 1930s by introducing a native appellate court system, High Courts and Magistrate Courts.

Bernard Bourdillon became governor of Nigeria in 1935 and remained so for eight years. He maintained close contact with local politicians, especially the NYM. In the Colonial Office, he succeeded in 1938 in ensuring that the purchasing cartel for West African products such as cocoa, palm oil and peanuts was no longer supported by the British government.

=== Second World War ===
==== Rationing, price control, agricultural damage, education offensive ====
As early as 1939, the Nigeria Supply Board was set up to promote the production of rubber and palm oil, which were considered important for the war effort, at the expense of food production. The import of agricultural products was restricted.

From 1942, farmers were only allowed to sell rice, maize, beans etc. to government agencies and at a very low price under the "Pullen Scheme" so that the British Isles, which were cut off from the continent, could be supplied with food at low cost. However, this price control motivated farmers to either not sell their products at all or to sell them on the black market. Others may have resorted to growing unregulated, i.e. inedible, produce. Nigeria's agriculture, which had already suffered from the European purchasing cartels (especially Unilever) and the Great Depression, was once again hampered in its development. In December 1942, consumer goods were rationed. (Rationing would last until 1948.) The transport of rice from Abeokuta to nearby Lagos was criminalised.

As a "positive" effect of the Second World War, the colonial administration trained war-critical skilled labour such as technicians, electricians, nurses, carpenters and clerks on a large scale during this period. New harbours and - for the first time - airports were built.

From October 1941 to January 1945, the 44th British General Hospital was stationed in Abeokuta, not far from Lagos. Soldiers, airmen and sailors could recover from their injuries here. There was also the 46th British General Hospital in Kaduna in 1942 and 1943.

==== Nigerian regiments, advance in Somaliland and Ethiopia ====
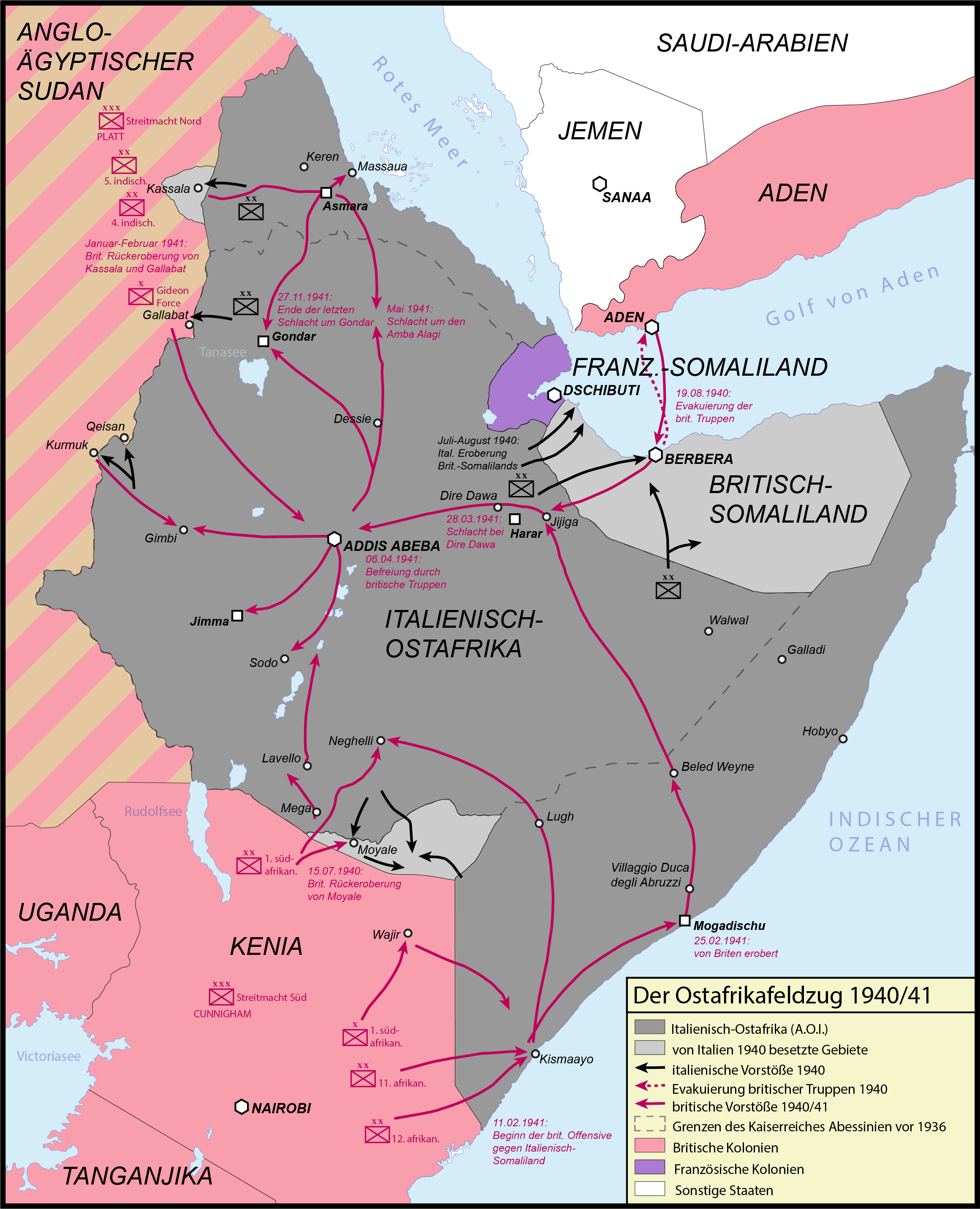
Advance of British-African troops in the East African campaign of 1941 (German labelling)

Throughout the war, 45,000 Nigerian soldiers served in the British forces in Africa and South-East Asia. Nigerian regiments formed the majority of the British Army's 81st and 82nd West African Divisions. These divisions fought in Palestine, Morocco, Sicily and Burma. Nigerian soldiers also fought in India.

Three battalions of the Nigeria Regiment fought in the Ethiopian campaign against fascist Italy. In Kenya, four brigades from the 11th (African) Division and the 12th (African) Division formed the 23rd (Nigerian) Brigade, which was attached to the 1st (African) Division. On 26 March 1941 the Nigeria Regiment captured Harar near Djibouti after an advance of 1,600 km in 32 days. At the time, this was the fastest military advance in world history. Addis Ababa was conquered by the Allies on 6 April. The Ethiopian campaign became the Allies' first major success against the Axis powers, not least due to the "Blitzkrieg" of the Nigeria regiment.

==== Ideas from India on independence ====
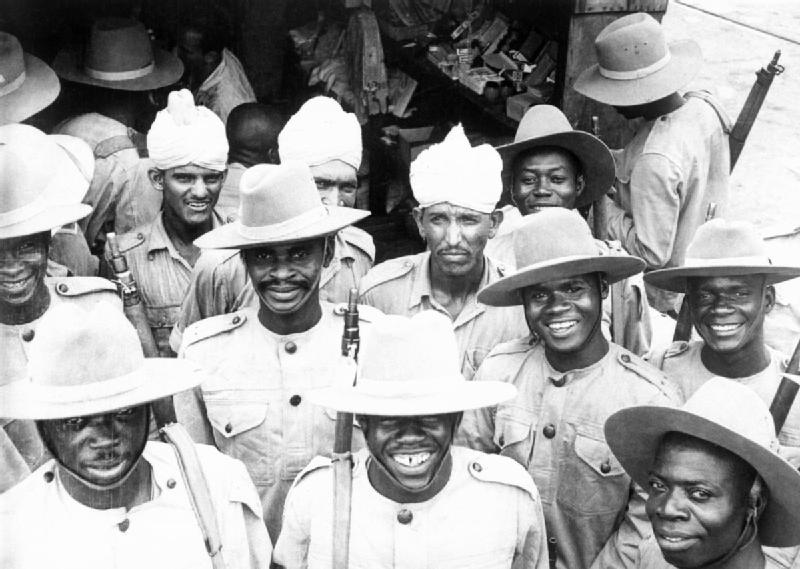
The Nigeria Regiment on arrival in India

Fighting for the Allies were 600,000 volunteers from Africa, who had been promised equal brotherhood in arms with their Caucasian fellow soldiers. Nevertheless, they received less pay than their European or Asian counterparts. Corporal punishment (flogging) was also still a disciplinary punishment exclusively for black soldiers. In northern Nigeria, it is not necessarily possible to speak of "voluntary" recruits, as the local tribal chiefs were prescribed contingents of "volunteers" as part of the Indirect Rule. The absolutist rulers did not necessarily take into account the voluntary nature of the troops when providing them for service at the front. During the war, none of the commanding officers of the Nigerian Corps came from Nigeria. (The first Nigerian officers received their licences at the end of the war).

The Nigerian soldiers can hardly have been unaware of the contradiction between their reality and the propagated British interpretation of wanting to protect Africa from German and Italian colonisation. In addition, the Nigerian troops had been fighting alongside their Indian comrades for several years and there was already a strong and media-effective independence movement against British colonial rule in the latter's homeland under Mahatma Gandhi and other prominent independence activists. (India became independent just 22 months after the Second World War.) The exchange of ideas with the Indians striving for independence almost certainly contributed to the fact that Nigerian soldiers returned home from Burma in January 1946 with completely new ideas about an independent Nigeria, but with less patience.

In his victory speech, the commander of the troops in Burma, Sir William Slim, did not mention the Nigerian "brothers in arms" at all.

=== Post-war period, the road to independence ===
During the Second World War, the number of Nigerian trade union members had increased sixfold to 30,000. A general strike by railway workers for higher wages and for the release of imprisoned trade unionists such as Michael Imoudu (see above) made it clear in 1945 that the previous colonial administration had to be replaced by a new, national form of government.

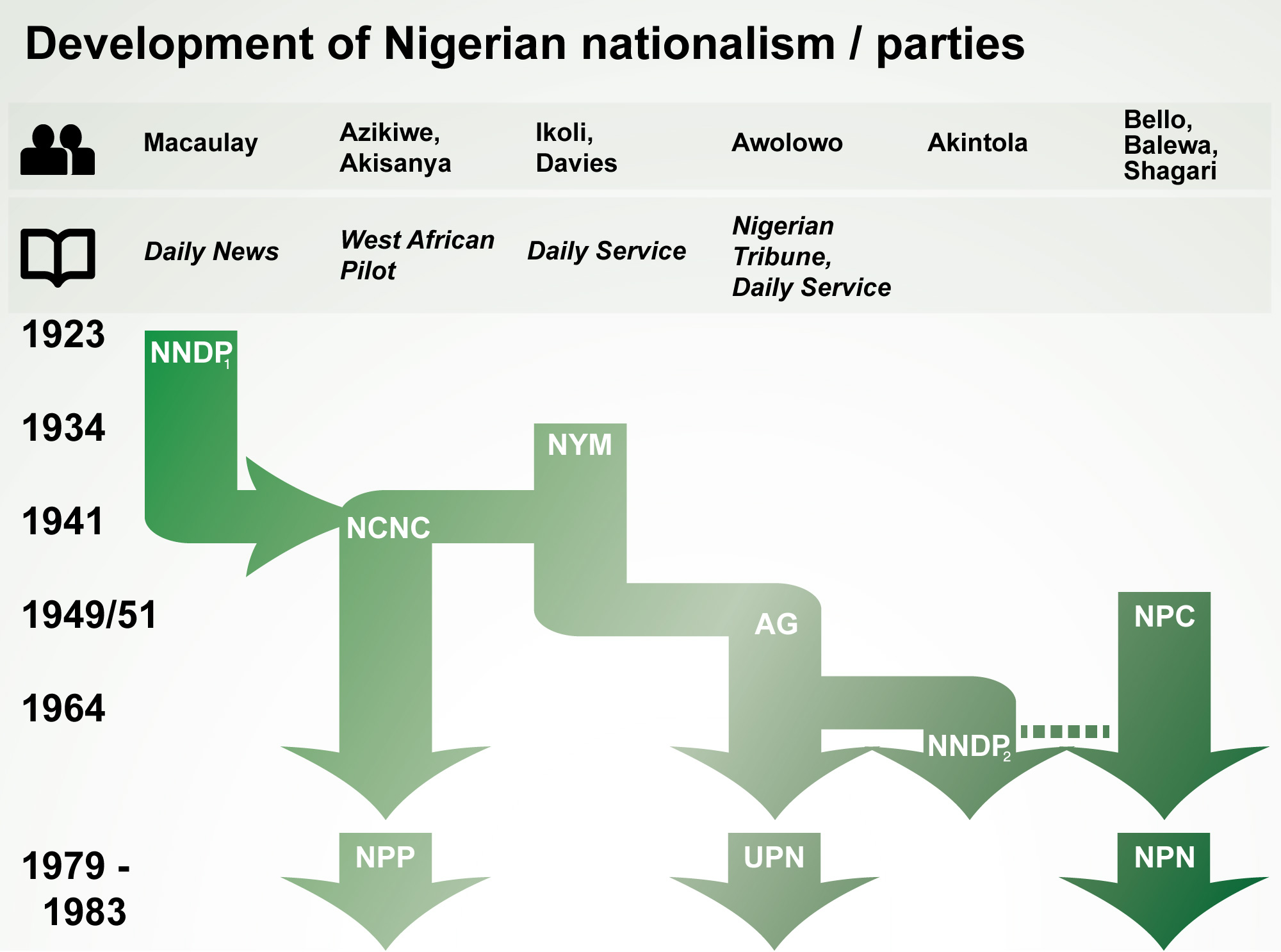
Development of Nigerian nationalism; parties, main persons and allocated newspapers

The new governor of Nigeria, Richards, like Graeme Thomson and Bourdillon an ‘Oxford man’, introduced a constitution in 1946 that turned the country into a federation consisting of three states with uninspiring names such as ‘Northern/Western/Eastern Region’ and their own parliaments, governments and constitutions (the East had one house of parliament, the West and North a bicameral system). These would establish a central government for customs matters, common foreign policy and defence.

In retrospect, the Richards Constitution must be viewed critically and it was also viewed critically by Nigerians at the time. Money was collected in a campaign to enable the three most respected compatriots (newspaper publisher Macaulay, trade union leader Imoudu and journalist Azikiwe) to travel to London to present their views (ultimately unsuccessfully) to the Attlee government there. The British government in faraway London was apparently of the opinion that it knew better what was good for Nigerians than Nigerians themselves. After all, the constitution was slightly modified in 1951 and 1954; the last version, finally adopted by and named after the colonial minister Oliver Lyttelton, the son of the 4th Baron Lyttleton and later himself 1st Viscount Chandos, was the constitution with which Nigeria would become independent in 1960. Although there had been two conferences on the subject (one in London, the other in Lagos), these only had an advisory function: the constitution of independent Nigeria of 1960 was not the result of a constituent assembly of Nigerians, but a creation of British colonial ministers and governors, among whom (both) English aristocrats and Oxford graduates were still predominant at the time - representatives of the British upper class.

In this federation of just three federal states, the political process naturally became more of a conflict than a co-operation. Accordingly, the dominant political parties were organised along ethnic lines:

- The Northern Peoples Congress (NPC) represented the eponymous northern Nigerians, especially the Hausa, and was led by one of the highest nobles of the north, Ahmadu Bello,
- The National Council of Nigeria and the Cameroons (NCNC) represented the Igbo in the south-east after the death of Herbert Macaulay under the leadership of journalist Nnamdi Azikiwe, and
- The Action Group (AG) represented the Yoruba in the south-west and had Obafemi Awolowo as party leader.

In 1952, the regional parliaments were elected; for the Northern State, this was the first free election in its history. As expected, all three parties won a majority in their respective states and ethnic groups, with Bello, Azikiwe and Awolowo becoming prime ministers of their respective states. The governments of the North, South-West and South-East each constitutionally sent three ministers to the central government in Lagos. Accordingly, state revenues were also distributed according to a population proportion determined in Nigeria's first census in 1953 (previously there had only been estimates). The precarious balance only lasted with the British as the "tip of the scales", but for the nascent nation of Nigeria, without the British, it was only a preliminary stage that would last until one of the three ethnic groups no longer felt sufficiently represented in the federation. The main candidate for this was northern Nigeria and during the Kano riots of May 1953 secession was a distinct possibility. Many Hausa and Fulani favoured a separate, Muslim-majority state over the planned all-Nigeria. This was also due to the jurisprudence in the north. In the 1950s, civil and criminal law was still administered in northern Nigeria by emirs (i.e. by hereditary nobility, not by trained lawyers) in accordance with Sharia law. For northern Nigerians, it was hardly acceptable that this legal system should in future be given a higher instance in the form of the Supreme Court, in which non-Muslims and academically trained experts without a noble title would also be represented.

On the other hand, the south of Nigeria had co-financed the "poor" north in every fiscal year since 1914 (this has not changed until 2023) and even the most ardent advocates of a northern state did not dare to make the necessary tax increases palatable to their supporters. The funding dilemma initially delayed further endeavours for such a separate northern state and ultimately prevented it.

==== Discovery of oil in the south-south ====
In January 1956, the first oil field in Nigeria, the Olobiri Oilfield in the south-south of the country, was discovered.

The new Conservative government in the United Kingdom under Harold Macmillan had been advocating rapid decolonisation in the British Empire since 10 January 1957, following the debacle in the Suez Crisis and in view of the high costs of the loss-making colonial system. In just a few years, Great Britain granted independence to a good dozen African colonies. However, unlike nearby Ghana, for example, Nigeria had not fought for its independence; Nigerian sovereignty had virtually slipped out of Britain's faint hand, exhausted by the Second World War, and fallen into the lap of the unprepared colony. The Nigerian independence movement lacked both the unifying experience of a struggle for freedom and the confirmation of a joint success against the former colonial power.

On 30 August 1957, the former transport minister Abubakar Tafawa Balewa became the first prime minister of Nigeria's (weak) central government.

==== Late farewell to racial ideas ====
From 1958 onwards, the Nigerian army no longer recruited men exclusively from the north, as before, but from all over the country. In the following years, this meant that officer candidates from the south predominantly occupied the numerous positions of the outgoing British officers, as they were generally highly educated. This clashed with the older officers and sergeant majors, who had been taught that their people (Hausa, Fulani, Kanuri) belonged to the "warrior peoples." and that representatives of the southern ethnic groups Yoruba and Igbo were not entitled to the new positions. This conflict was to trigger the Biafra War in 1966.

The first all-Nigerian parliament was elected at the end of 1959. The parties, which saw themselves primarily as representatives of ethnic groups or regions, won according to their population strength. The Northern Peoples Congress won 148 of the 312 seats in the House of Representatives and formed a coalition with several minor parties to gain an absolute majority.

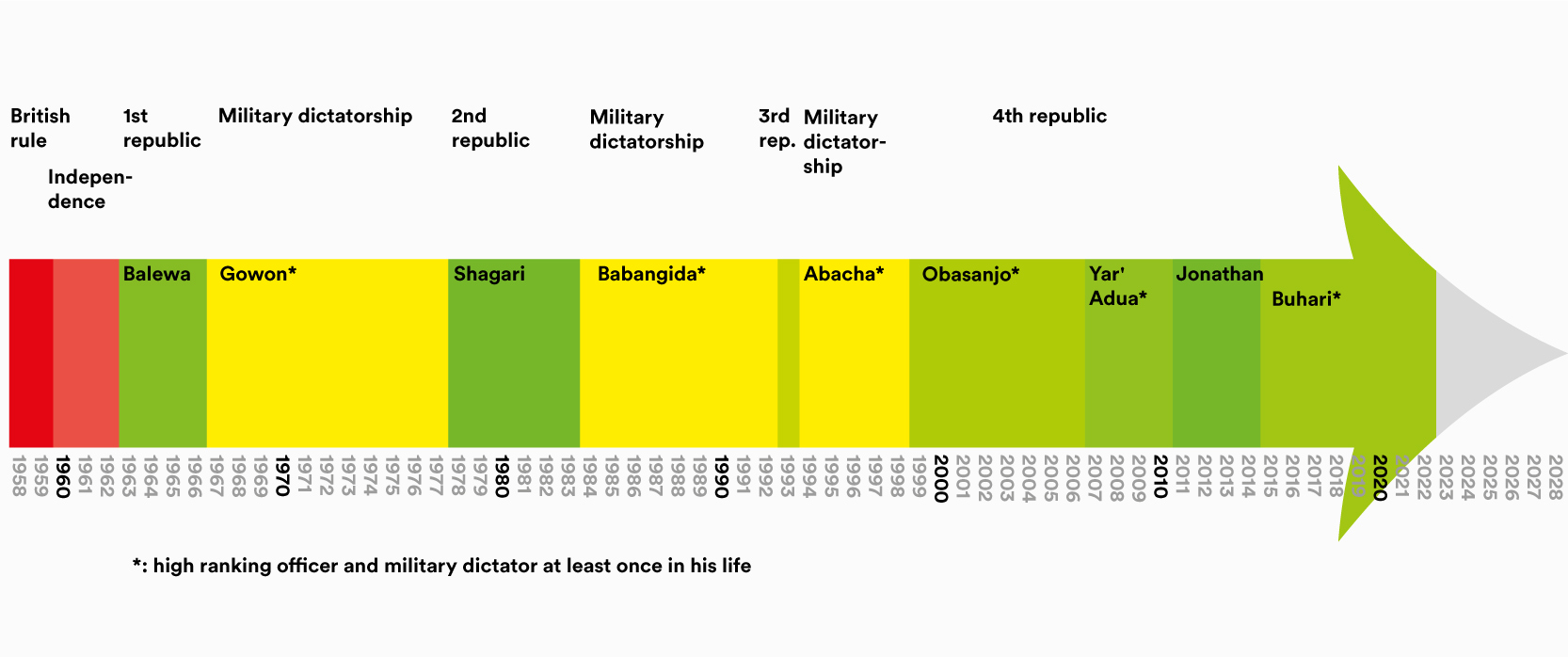
History after 1958; red: British rule, green: democracy; yellow: dictatorship; names: Heads of government with at least 3 years in office

In order to keep the "Giant of Africa" under control and partly because of racial ideology, the British colonial government treated the ethnic and social groups in the country very unequally for decades. In the north, absolutist-feudal systems, and until 1936 even slave-owning systems, had been supported financially and militarily, while in the south conditions had been created that at least did not appear too alien to the Europeans there. In addition, as in francophone countries, an upper class educated in the mother country had been brought up, which only looked down on other compatriots. In just a few years, this "development split" would undo all colonial investments and development efforts in the now independent Nigeria.

=== End of British colonial rule ===
On October 1, 1960, Nigeria was granted independence by an act of the British Parliament and admitted to the United Nations. The pros and cons of colonial rule have remained long debated since independence.

== Independence, First Republic (1960/1963–1966) ==
Flag of independent Nigeria

On 1 October 1960, Nigeria gained full independence from the United Kingdom on the basis of a federal constitution, with three large states having a weak central government over them. NCNC Chairman Nnamdi Azikiwe replaced the colonial Governor-General James Wilson Robertson in November 1960 and Elizabeth II remained head of state for the time being.

The NPC and NCNC remained the governing parties, with the AG now in opposition. In this AG, the Yoruba party, there was a bitter power struggle between Obafemi Awolowo, who advocated a socialist course and sought to close ranks with the Soviet Union, and the conservative Prime Minister of the South-West, Samuel Akíntọ́lá, who wanted to improve co-operation with the Northern Party (NPC). This internal party dispute became so heated that the central government under Balewa had to impose a state of emergency on the south-west in May 1962. Akíntọ́lá eventually founded a new party, the NNDP, which would win the disputed 1964 elections in an electoral alliance with the NPC. From then on, Akíntọ́lá was seen in his region as a vicarious agent of the backward and feudal north, which would cost him his life in 1966.

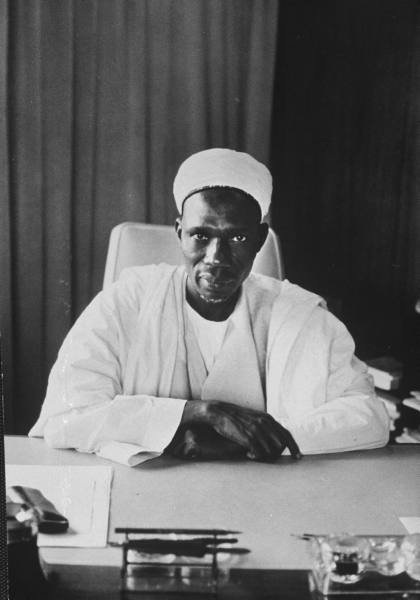
Abubakar Tafawa Balewa

On 1 June 1961, Nigeria received the "North Cameroons", a Muslim-dominated strip of land on the border with Cameroon, following a referendum. The predominantly Christian inhabitants of the South Cameroons (bordering Biafra) decided against the Muslim-dominated and unstable Nigeria and in favour of belonging to Christian-dominated Cameroon. Both "Cameroons" were previously under UN administration; the Bakassi peninsula remained disputed.

Nigeria received a new constitution in 1963. Nigeria became a republic. The British system of government was retained. Abubakar Tafawa Balewa remained Prime Minister and British Queen's Governor Nnamdi Azikiwe became president.

In 1964, a new House of Representatives was elected. The NPC and NNDP electoral alliance won 198 of the 312 seats The Yoruba and Igbo (who generated the lion's share of tax revenue) now sat in opposition, while the Hausa/Fulani dominated politics and the lower ranks of the army up to the sergeant major ranks. Their northern state was larger than would have been suggested by the border between the three main ethnic groups or between the predominant denominations of Islam and Christianity. The Northern Region therefore included not only Muslim Hausa and Fulbe (for whom it was politically in favour, but who made up barely more than a quarter of the population), but also considerable minorities of Christians, followers of natural religions, Yoruba, Igbo and other minorities such as the Tiv. When the politically and militarily dominant Northern Region, which was chronically short of funds, wanted to impose a special tax, the Jizya, on the predominantly Christian Tiv in the same year, riots broke out in the affected region. 4,000 people were killed. One had to wonder how many lives would be lost if, for example, the much more numerous Igbo were to rise up and it was not about a special tax, but about the lucrative oil business in Igboland.

In the south-west, the unrest worsened in 1965 because the election results had apparently been falsified or were the result of intimidation and the government had halved the state-guaranteed producer prices for cocoa immediately after the election. There was arson and looting. Dozens of political opponents were tracked down in places like Ekiti or Ijebu-Ode (both not far from Lagos), doused with petrol and set on fire ("Operation Wetie"). Thugs controlled the streets. By the end of 1965, the south-west was in a state of complete anarchy.

On 1 May 1965, Sir Christopher Welby-Everard, the Chief of the General Staff of Nigeria and the last British officer from colonial times, retired. He was succeeded by Johnson Agulyi-Ironsi, an experienced officer, former military attaché in London and commander of the UN protection force in the Congo in 1964.

== Dictatorship and War ==
=== The January Coup, dictatorship Agulyi-Ironsi (1966) ===
On 15 January 1966, six majors led by Patrick C. Nzeogwu (an intelligence officer), including five Igbo. The officers had received their commission in the UK in 1959–61 with honours at Sandhurst and Aldershot and recognised, not without some justification, the mismanagement and anarchy of the country they were returning to. The conspirators assassinated, among others, Head of Government Balewa and the Prime Ministers of the North and West, Ahmadu Bello and Akíntọ́lá. That the coup plotters also murdered the wives, secretaries and drivers of their originally intended victims at the same time casts a telling light on the perpetrators. Three of the conspirators, Nzeogwu, Ifeajuna and Onwuatuegwu, also found enough time in the hectic hours of their attempted coup to locate and kill their superiors, Colonel Shodeinde, Brigadier General Maimalari and Brigadier General Ademulegun respectively, suggesting private revenge. Non-commissioned officer Daramola Oyegoke, who protested against this, was also murdered. Among the conspirators was Don Okafor, who, as commander of the head of government's guard force, was personally responsible for his protection and was on ‘first name terms’ with him; his part in the murder of Balewa, whose body was left by the roadside, shows a particular perfidy. Among the 22 victims was only one Igbo.

Following the violent death of Prime Minister Balewa, Parliamentary President Orizu, an Igbo, transferred government power to the army chief Agulyi-Ironsi, also an Igbo. With his first decree, he abolished the constitution and freedom of the press and dissolved parliament. Remaining ministers were forced to resign, and from then on, the head of state ruled by means of directives issued by his staff. Ironsi abolished the three federal states and made Nigeria a unitary state for the first time: a country in which all laws, all taxes etc. applied equally everywhere, without regional variations. Nigeria was to be forced to progress by directive, so to speak. This was inevitably viewed badly in the backward north. In addition, the military government was reluctant to take action against Igbo involved in the coup. Ironsi was Igbo himself and used the more highly educated Igbo in the north to implement the supposedly progressive decisions of the central government on the ground. For other ethnic groups, it must have seemed as if the Igbo wanted to take over the country.

=== Another coup, dictatorship Gowon, Biafra (1966–1975) ===
The previously murdered Ahmadu Bello was not only the Prime Minister of the northern state, but also a descendant of the Islamic prophet Muhammad and of the ‘black Napoleon’ dan Fodio, as well as Sardauna (crown prince) of the Sokoto Caliphate, a dynastic and religious title. For Muslims in the north, the complete clarification and rigorous atonement of the highly outrageous act was absolutely non-negotiable. From their point of view, the monstrosity of Bello's murder authorised a hitherto unknown level of revenge and violence. Ironsi, however, did not distance himself from Bello's killers (some of whom were from his personal work environment) and allowed investigations into them to fizzle out. Ironsi's omission was to cost him dearly.

On 29 July 1966, soldiers staged a coup in Abeokuta in the south-west and captured Agulyi-Ironsi, who was visiting nearby Ibadan. When he refused to answer questions from lower-ranking officers about his role in Bello's murder, he was taken to a forest near Lalupon by Major Danjuma's subordinates and shot. Theophilus Danjuma's co-conspirators included Murtala Muhammed, Bukar Dimka, Shehu Yar'Adua, Muhammadu Buhari, Ibrahim Babangida and Sani Abacha, a list of future dictators of Nigeria (and those who wanted to become such) - at that time still mostly 1st and 2nd class lieutenants. Pogroms against the Igbo broke out across the country, with sources claiming 30,000 victims, mostly children. In this situation, the coup plotters appointed Lieutenant Colonel Yakubu ("Jack") Gowon as the new military and state leader and reintroduced federalism. Gowon did not belong to any of the three predominant ethnic groups and was confronted with the task of keeping the three divergent parts of his country and ethnic groups together and putting an end to the pogroms. Under these circumstances, it seemed unlikely that Yakubu Gowon's rule would last comparatively long - nine years. However, one of the worst humanitarian disasters of modern times occurred during this period: the Biafra War.

In September 1966, the pogroms against the Igbo reached their peak. An estimated 1 million Igbo fled from all over the country to the south-east, where they believed they were safe.

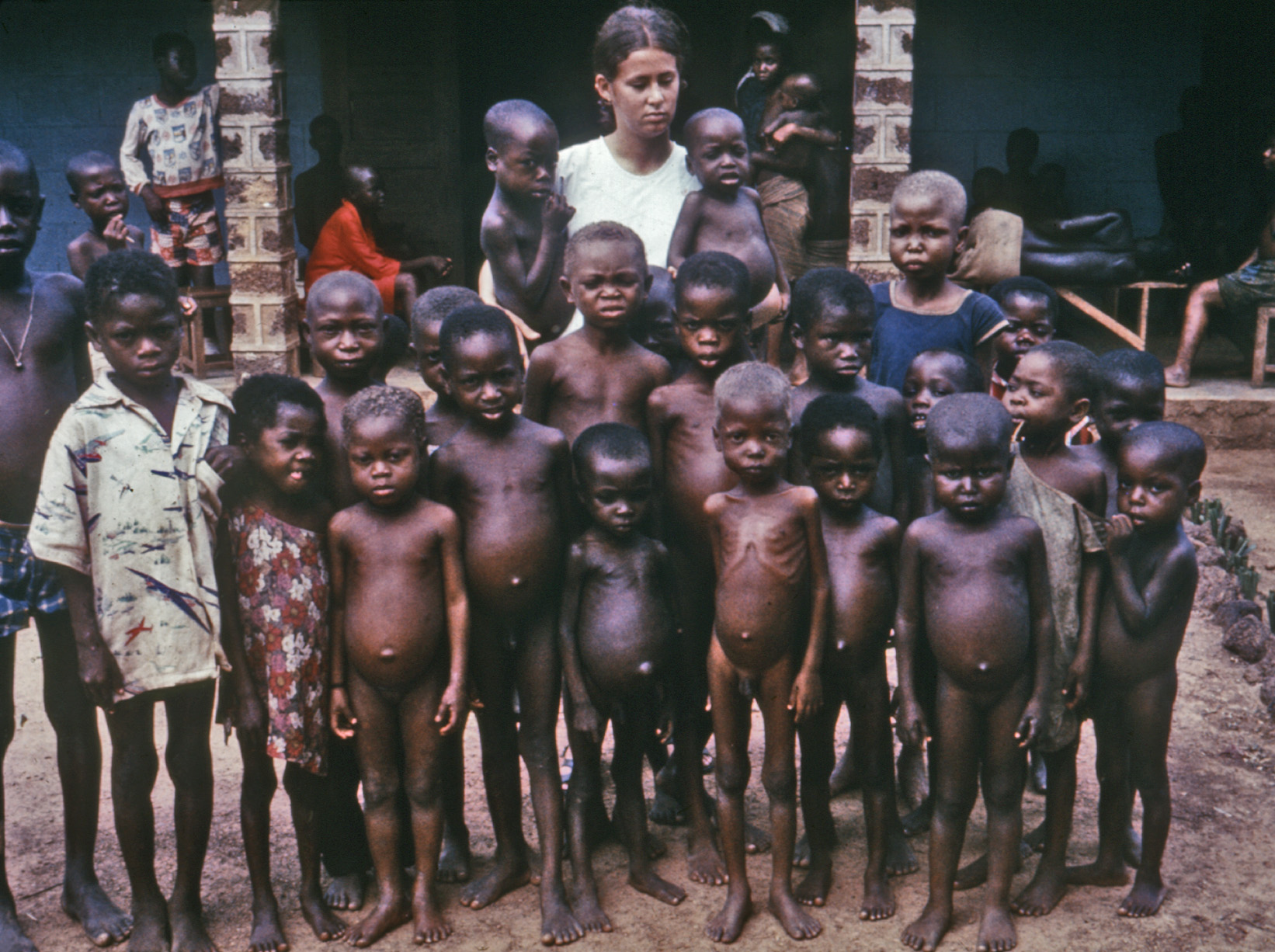
Children with hunger oedema during the Biafra war

In May 1967, the governor of the eastern region, Lieutenant Colonel Emeka Ojukwu, proclaimed it an independent state, the "Republic of Biafra." Following this declaration of independence, the remaining Nigerian forces attacked Biafra at Garkem on 6 July 1967. Nigeria was ill-prepared for this situation due to the liquidation of leading officers during the previous coups. As a result, the Biafran forces were able to advance westwards to Benin City in August 1967. Biafra was besieged and cut off from trade without either side being able to make decisive military movements. It was not until December 1969 that Colonel Obasanjo advanced to Umuahia with 30,000 troops, splitting Biafra in two. This decided the war. The hostilities finally ended after 30 months in January 1970.

The Biafra region, which had already had to cope with an unprecedented wave of refugees, was no longer able to feed its inhabitants due to the trade blockade. Estimates of the number of deaths caused by hunger and acts of war during the civil war range from one to three million. Photographs of starving children in Biafra went around the world and characterised the image of post-colonial Africa.

In addition to acts of war and hunger, genocides against unarmed civilians claimed numerous victims. These include, for example, the massacre of Asaba. When Nigerian troops conquered the Igbo-majority town in the Midwest in October 1967, the citizens were ordered to attend an ordered celebration in the town's central square. The 4,000 unarmed civilians who were gullible enough to comply were separated by gender; the men were murdered on the spot in front of the women and children.

John Martin, caterer on a mail steamer and British citizen, remembers terrible events in September 1967: "Arriving in Lagos and before the ship could ‘clear’, the army came on board and assembled all the Africans on board, passengers and crew in the Dining Saloon. They started to segregate them with an officer identifying nationality and Nigerian tribal affiliations – even by cheek scarring. Our Master-at-Arms was recruited to help. The Master-at-Arms was a Nigerian who travelled between Lagos and Freetown and return, overseeing the deck passengers who we picked up along the coast from Freetown – and those travelling back from Lagos. In effect he was the security officer ensuring these passengers had bonafide tickets and they didn't stray into other passenger areas of the ship. (...) Despite the efforts of Captain Hutchinson insisting the crew were under his protection, claiming the authority of the British Flag, those identified as Igbo's, the last being the Master-at-Arms himself, were taken off the ship under armed escort. The last we saw of them was being taken round back of the sheds. Gunfire was heard. Bodies were seen floating in the lagoon on an outgoing tide."

The federal government was only able to defeat the insurgents in Biafra with great difficulty. The fact that they succeeded in the end was mainly due to the officers Murtala Muhammed and Olusegun Obasanjo, who themselves became dictators a few years later after Gowon's overthrow.

Gowon had increased the number of federal states in Nigeria to 12 in 1967. With this strategic move, he blocked the realistic opportunity for both the south-east and the north to establish their own state, won over the minorities (to which he himself belonged and which make up 30% of the Nigerian population) and, by skilfully drawing the borders of the federal states, deprived the Igbo of control over both the oil wells and the seaports. This fundamentally changed the federal character of Nigeria, but it remained federal.

Nigeria joined OPEC in 1971. It experienced a dynamic economic boom during the 1974 oil crisis, which mainly triggered inflation, and was confronted with declining demand and mass unemployment in 1975. During these years, the north also experienced the worst drought since 1914. Dictator Gowon's 1972 nationalisation decree closed many sectors of the Nigerian economy to all foreign investment and banned foreign participation beyond a minority stake in several other areas. This decree proved detrimental to investment in the Nigerian economy.

On 1 October 1974, in contradiction to earlier statements, Gowon declared that Nigeria was not ready for civilian rule until 1976, and he postponed the handover date indefinitely.

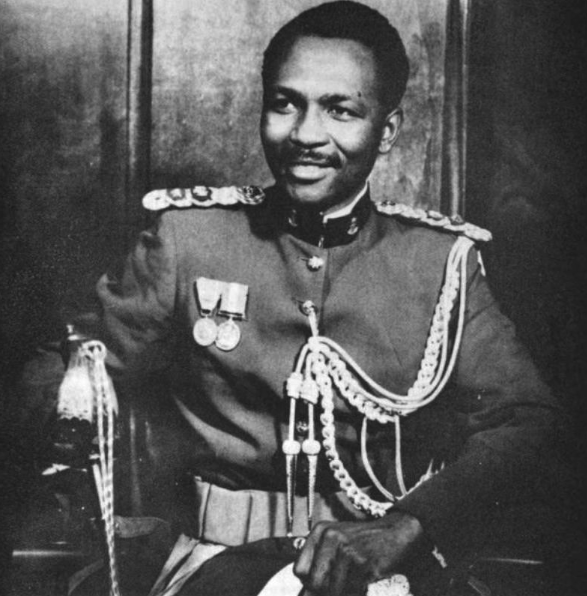
Portrait of General Yakubu Gowon (1966)

Under Gowon, perceived corruption increased, especially among military government officials. Although Gowon himself was never implicated in the corrupt practices, he was often accused of turning a blind eye to the activities of his associates and acquaintances. Newspapers reported on bribery and nepotism. Theft and embezzlement in hospitals and orphanages outraged the Nigerian public. Medicines imported by officials at full price, which had long expired, showed that those involved were also indifferent to human lives.

In addition, the formerly efficient administration became bloated and was overburdened even with simpler tasks. The mismanagement in Gowon's administration culminated in the infamous "cement armada" in the summer of 1975, when the port of Lagos was overcrowded with hundreds of ships trying to unload cement. Representatives of the Nigerian government had signed contracts with 68 different international suppliers to deliver a total of 20 million tonnes of cement to Lagos in one year, even though the port could only take one million tonnes of cargo per year. The poorly drafted cement contracts contained demurrage clauses that were very favourable to the suppliers, so that the bill would skyrocket as the ships waited in port to unload (or even as they waited in their home ports for permission to leave for Nigeria). The Nigerian government only realised the extent of its mistake when the port of Lagos became so congested that basic supplies could no longer be guaranteed. Their attempts to cancel the cement contracts and impose an emergency embargo on all incoming ships kept the country busy with litigation around the world for many years, including a 1983 U.S. Supreme Court decision.

Due to the turmoil of the Second World War and Nigeria's looming independence, the infrastructure, e.g. the railway network, was no longer expanded and was no longer maintained after the outbreak of the Biafra War in 1966. Nigeria's railway system became increasingly dilapidated (this also applies to the railway networks of other West African countries after their independence). As a result, by the 1990s, Nigeria's railway system had deteriorated to the point where it was almost completely non-functional. Large sections of track were missing or unusable, locomotives and rolling stock were in an advanced state of disrepair, and the system could no longer provide reliable service. Expertise was lost, training institutions no longer received funding and ceased operations. (It was not until 2009 that Nigeria began to renovate and lay new tracks again for billions of euros with Chinese aid (see Nigerian Railway Corporation), but the country will still be operating barely more than the colonial line length in 2023).

Scandals and the obvious mismanagement caused dissatisfaction within the army. On 29 July 1975, when Gowon attended an OAU summit in Kampala, a group of officers led by Colonel Joe Nanven Garba announced his overthrow.

=== Dictatorship Murtala Muhammed (1975–1976) ===
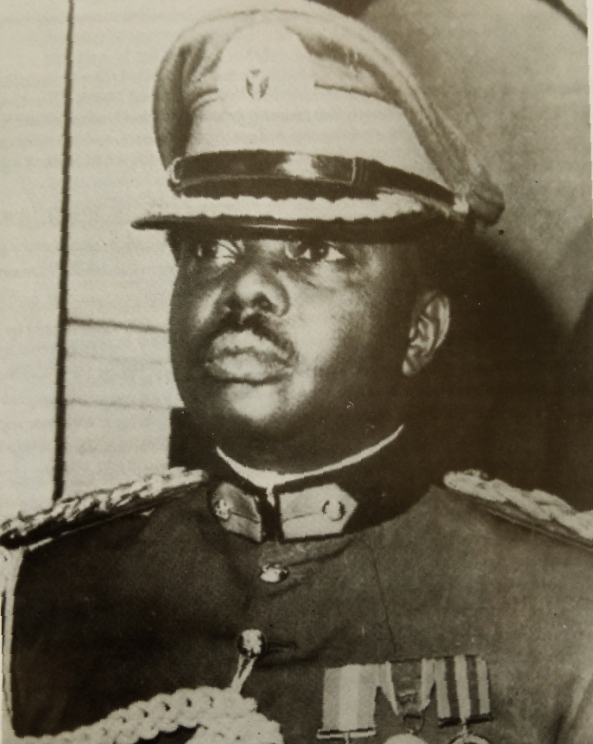
Murtala Mohammed

On 29 July 1975, General Yakubu Gowon was overthrown while attending the 12th summit of the Organisation of African Unity (OAU) in Kampala, Uganda.

Murtala Muhammed assumed power as the new military head of state. He was considered brilliant and bold, but also unpredictable and impetuous.

Murtala Muhammed also took control of the two largest newspapers in the country - Daily Times and New Nigerian; all media in Nigeria were now under state control. He also took control of the remaining state universities.

In a short time, Murtala Muhammed's policies gained wide popular support and his determination made him a popular hero. However, his highly popular but impulsive style of governance and often televised speeches with the frequent addition of "with immediate effect" also earned him criticism among the country's top officials. His ad hoc declarations often left his officials unprepared, lacking details and lacking the financial resources to implement his ideas.

Shortly after taking power, Muhammed realised that state revenues were falling due to low oil production. Global demand for oil had collapsed, spare parts had become more expensive and labour costs had risen. As a result, the military government lacked the funds to fulfil the Nigerian development plan for 1975.

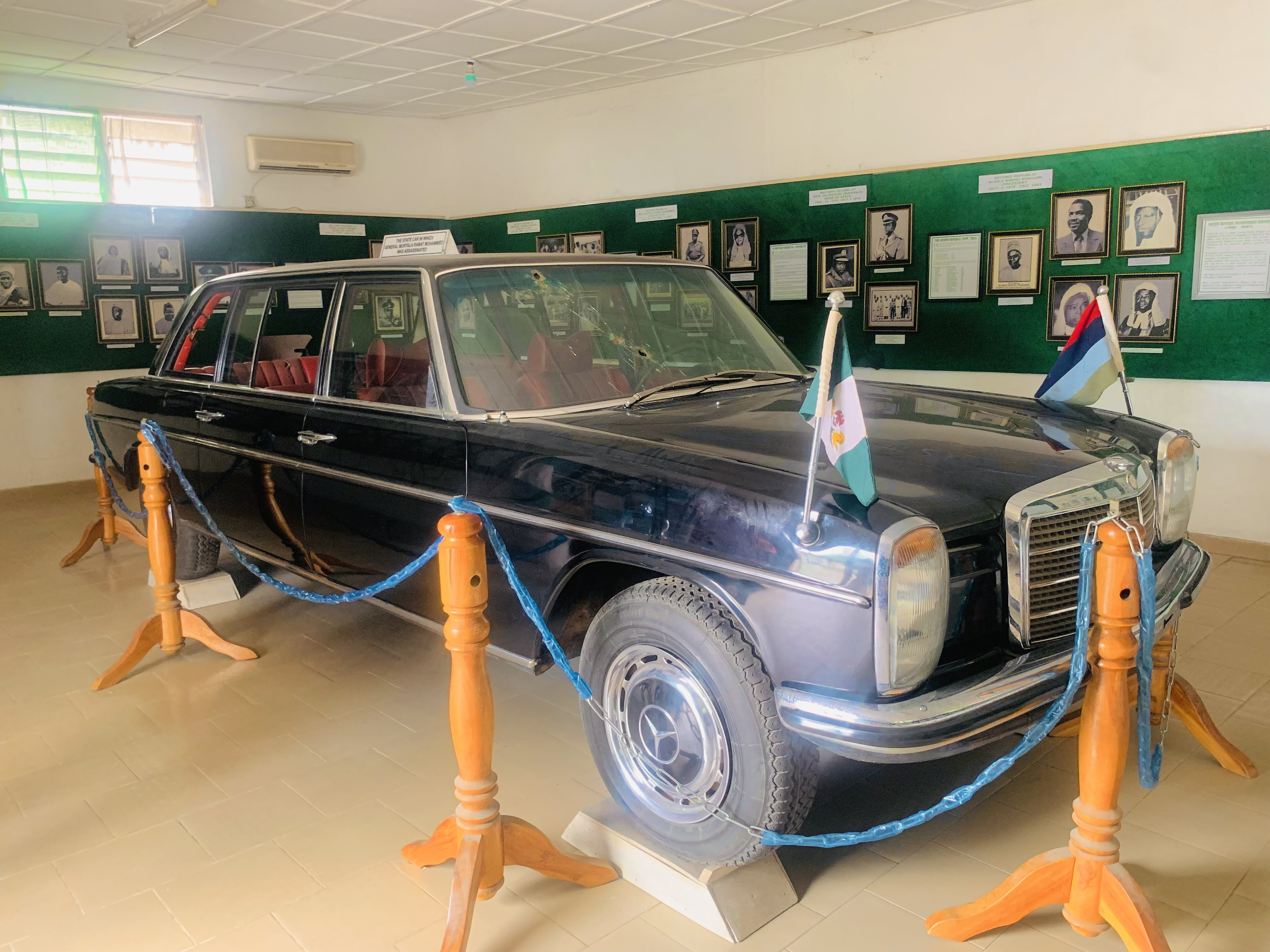
Car in which Murtala Muhammed was murdered in 1976

Murtala Muhammed then carried out a dramatic downsizing of the bloated and inefficient civil service ("Operation Deadwood"). More than 10,000 government employees were dismissed without transitional benefits. Numerous civil servants were tried for corruption and a military governor was executed for gross abuse of office However, due to the drastic nature of the purge, accusations were made that personal scores were also settled in the process of streamlining the civil service.

On 13 February 1976, Muhammed was driving to work in his unarmoured Mercedes-Benz 230.6, unaccompanied by bodyguards or the like. Shortly after 8 a.m., his car was driving slowly through the notorious Lagos traffic when a group of soldiers emerged from a neighbouring petrol station, ambushed the vehicle and murdered the unarmed Muhammed. This was part of an attempted coup d'état by Lieutenant Colonel Dimka, who was executed on 15 May 1976 for treason. Muhammed's successor was the Chief of Staff of the Supreme Headquarters, Olusegun Obasanjo, who had escaped assassination through a case of mistaken identity. The Murtala Muhammed International Airport in Lagos is named after the still popular military ruler, who is also referred to as the "Nigerian Kennedy".

=== Dictatorship Obasanjo (1976–1979) ===
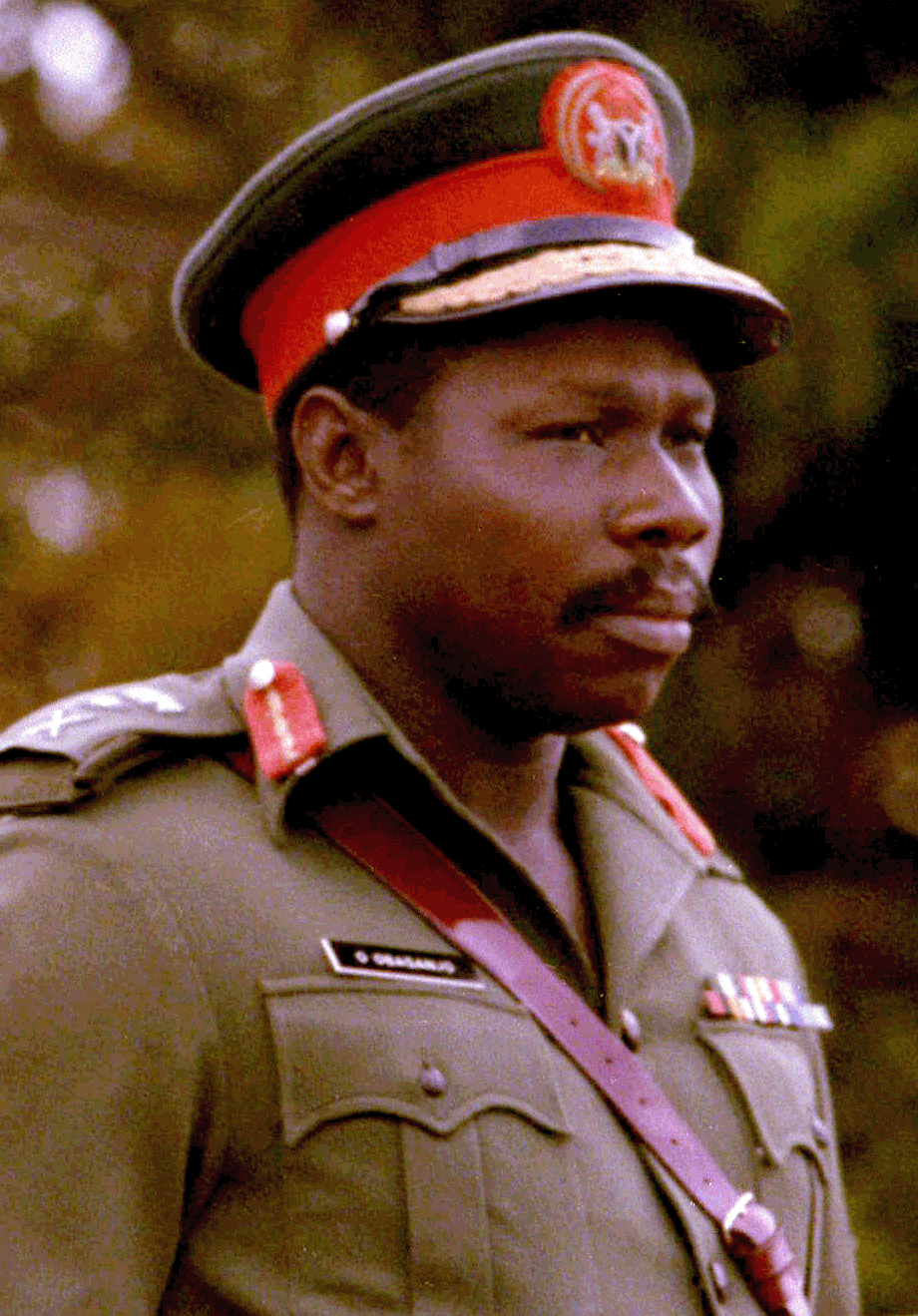
Olusegun Obasanjo 1978

Olusegun Obasanjo formed a triumvirate with two other generals and increased general repression. The most famous example is probably the raid on the home of musician Fela Kuti, during which female family members were raped and his mother was thrown out of a window, suffering fatal injuries. Trade union activities were restricted. Dimka and 37 of his comrades-in-arms were executed.

Obasanjo swiftly convened a committee to draft a new constitution, modelling it on the US system. Even before a result was achieved, Obasanjo increased the number of federal states to 19. The draft of the new constitution was very similar to today's Nigerian constitution and summarised the position of the head of state and the head of government. The powerful position of the president was balanced by two chambers. The constitution was promulgated in September 1978. The five parties that ran their own presidential candidates in the 1979 election showed less vision than the above committee and focussed - as in the First Republic, but against Obasanjo's express wishes - primarily on representing ethnic groups. Despite the past 20 years and a survived civil war, the new party landscape was to a certain extent a copy of the old one:

- The NPN represented the Northern Nigerians and thus took over the legacy of the NPC,
- the NPP represented the South-East (like the NCNC mentioned above, again with Chairman Azikiwe) and
- the UPN represented the South West (like the AG mentioned above, again with Chairman Awolowo).

Accordingly, each party won by over 80 per cent in the state where it represented the majority of the population. The ethnic group that had the largest share of Nigeria's population - still Northern Nigerians - won the election with its party and provided the new president, Alhaji Shehu Shagari. So before it had begun, the Second Republic was already suffering from the same problem as the First Republic: a party landscape that had been formed along ethnic lines rather than ideological or programmatic standpoints.

== The Second Republic (1979–1983), President Shagari ==
On 1 October 1979, Shehu Shagari was sworn in as the first President and Commander-in-Chief of the Federal Republic of Nigeria. As his party, the NPN, had barely more than 35% of the seats in the Senate and the House of Representatives, Shagari formed a coalition with the NPP, which had become the third strongest party in the parliamentary elections. This coalition had a slim majority in both chambers.

Shagari relied on large-scale industry and, in agriculture, on the "Green Revolution" that corresponded to the current state of science at the time: preference for large farms, intensive use of fertilisers and pesticides, use of machinery, drilling of deep groundwater, etc. The Green Revolution is viewed rather critically today (2023).

=== Laying of the foundation stone for the Ajaokuta steelworks ===
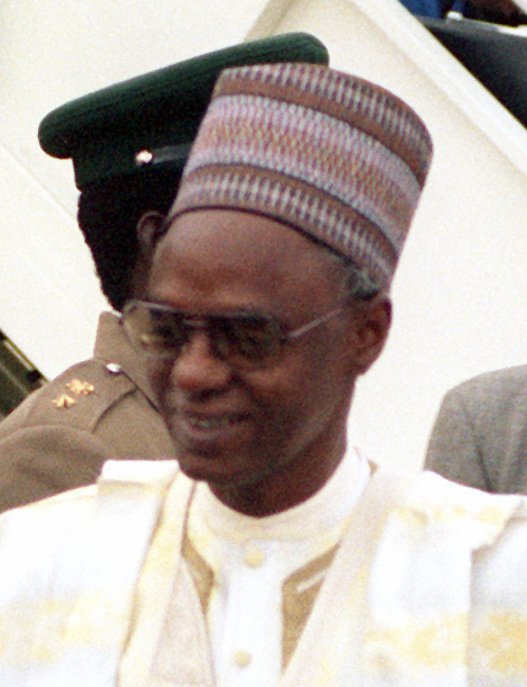
Shehu Shagari, President of the Second Republic

In 1980, Shagari laid the foundation stone for the Ajaokuta steelworks, which was to be built by a Soviet state-owned company near the Niger River and the Itakpe ore mine. By 1991, 98% of the steelworks, which was to be built to Soviet standards, i.e. on a very large scale, had been constructed. However, by 1991 the Soviet Union had dissolved, world demand for steel had changed unfavourably and technology had developed further. The steelworks was not completed and had still not started operations in 1994 - which, according to Russian Wikipedia articles on the subject, was entirely due to Nigeria. Ajaokuta was seen as a prime example of failed development aid in West Africa. However, by 2017, 40 of the 43 plants were gradually able to start operations. In 2023, Ajaokuta Steel produced around one sixth of the amount of steel produced by the UK. Three other Shagari-era steel plants in Jos, Oshogbo and Katsina appear to no longer be active.

=== Construction of social housing ===
Shagari began the construction of 200,000 social housing units across the country, of which 25,000 were completed during his term of office. A 2017 study by Nnamdi Azikiwe University in Awka criticised the lack of planning (the completed flats were not connected to water, electricity, sewerage or transport or were located in an area with no demand for new flats). The new flats were often never occupied, were not managed and soon fell into disrepair. Shagari's successors did not pursue the completion of the remaining flats, which also fell into disrepair.

=== Deportation of West African immigrants ===
In January 1983, Shagari decided to deport West African immigrants under the slogan "Ghana must go!" in the face of an economic slump. An estimated 2 million Ghanaians had to leave the country suddenly and with malice, leaving most of their belongings behind. Provisional bags and suitcases became the symbol of the forced exodus (they are still called "Ghana bags" today). It is not without a certain irony that social and economic development in Ghana after 1983 was to be much more favourable than in Nigeria and that Nigerians, for their part, would look for work and income in Ghana.

=== Economic isolationism ===
Shagari reacted to falling oil prices and the resulting economic downturn by restricting import licences and increasing customs duties. He rejected cooperation with the International Monetary Fund[165].

=== Education, women's emancipation, environmental issues ===
Under Shagari, the education system in Nigeria improved. For example, a number of universities were founded. He also promoted the inclusion of women in political life. He filled many offices with women.

=== Re-election ===
Similar to the First Republic, the Northern Party won an absolute majority in parliament after a few years in government and no longer needed coalition partners.

=== Shagari's fight against corruption, General Buhari ===
Although Shehu Shagari is cleared of personal involvement in corrupt practices, the Second Republic was plagued by allegations of corruption, including allegations of electoral fraud in the 1983 elections. In his second term, Shagari made attempts to curb corruption through the new Ministry of National Guidance under Yusuf Maitama Sule, which was created solely for this purpose. A new programme called Ethical Revolution was introduced, one of whose initiatives was the famous "war against indiscipline" launched under General Muhammadu Buhari. The ministry was only in office for three months before a coup d'état in 1983 made Buhari the sole ruler.

== Buhari (1983–1985) and Babangida (1985–1992), two unequal dictators ==
The military coup on 31 December 1983 was coordinated by leading officers of the Nigerian military and led to the overthrow of the government and the installation of Major General Muhammadu Buhari as head of state. The inauguration of Muhammadu Buhari was generally seen as a positive development Buhari promised reforms, but his government performed little better than that of his predecessor. General Buhari was overthrown in 1985 by a military coup led by General Ibrahim Babangida. Buhari would be elected president 30 years later, in the Fourth Republic and now democratically purged.

Babangida was more far-sighted than Nigeria's previous military leaders, loosening state control over the press and releasing a number of prisoners. However, he faced the same economic problems that Buhari had faced and the same discontent in the country.

Babangida soon gained a reputation as a clever politician. He asked the Nigerian people whether their country should accept a financial aid package worth billions from the International Monetary Fund (IMF). When, as he had expected, the Nigerian people refused to accept the package, Babangida suspended talks with the IMF. He then offered Nigerians his own economic recovery programme - which included many of the harsh measures proposed by the IMF - and convinced Nigerians to accept it. As a result of this programme, Nigeria received loans from banks and gained economic credibility in Western countries.

According to Forbes, shortly before the Second Gulf War, Babangida diverted twelve billion US dollars in unplanned income ("oil windfall") into his own pocket (the oil price jumped from 15 to US$41.15/barrel within weeks in 1990 and then plummeted to the old value). However, these funds could never be found. Nevertheless, the additional profit of US$12 billion calculated by Forbes could only have been realised if Nigeria had sold the entire annual production volume of 630 million barrels on the world market exactly on 27 September 1990 at the annual high price of US$41/barrel - 19 more than the officially stated annual average of US$22/barrel (630 million barrels × US$19/barrel = US$11.97 billion). This is unlikely given the sluggishness of the state oil company NNPC and the lack of ex post information for those involved. Babangida commented in 2022 on the above allegations that he and his associates were "saints." This account should be evaluated as cautiously as Forbes' calculation.

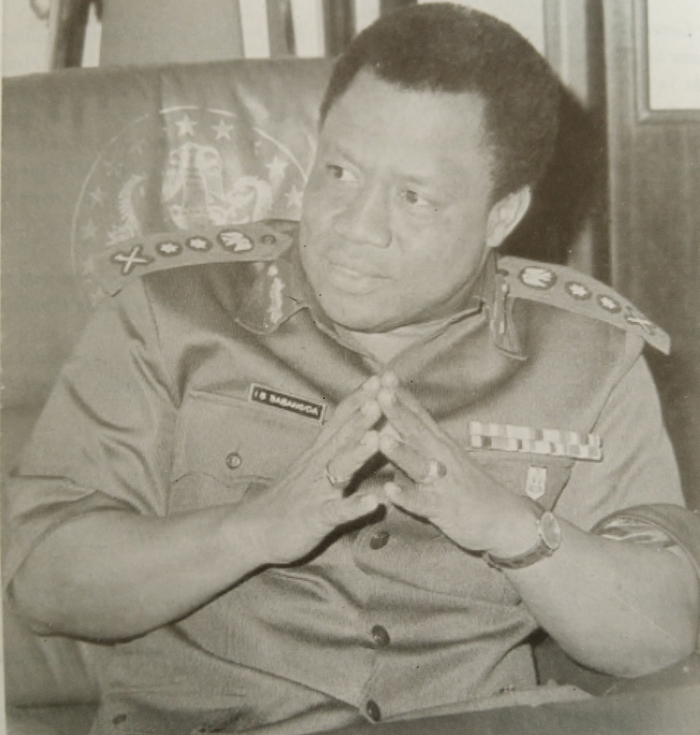
Ibrahim Babangida

In December 1991, the centrally located Abuja became the capital.

The Babangida regime ensured the establishment of a state security apparatus; it survived two coup attempts. General Mamman Vatsa and Major Gideon Orkar were executed, and the critical journalist Dele Giwa was murdered. In 1989, Babangida promised the transition to the Third Nigerian Republic. Babangida survived the 1990 coup attempt and postponed the promised return to democracy until 1992.

Babangida's intelligence cannot be denied and his foreign and economic policies benefited Nigeria. The security apparatus and secret service he set up may be understandable in view of the fate of military ruler Murtala Mohammed - who was shot unarmed and without bodyguards in an unarmoured limousine in 1976 - but it went beyond the vital protection of the president and did not shy away from political murder. Babangida thus created the instruments with which his successor Abacha led Nigeria into its darkest epoch after the civil war.

== The Abortive Third Republic ==
Head of State Babangida promised to return the country to civilian rule by 1990 which was later extended until January 1993. In early 1989, a constituent assembly completed a constitution and in the spring of 1989 political activity was again permitted. In October 1989, the government established two parties, the National Republican Convention (NRC) and the Social Democratic Party (SDP); other parties were not allowed to register.

In April 1990, mid-level officers attempted unsuccessfully to overthrow the government and 69 accused plotters were executed after secret trials before military tribunals. In December 1990, the first stage of partisan elections was held at the local government level. Despite the low turnout, there was no violence and both parties demonstrated strength in all regions of the country, with the SDP winning control of a majority of local government councils.

In December 1991, state legislative elections were held and Babangida decreed that previously banned politicians could contest in primaries scheduled for August. These were cancelled due to fraud and subsequent primaries scheduled for September also were cancelled. All announced candidates were disqualified from standing for president once a new election format was selected. The presidential election was finally held on 12 June 1993, with the inauguration of the new president scheduled to take place 27 August 1993, the eighth anniversary of President Babangida's coming to power.

In the historic 12 June 1993 presidential elections, which most observers deemed to be Nigeria's fairest, early returns indicated that wealthy Yoruba businessman M. K. O. Abiola won a decisive victory. However, on 23 June, Babangida, using several pending lawsuits as a pretence, annulled the election, throwing Nigeria into turmoil. More than 100 were killed in riots before Babangida agreed to hand power to an interim government on 26 August 1993. He later attempted to renege on this decision, but without popular and military support, he was forced to hand over to Ernest Shonekan, a prominent nonpartisan businessman. Shonekan was to rule until elections scheduled for February 1994. Although he had led Babangida's Transitional Council since 1993, Shonekan was unable to reverse Nigeria's economic problems or to defuse lingering political tension.

== Dictatorship Abacha (1993–1998) ==
Shonekan's transitional government, the shortest in the country's political history, was overthrown in 1993 by a coup d'état led by General Sani Abacha. This was the seventh Nigerian coup d'état in less than 30 years and also (as of 2026) the last military coup in the country.

=== Absolute power, reign of terror ===
Unlike previous military dictators in Nigeria such as Gowon, Murtala, Obasanjo or Buhari, Abacha can only be described as a reign of terror.

After dissolving the government and parliament in November 1993, he also made himself chief justice in September 1994 and thus gained absolute power. Abacha put together a personal security force of 3,000 men trained in North Korea. Nigerian police forces were retrained on a large scale. The state ruthlessly cracked down on perceived political opponents.

In 1995, the writer and civil rights activist Ken Saro-Wiwa and eight other defendants (the Ogoni Nine) were executed in Port Harcourt after a spectacular show trial that sparked violent international protests. Nigeria was expelled from the Commonwealth of Nations with immediate effect. The winner of the 1993 presidential election, Moshood Abiola, was arrested and died in unexplained circumstances, in any case due to lack of medical care after four years in prison. Former army chief of staff Shehu Musa Yar'Adua was also arrested - he also died in prison. Former military ruler Olusegun Obasanjo was also arrested for treason and accused of planning a coup d'état together with General Oladipo Diya. The Nobel Prize winner Wole Soyinka was charged in absentia with high treason. Even the fatal plane crash of Sani Abacha's eldest son Ibrahim on 17 January 1996 and the subsequent assassinations of relatives of the 14 other accident victims were allegedly carried out on the dictator's orders; these rumours were strengthened by the fact that Abacha did not release the 15 bodies.

=== Descent into a narco-state ===
During his five years in office, Abacha's lack of co-operation in anti-narcotics operations led to the repeated revocation of US certification to combat drugs under Section 481 of the Foreign Assistance Act (FAA). This officially made Nigeria a narco-state. The US voted against Nigeria in six multilateral development banks and refused to provide any assistance to Nigeria under the FAA and the Arms Control Export Act. Direct flights from the US to Nigeria remained banned due to security concerns.

=== Embezzlement of state funds, the "Abacha loot" ===
Under Abacha, the misappropriation of public funds reached epic proportions and is known as the "Abacha loot." Abacha's National Security Adviser, Alhaji Ismaila Gwarzo, submitted fake funding requests for national security, which Abacha approved. The funds were usually sent in cash or travellers cheques from the Central Bank of Nigeria to Gwarzo, who brought them to Abacha's house. An estimated $1.4 billion in cash was handed over in this way.

In a list of the ten most self-enriching heads of state, Abacha and his family rank fourth. They are alleged to have embezzled between 1 and 5 billion dollars.

On 7 August 2014, the US Department of Justice announced that $480 million had been seized from the Nigerian government, the largest amount in the country's history. Jersey's Civil Asset Recovery Fund discovered more than $267 million in funds allegedly laundered through the US banking system and deposited into an account in Jersey (£210 million). The US Department of Justice, the Jersey courts and the Nigerian government made a civil forfeiture of the funds, which will be divided between these countries.

=== End of petrol production for 28 years ===
Due to poor maintenance, incompetent management and the exodus of skilled labour, the last of Nigeria's four (state-owned) oil refineries ended its production of petrol in 1996. By September 2024 (when the privately owned Dangote refinery began operations), the country had to import 100% of its refined fuels in exchange for hard currency despite its vast oil reserves, not counting the production of a few thousand very small and extremely dirty illegal refineries in the Niger Delta.

== Democratisation and federalism in 1998 ==
Abacha died of heart failure on 8 June 1998 and was replaced by General Abdulsalami Abubakar. The military Provisional Ruling Council (PRC) under Abubakar commuted the sentences of those accused in the alleged coup during the Abacha regime and released almost all known civilian political detainees. Pending the promulgation of the constitution written in 1995, the government observed some provisions of the 1979 and 1989 constitutions. Neither Abacha nor Abubakar lifted the decree suspending the 1979 constitution, and the 1989 constitution was not implemented. The judiciary system continued to be hampered by corruption and lack of resources after Abacha's death. In an attempt to alleviate such problems Abubakar's government implemented a civil service pay raise and other reforms.

In August 1998, Abubakar appointed the Independent National Electoral Commission (INEC) to conduct elections for local government councils, state legislatures and governors, the national assembly, and president. The NEC successfully held elections on 5 December 1998, 9 January 1999, 20 February, and 27 February 1999, respectively. For local elections, nine parties were granted provisional registration with three fulfilling the requirements to contest the following elections. These parties were the People's Democratic Party (PDP), the All People's Party (APP), and the predominantly Yoruba Alliance for Democracy (AD). The former military head of state Olusegun Obasanjo, freed from prison by Abubakar, ran as a civilian candidate and won the presidential election. The PRC promulgated a new constitution based largely on the suspended 1979 constitution, before the 29 May 1999 inauguration of the new civilian president. The constitution includes provisions for a bicameral legislature, the National Assembly consisting of a 360-member House of Representatives and a 109-member Senate.

== Fourth Republic ==
=== Presidency Obasanjo (1999–2007) ===
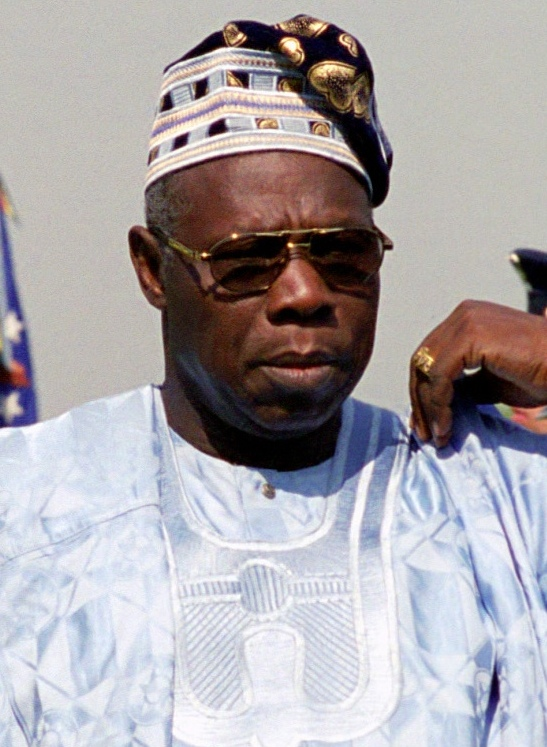
Olusegun Obasanjo 2001

The emergence of democracy in Nigeria in May 1999 ended 39 years of coups, countercoups and short-lived democracies. Olusegun Obasanjo inherited a country suffering economic stagnation and the deterioration of most democratic institutions. Obasanjo had an adventurous life that also reflected the first 40 years of independent Nigeria: During the civil war, he was a colonel and organised the decisive strike against the Republic of Biafra, as Chief of Staff he escaped an attempt on his life through mistaken identity and was subsequently, between 1977 and 1979, military ruler (without having aspired to this), led Nigeria back to democracy, served time in prison under Abacha and during this time awaited his execution for alleged high treason.

==== First term in office ====
===== Securing power =====
In the first months of his presidency, Obasanjo retired some 200 military officers, including all 93 who held political office, making a coup by senior officers less likely. He also moved the Ministry of Defence from Lagos to Abuja and ensured that it was placed under more direct government control.

===== Active foreign policy =====
The IV. Republic was able to repair the damage caused by the Abacha dictatorship through an active foreign policy. In October 2001, Nigerian President Olusegun Obasanjo, South African President Thabo Mbeki and Algerian President Abd al-Aziz Bouteflika established the New Partnership for Africa's Development, or NEPAD, which aims to strengthen Africa's growth, development and participation in the global economy. During Obasanjo's first term in office, Nigerians' freedoms increased; freedom of the press allowed for the first time to criticise the president again.

===== Communal violence =====
Communal violence has plagued the Obasanjo government since its inception. In May 1999, violence erupted in Kaduna State over the succession of an Emir resulting in more than 100 deaths. In November 1999, the army destroyed the town of Odi, Bayelsa State and killed scores of civilians in retaliation for the murder of 12 policemen by a local gang. In Kaduna in February–May 2000, over 1,000 people died in rioting over the introduction of criminal Shar'ia in the State. Hundreds of ethnic Hausa were killed in reprisal attacks in south-eastern Nigeria. In September 2001, over 2,000 people were killed in inter-religious rioting in Jos. In October 2001, hundreds were killed, and thousands displaced in communal violence that spread across the states of Benue, Taraba, and Nasarawa. On 1 October 2001, Obasanjo announced the formation of a National Security Commission to address the issue of communal violence. Obasanjo was reelected in 2003.

==== Second term in office ====
Obasanjo was re-elected in 2003 in a tumultuous election with violent ethnic and religious undertones.

In his second term, Obasanjo ensured the expansion of the Nigerian police force.

In October 2005, the Obasanjo government repaid all its debts (in exchange for a reduction) under the Paris Club.

===== Dispute over the Bakassi Peninsula =====
Obasanjo was also faced with resolving an ongoing border dispute with neighbouring Cameroon over the ownership of the Bakassi Peninsula, an oil-rich area with close cultural ties to both countries. According to a 2002 ruling by the International Court of Justice, the region was recognised as belonging to Cameroon. Despite domestic protests, Obasanjo followed the court's decision in 2006, renounced his claims to the peninsula and withdrew his troops.

On 12 June 2006, Obasanjo signed the Greentree Agreement with Cameroonian President Paul Biya, which formally ended the border dispute over the Bakassi Peninsula. Even when the Nigerian Senate passed a resolution declaring the withdrawal of Nigerian troops from the Bakassi Peninsula illegal, Obasanjo gave the order to proceed with it as planned. On 14 August 2008, the peninsula was fully handed over to Cameroon.

===== Conflict in the Niger Delta =====
Demonstrations against the government's oil policy and high petrol prices had been on the agenda in Nigeria for some time. The inhabitants of the Niger Delta also protested against the activities of the oil companies in their area, which they felt were exploiting the country and giving back too little of their profits. The protests turned into coordinated militant actions in 2006: Oil company employees were kidnapped and refineries and pipelines were damaged. Rebels tried to disrupt oil production and thus cause economic damage to the companies. The most active of these militant groups was the Movement for the Emancipation of the Niger Delta (MEND). The movement announced a unilateral ceasefire in 2008 and accepted an amnesty programme proposed by the government in 2009.

Ethnic violence over control of the oil-producing Niger Delta region and an insurgency in the north-east continued. Conflicts between Muslims and Christians in Plateau state prompted Obasanjo to declare a state of emergency in May 2004, suspend the state government and install a six-month military government. Obasanjo was able to largely repair the diplomatic damage caused by the Abacha dictatorship through an active foreign policy (for example, by rejoining the Commonwealth).

==== Plans for a third term in office ====
Obasanjo tried to amend the constitution to allow him a third term in office - a process that often heralds the transition to another dictatorship in other African countries in the region. This led to tensions with the parliament and with Vice President Atiku Abubakar. An autobiography by Condoleezza Rice claims that the then US President George W. Bush ultimately convinced Obasanjo to abandon these plans. Today (2023), Obasanjo comments on Nigerian politics in an idiosyncratic way.

==== Conclusion ====
Although the elections that brought Obasanjo to power and allowed him to run for a second term were condemned as unfree and unfair, Nigeria made significant progress in democratisation. The fact that the National Assembly was able to successfully deny the president a third term despite his influence on the army and security forces is evidence of the checks and balances in the Nigerian Government after 2000.

The federalist structure of the 1999 constitution with 36 federal states(and one Federal Capital Territory, FCT) of roughly equal size, a Senate with three senators from each state, as well as a blocking minority of at least 13 states in the presidential election must be considered a stroke of luck in view of the numerous ethnic groups and the religious division of the country. Since then, every presidential candidate has emphasised in their own interest that they represent not only their own ethnic group/religion, but all Nigerians. Nigerian parties now differentiate themselves primarily in terms of their programmes and no longer according to ethnic affiliations.

=== Presidency Yar'Adua (2007–2010) ===
As Obasanjo was no longer allowed to run in the 2007 presidential election, Umaru Yar'Adua entered the race as the Muslim candidate for the PDP. Umaru Yar'Adua was the brother of Obasanjo's deputy during his time as military dictator.

Umaru Yar'Adua won with a clear majority and was sworn in as the new president on 29 May 2007. International observers strongly condemned the election, which was marred by irregularities and vote rigging. The international community, which had observed the Nigerian elections to promote a free and fair process, condemned these elections as seriously flawed. Outgoing President Olusegun Obasanjo acknowledged fraud and other "shortcomings" in the elections, but stated that the result was in line with the opinion polls. In a nationally televised address in 2007, he added that if Nigerians did not like the victory of his hand-picked successor, they had the option of voting again in four years' time. However, Yar'Adua's health would soon render this option moot.

In 2009, Yar'Adua's term of office saw the out-of-court settlement of lawsuits under the US Alien Tort Statute against Royal Dutch Shell and Brian Anderson, the head of Shell's Nigerian subsidiary. Shell continues to deny liability.

=== Presidency Jonathan (2010–2015) ===
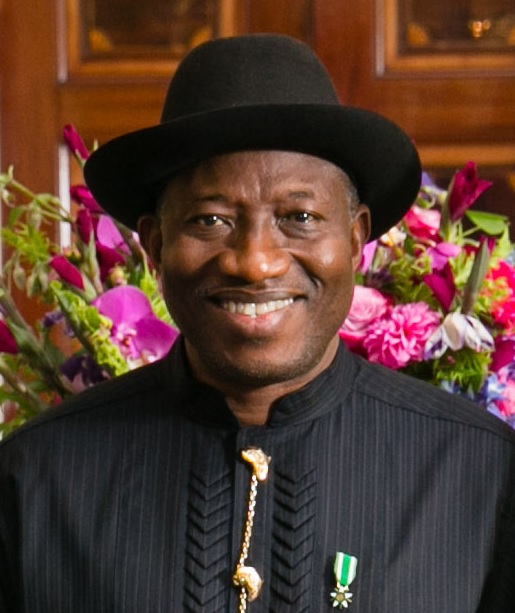
Goodluck Jonathan 2014

Yar'Adua died on 5 May 2010. 3 months earlier, Vice President Goodluck Ebele Jonathan had already been sworn in as the successor to Yar'Adua, who was seriously ill and receiving treatment abroad.

For the remainder of his term in office, his priorities were to solve the country's energy problems and to continue peace negotiations with the rebels in the Niger Delta.

Jonathan emerged victorious from the presidential elections. Second place went to former General and Head of State Muhammadu Buhari, who received 32 per cent of the vote. The international media reported that the elections went smoothly, unlike previous elections.

==== Successes against Ebola and in the entertainment industry ====
Jonathan's time in office saw the successful fight against Ebola and an economic recovery that made Nigeria the leading economic power in Africa. The Jonathan administration's film promotion for high-quality productions created its own commercially successful film industry ("Nollywood"), which can only be compared to the US and India ("Bollywood").

==== Fight against Boko Haram ====
On the debit side of the balance sheet, on the other hand, is the wave of terror by Boko Haram, which kidnapped 200 schoolgirls in Chibok in 2014 and highlighted the impotence of the Nigerian state (around 100 of the girls are still missing in 2022).

Jonathan, who was criticised during the 2014 election campaign for not having done enough to combat Boko Haram, asked the neighbouring countries of Benin, Cameroon, Chad and Niger for support. A regional army was set up with troops from Nigeria and the aforementioned countries and an offensive was launched against the terrorists. The fight against Boko Haram made significant progress, with armed forces recapturing large areas previously held by the terrorist group.

==== Law against queer people ====
The Same Sex Marriage Prohibition Act, signed by Jonathan in 2014, is one of the most repressive laws in the world against LGBT people and those who may be considered by the Nigerian judiciary as their "sponsors". The law is also supported by the general Nigerian population. They even went on to praise him for ensuring that the law had been passed and signed.

==== Embezzlement of state funds, deselection ====
Above all, however, Jonathan's time in office is characterised by embezzlement in office - the misappropriation of state funds. The Nigerian state is said to have lost 20 billion US dollars as a result. The high level of corruption was a decisive factor in the 2015 presidential election, from which opposition candidate Muhammadu Buhari emerged victorious. The elections were originally scheduled for mid-February, but were then postponed by the Nigerian electoral commission by six weeks, as the level of violence emanating from Boko Haram at the time was an obstacle to the elections in the north-east.

Jonathan's ouster is (as of 2023) the only case in the IV Republic in which Nigerian voters refused to re-elect an incumbent president. Jonathan's party, the PDP, lost power after 16 years in power. At least it can be said of Jonathan that he conceded his electoral defeat without complaint.

=== Presidency Buhari (2015–2023) ===
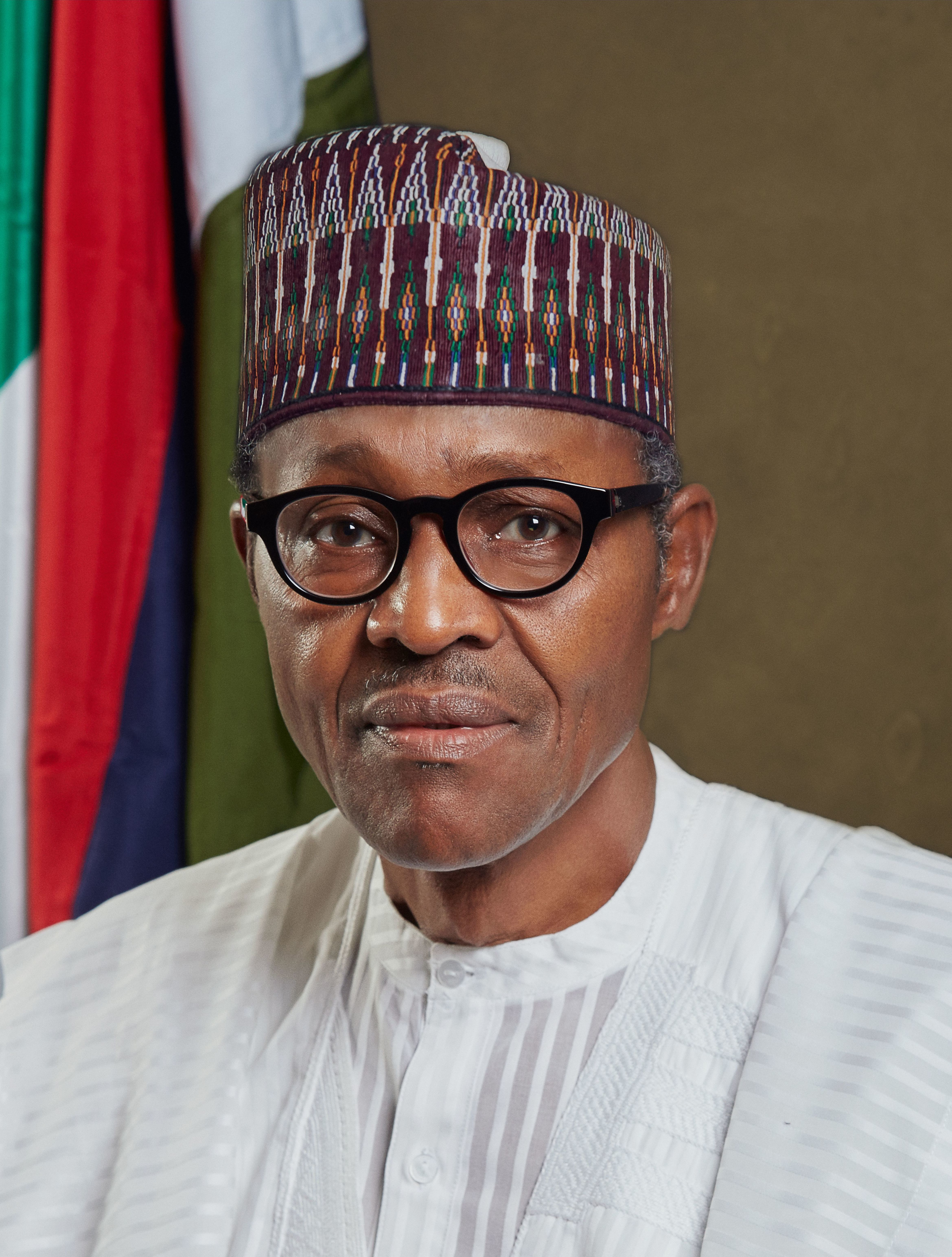
Muhammadu Buhari 2015

Since the Second Republic, Buhari has been seen as the clean man of Nigerian politics, as frugal, but also as a representative of northern interests. His party, the "All Progressives", was only formed shortly before his election in 2015 from a merger of four opposition parties. The election, in which the then 72-year-old Buhari won on his fourth attempt, was described by observers as fair. In 2019, Buhari was elected for a second and final term in office and the Progressives remain the ruling party to this day (November 2024). During Buhari's two terms in office, they were able to gradually increase the number of deputies, senators and governors. The Buhari era (as of January 2023) is characterised by a dynamic structural policy, economic diversification, successes against Boko Haram and a decreasing perception of corruption, but also by a rapid increase in armed crime and police attacks. While the COVID-19 pandemic played no role in the young Nigerian population from 2020, in 2022 Nigeria, as the world's largest wheat importer, was hit particularly hard by the wheat shortage caused by the Russian invasion of Ukraine and the resulting rise in bread prices.

==== Anti-corruption measures ====
One of Buhari's anti-corruption measures promised in the 2015 election was the suspension of the Chief Justice of Nigeria, Walter Onnoghen. Investigations by the Code of Conduct Bureau (CCB, a kind of ethics council) and complaints by a citizens' initiative had revealed that Onnoghen held secret accounts and did not declare incoming income. After Onnoghen failed to appear on two CCB summonses in January 2019, he was suspended by Buhari. Onnoghen avoided impeachment by the Nigerian Senate (similar to the German Federal Council) by resigning. In December 2019, the Attorney General, Mohammed Bello Adoke, was convicted of corruption in absentia and later extradited from neighbouring Niger. In July 2020 - not without irony - the Chairman of the Commission of Inquiry against Corruption EFCC, Ibrahim Magu, was arrested for corruption. In December 2020, he was followed by the Chairman of the Pension Taskforce, Abdulrasheed Maina, and a senator - Since corruption takes place in secret and is an emotionally charged issue, an objective assessment is difficult. However, unlike in the 2015 election, Nigerians no longer see corruption as the most important political issue in the 2022 polls, but place it behind "fighting crime", "economy" and "power supply". This improvement is not reflected in the Corruption Perception Index (CPI) - instead, this assessment of Nigeria by 11 international NGOs has worsened by several points since 2015.

==== Infrastructure policy with Chinese help ====
The Buhari administration has renovated and rebuilt roads, harbours, bridges and railways like no previous government. The construction and profitable operation of the Lagos-Ibadan standard gauge railway since May 2021 as well as the Second Niger Bridge near Onitsha and the Lekki Super Post-Panamax container port, both of which were completed in December 2022, deserve special mention. The Buhari administration has been able to attract or set up processing industries for commodities such as crude oil and rice (e.g. Dangote refinery, Imota rice mill). Major Nigerian entrepreneurs such as Aliko Dangote (cement), Innocent Chukwuma (Innoson, vehicle manufacturing) and Stella Chinyelu Okoli (Emzor Pharma) no longer take their assets abroad, but invest them at home. - Initially, most of the structural improvements were financed and implemented as PPP projects as part of the People's Republic of China's increased involvement in Africa via the state-owned companies CCECC and CHEC, while Western countries hardly participated in such projects. However, when the Nigerian-Chinese negotiations on further projects failed in 2021, Construction Minister Fashola was able to arrange financing for two new rail projects in a short time via the British Standard Chartered Bank. Nigeria is the only sub-Saharan country that operates more kilometres of rail track in 2023 than in colonial times, and one of the few countries in the world that is expanding its rail network every year instead of closing tracks.

==== Successes against Boko Haram ====
Buhari's strategy against Boko Haram was effective despite some setbacks. The terrorist militia was driven out of the most important cities in the afflicted north as early as 2016 (see chapter "Boko Haram"). The situation eased at the beginning of 2022, when Boko Haram, whose militias had terrorised Nigeria's north for years and devastated entire regions, was largely disbanded. 40,000 Boko Haram fighters surrendered. However, the splinter group ISWAP remains active. In addition, Nigeria has been hit by a wave of crime and rampant police violence since 2019.

Despite the political stability, the security situation in Nigeria was considered inadequate. 68% of Nigerians felt "not safe" in their country according to a survey by the NOI-Polls opinion research institute in May 2022. 77% do not know a helpline number for emergencies.

According to the above survey, Nigerians fear being robbed (24%) or kidnapped (also 24%), falling victim to armed bandits or being robbed (both 8%) or being harmed in the herdsmen-farmers conflict (also 8%). This is followed by "ritual murders" (4%) and "Boko Haram" (3.5%).

==== Militant groups in the Niger Delta ====
The Buhari administration was able to temporarily appease militant groups in the Niger Delta through "guard contracts" and the associated payments. Critics see this as a modern-day indulgence trade or the subsidisation of criminals. See the relevant chapter.

==== Foreign policy ====
In November 2022, the US State Department removed Nigeria (and India) from the list of Countries of Particular Concern. This was done at the recommendation of the US Commission on International Religious Freedom (USCIRF) with reference to attacks by criminals against Christian missionaries in the Islamic north of Nigeria. Nigeria was placed on the aforementioned list in 2020 by then President Trump and his Secretary of State Pompeo.

=== Presidency Tinubu (since 2023) ===
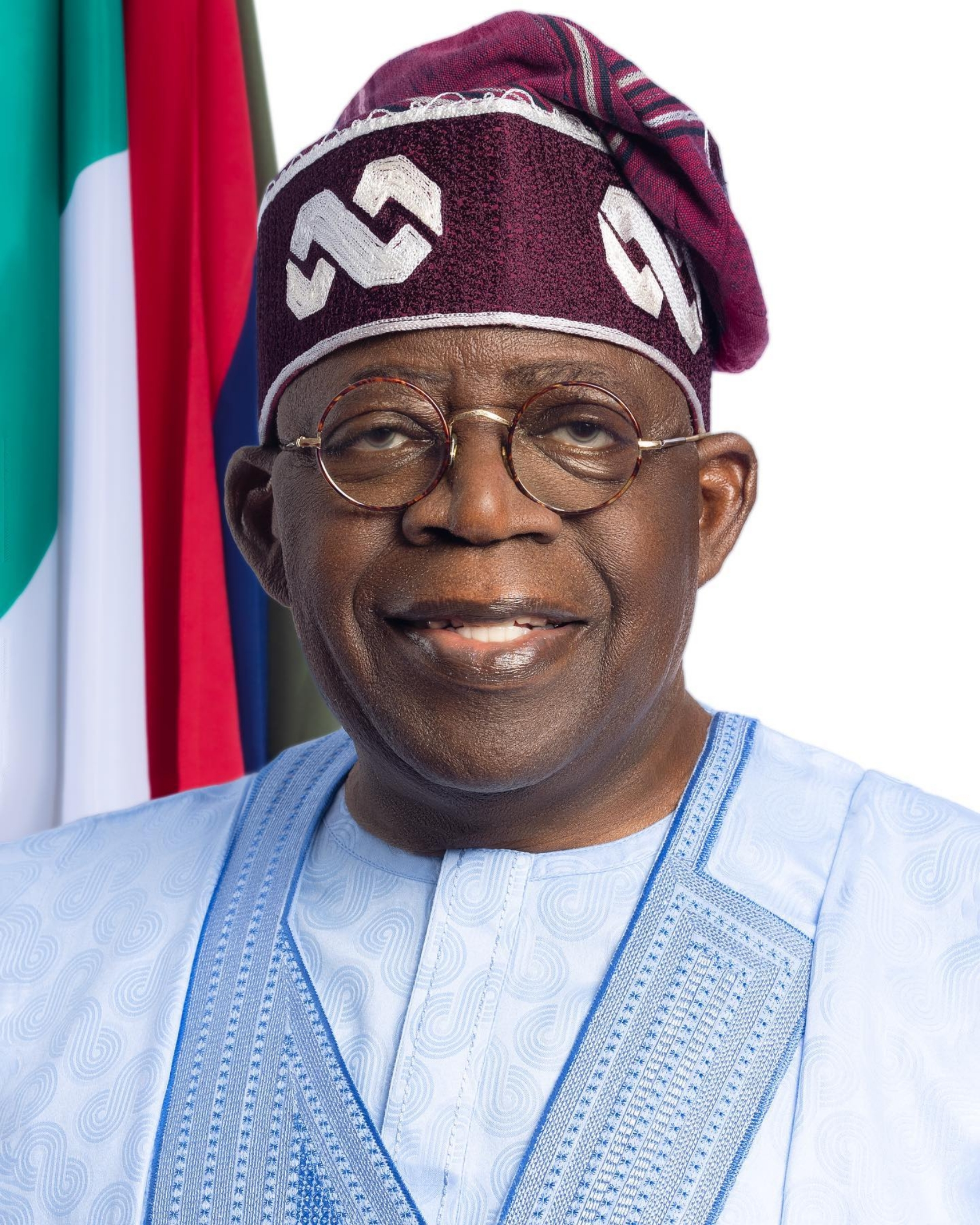
Bola Ahmed Tinubu President, Federal Republic of Nigeria (2023 - date)

The ruling All Progressives Congress (APC) candidate, Bola Tinubu, won the February 2023 presidential 2023 Nigerian presidential election to succeed Muhammadu Buhari as the next president of Nigeria. However, the opposition levelled accusations of electoral fraud in polls and challenged it in court. The supreme Court however upheld the victory of President Bola Tinubu till date he remains the Current Elected president of Nigeria. On 29 May 2023, Bola Tinubu was sworn in as Nigeria's president to succeed Buhari.

In his inaugural speech, Tinubu announced the abolition of state subsidies for fuel, and three weeks later he ended state support for the national currency, which subsequently plummeted to a quarter of its value. The situation since then has been described in the Nigerian media as ‘economic hardship’. According to an opinion poll conducted by API on 29 May 2024, 49% of Nigerians surveyed rate Tinubu's work after one year in office as ‘very bad’, 29% as ‘bad’ and only 4% as ‘good’. The biggest personal challenge cited by 36% of respondents was ‘hunger’, 28% were unable to finance ‘basic needs’, 13% were unable to find a job and 9% criticised the poor security situation (multiple answers were not permitted).

The rise in kidnappings is also likely to be a consequence of ‘economic hardship’. According to NOIPolls, 38% of Nigerians personally know a kidnap victim (as of May 2024). Of these 38%, 78% state that the victim was released and 57% that a ransom was paid. 5% of victims were killed. 56% of Nigerians believe that the government is not doing enough to combat the numerous kidnappings. Creating jobs (37%) and improving the security forces (22%) are cited as suitable countermeasures.

== See also ==
- History of Africa
- Historiography of the British Empire
- History of West Africa
- List of heads of government of Nigeria
- List of heads of state of Nigeria
- Politics of Nigeria
- Boko Haram
- History of cities in Nigeria:
  - Ibadan history and timeline
  - Kano history and timeline
  - Lagos history and timeline
  - Port Harcourt history and timeline
- National Archives of Nigeria
- Political violence in Nigeria
