= Kele =

Kele or KELE may refer to:

== People ==
- Kele people (Congo), a Bantu ethnic group
- Kele people (Gabon)
- Kele people (Nigeria), a Cross River ethnic group
- Kele Le Roc (born 1975), British R&B and UK garage singer
- Kele Leawere (born 1974), Fijian rugby union player
- Kele Okereke (born 1981), English musician, singer with Bloc Party also known mononymously
- Ke Le (born 1997), Malaysian and Singaporean host

== Languages ==
- Kele language (New Guinea)
- Kele language (Congo)
- Kele language (Gabon)
- Kele language (Nigeria)
- Kele languages, a Bantu subgroup

== Other uses ==
- Kélé, an Afro-Lucian religion
- Kele, Ethiopia, a town
- Kele (river), Yakutia, Russia
- KELE (AM), a radio station (1360 AM) formerly licensed to serve Mountain Grove, Missouri, United States
- KELE (FM), a radio station (92.5 FM) licensed to serve Mountain Grove, Missouri

== See also ==
- KELE (disambiguation)
