= List of villages in Ebonyi State =

This is a list of villages and settlements in Ebonyi State, Nigeria organised by local government area (LGA) and district/area (with postal codes also given).

== By postal code ==
LGA	District or area	Postal code	Villages
Afikpo North	Afikpo/Ehugbo	490101	Amachara; Amachi; Amaekwu; Amaizu; Amangbala; Amangwu; Amankwo; Amaobolobo; Amauro; Amauzu; Amuku; Egeburu; Enohia-Item; Enohia-Ntalu; Evuma; Itim Villages; Kpogirikpo; Mgbom; Ngodo; Nkpogoro Villages; Ohaisu Villages; Ubam; Ugwu-Egu-Villages; Ugwuegu Elu
Afikpo South	Amasiri	490103	Agbogo; Agbop; Akanto; Ama-Inyima; Amachara; Amacharaji; Amaegbu-Ezeke; Amakuma-Ezeke; Amaozara; Amaozara-Ndukwe; Amiy-Ndukwe; Egboha-Amuro; Elugo-Amakpu; Eziama-Ndukwe; Ihie-Agbo; Ihie-Amorie; Ihie-Elu; Ndi-Uko-Amuro; Ndiakpu
Afikpo South	Igli	490102	Agbogo; Amaozara; Ameta; Amikpo; Amorie; Elu-Ogo; Imoji; Orra
Afikpo South	Edda Land	490104	Ebunwana Edda; Nguzu Edda; Ekoli Edda; Umunna; Owutu Edda; Amangwu Edda; Oso Edda; Etiti Edda; Ogbu Edda; Itim Edda; Ndi Ofiba; Amaigbo;
Ebonyi	Amachi	480101	Abakaliki (Rural); Agalegu; Akpanya; Ameta; Egwudulegu; Ete; Ibom; Ijaga; Izzilokwo; Mgbabeluzor; Ndeboshi-Oku; Ndingwutu; Ndiofutu; Ndiudara; Ndoketa; Ndugbaleze; Nwanwu; Obeagu; Ochobu-Okum; Ofioku; Ogbuchia; Ohabele; Okoria; Onyikwa; Onyirigbo; Uburu; Uwarem
Ebonyi	Amagu	480107	Agalegu I; Agalegu II; Agukpobe; Alibaruhu; Amachi-Amagu; Amachi-Onuteta; Amechara; Amegu-Onicha; Amike; Eketube; Enwuagba; Enyibuchiri; Ezza Inyi; Ezza-Ebia I; Ezza-Ebia II; Igbegu-Amagu; Ishiagu; Magu-Amagu; Mgbalukwu-Amagu; Ndiakochi; Ndiegbe; Ndieze-Amagu; Ndinwamini; Ndiube; Nwafo-Ogu; Obegu Ebia; Obulechi; Oferekpe; Ohamini I; Ohamini II; Okpitumo-Amangu; Okpuru Egbu; Okwefurike; Olua; Opamma; Orizo
Ebonyi	Edda	480106	Abarigwe; Efunefune; Ibula; Ime Abali; Iyariya; Izziakpo; Ndi Anamacha; Ndiekpe; Ndiofutu; Oberu; Obovu; Ogada; Ohatekwe; Okaria; Okaria-Echi; Okpoduma; Onu Akpara; Oshimaka; Otam
Ebonyi	Ishieke	480108	Abarigwe; Alibaruhu; Anyadulogu; Edomia; Egwudilegu; Ekebeligwe; Enyibichiri; Ezza Ofu; Idembia; Ikelegu; Ishihumini; Ishile; Izenyi; Nchokefu; Ndiabo Ofoke; Ndiefi; Ndiogodo Aba; Ndiogodo Idoko; Ndioke; Obodo; Ochekwu; Odomoke; Oferekpe; Ogbuyaroku; Ohatekwe; Ojiegbe; Okpoduma; Omorodu; Onyirigbo; Oumini; Ugbana; Ugbovo
Ebonyi	Izzi Unuhu	480103	Abia; Agalegu; Alike Agbaja; Amaechara-Nkaleke; Ameta; Amozo; Ananchi-Nkaleke; Azama-Agbaja; Azu-Uda-Echara; Azuebirigba-Agbaja; Azugwu-Agbaja; Azuiyokwu-Agbaja; Echjara-Unuhu; Eguagu-Agbaja; Ekaeru-Inyimagu; Ezia-Agbaja; Ihweokpu-Nkaleke; Mgbabo; Ndiebo-Nkaleke; Ndieze-Nkaleke; Ndinwinyima-Echora; Ndiokwase-Echara; Ndizze-Agbaja; Obulechi-Agbaja; Obulechi-Nkaleke; Odiofia-Echara; Ofe-Iyi-Okwu; Okwefurike; Omege-Nkaleke; Unagboke-Inyimagu
Ebonyi	Nkaleke Achara	480102	Alibaruhu; Amachi; Amagu; Eke; Ekebe; Ekejube; Enwu Agba; Enwumini; Enyiagba; Enyibuchiri; Ete; Item; Mbamini; Ndi Ekpe; Ndibulofia-Echara; Ndiochi-Igbo; Ndiugbala; Ndiukabi; Nkoroma; Nwofo-Ogu; Obegu-Okpe; Ofia Ube; Oguzaruonmeya; Ojiegbe; Ojienya; Okaria; Okpanku; Okwefurike; Okworeka; Omege; Onyikwa; Oponma; Otam; Oterufie; Ozibo; Uburu; Ugbo-Enyim; Ukpachachia; Umuigwe
Ebonyi	Nkaleke Echara	480104	Aba; Azu-Oji-Ntezi Aba; Azu-Uda-Eda-Echora; Echi Aba; Edufu Akparata; Ezilulo-Eda Echara; Ishi Nwachi-Ntezi; Mbukobe-Ntezi Aba; Mgbabo Echara; Ndebe Oko Onuoha; Ndebo Abaofia; Ndebo Ede-Echara; Ndebo-Mgbabo-Echara; Ndebo-Opfunyionu; Ndu Ak-Eda Echara; Nedbo-Aghamohu; Nkebe-Opfunyionu; Ntezi Aba; Obegu Oroke Onuoha; Obegu-Aba Onu-Oji; Obegu-Aba-Ekpido; Obegu-Abaofra; Obegu-Aghamehu; Obegu-Opfunyionu; Ogboji Aba; Ogegu-; Okpuizumo; Udeku Aba
Ebonyi	Okpui-Tumo	480105	Agundzu; Ameji; Azuabe; Azuoto; Echegu Nkaleke; Edda Abarigwe; Efugbo; Egwuagu; Egwuagu Ndegu; Ephuenyia; Erueke; Igidiagu; Izekwe; Mba-Offia; Nchegbu; Ndebo-Odeligbo; Ndechi; Ndi-Igboke; Ndiaja; Ndialo; Ndimbam; Ndioduma; Ndioke; Ndiokenyi; Nkaleke; Obusia-Amechi; Odeligbo-Ndegu; Ohatekwe; Okpanku; Omege; Ovuoba; Ubegu-Odeligbo; Ubegu-Omege; Uwalakabe
Ezza North	Achara-Ezza	482105	Abam; Amebia; Ekerigwe; Ndiagu; Ndioffia; Ndufu Ukwuachi; Ndufu-Amelu; Ndufu-Azuinyirigwu; Ngbogoroafunu
Ezza North	Ama-Ezekwe	842110	Agbakoro; Eguefium; Iddao; Ndegeazu; Nudufu; Omege
Ezza North	Amagu	482115	Amagu; Ekwetekwe; Ekwurukwu; Enyim; Igbeagu; Ikwerikwo; Isiofffia; Ndufu Ndeguazu; Odeligbo; Ohaigbo; Ohaoffia; Okeagba; Oshugbo; Ugbodo; Ugbonia
Ezza North	Amana	482104	Agbakoro; Agbamegidi; Aghamehu; Amefi; Egogbo; Eguazuwhu I; Ndeguazu; Ndiagu Okaria; Ndufu; Ohaike; Ohuoguazuwhu II; Okaria; Tatakwu
Ezza North	Amawula	482117	Effium; Egwudilegu; Nkporume; Umuefi
Ezza North	Amazu	482101	Amuda; Enyima; Ndiaguazu; Ndufu I; Ndufu II; Ngbo; Ntezi; Omege; Onoffia; Onueke
Ezza North	Ameka	482109	Amagim; Amalekwune; Amaogwe; Ihoto; Ndiaguazu-Amajim; Ndiaguazu-Amalekwune; Ndufu-Amalokwune
Ezza North	Amuda	482121	Ikeregu; Ojorokpo
Ezza North	Amudo	482111	Agbaja; Akwunagu; Anyadilogu; Equinyima; Ndiagu; Ndueguazu; Nduwhu; Odoko; Ohetekwe; Okpagu
Ezza North	Ekka	482102	Azu-Ugwu; Azuakparata; Egu Eke; Ekka Village; Integration; Ndiagu; Ndufu; Ugrodo
Ezza North	Ezzama	482112	Ameta; Ekelebi; Ishieke; Ndiagakp; Ndiagu; Ohanya; Okaleka-Opazeka; Onicha; Onunwafor; Orokonu
Ezza North	Ikwato Idembia	482106	Amaparata; Azueseikpa; Azuide; Inyimagu; Ndiagu; Ndufu-Ide; Ngambo; Ochuhuagba; Odagere; Ohaffia; Ohage; Ohangbe; Onugbo; Onuorieagu; Ugwuogo; Ugwuogo Agu
Ezza North	Inyere	482114	Amagu; Umuechem; Umuefi; Umuobi
Ezza North	Nkomoro	482119	Agbakoro; Azuafor; Igweledoha; Ndeguazu; Obike; Ohinya; Omegu; Onuafor; Udenyi
Ezza North	Nsokara	482116	Amachi; Amaefi; Ameka; Egwudinagu; Ekebengwene; Ekwetekwe; Igweledoha; Izekwe; Ohankwu; Omege
Ezza North	Okffia	482113	Agukwuchie; Ananchi; Azuagu; Azuide; Enigwe; Evirigu; Ezufu; Igwefere; Ndiaguazu; Nwakparata; Obioma; Odagere; Ofutu; Ogbenu; Oguzaraonweya; Ojiegbo; Okalieru; Onuagbonyi; Uhuagba
Ezza North	Oriuozor	482103	Umuezeali; Umuezekwe; Umuigboke; Umuome; Umuouru
Ezza North	Ugboji	482108	Achiagu; Akpurata; Azuinyima; Ebushike; Mgbalibe; Ndiegu; Obaju; Ogbojiegu; Ohuola; Onunworie
Ezza North	Umuezeoka	482120	Ekwetekwe; Ndegu; Ndeguazu; Udenyi
Ezza North	Umuezeokaoha	482122	Anyagharigwe; Ededegu; Ndeagazu; Ohatekwe; Okaleru; Okposi; Omege; Oshiegbe; Owunweke; Ugbona
Ezza North	Umunw-Agu	482107	Agbakoro; Akpugo; Amagbia; Enurim; Enya-Gharaigwe; Enyadilogu; Eziga; Ndufu; Odagere; Omaji; Omege; Orogbodo; Orokome
Ezza North	Umuoga-Hara	482118	Enyim; Ndiaguazu; Oghara Ugo; Okposi
Ikwo	Akpan-Wudele	482126	Akahaufu; Akataka; Amokpo; Ebiem; Ifelemenu; Imabali; Mbada; Ndiechi; Ndioduma
Ikwo	Amain-Yima	482132	Aguinyima; Animocha; Enyim; Odeligbo
Ikwo	Echia-Like	482136	Amainyima; Amanguru; Amchara; Inyimagu Amaka; Ndiagu; Ndialegu; Ndioduma; Ndiona; Omege Ameka; Ugbodo-Echialike
Ikwo	Eka-Awoke	482124	Aguiyima; Echare-Ukwu; Ezeke; Ndigu Umoka; Ndiufu Umuota
Ikwo	Enyibichiri-Alike	482133	Ndiagu-Enyibichiri; Obeagu-Ndinwese; Obeagu-Ndinwosa; Obuluechi-Ndiechi; Obuluechi-Ndiewese; Obuluechi-Ohatekwe; Ubeagu-Ndiechi
Ikwo	Etim-Ekpuitumo	482130	Ebusieike; Elugu; Imenduru; Ivakpa; Ndiaguazu; Nduku; Nsuba
Ikwo	Igbudu	482127	Amudo; Imogo; Ishieke; Izo; Ndiofia; Ogagbo; Uduku; Umueh
Ikwo	Inyimagu	482134	Agbaenyim; Akahufu; Akataka; Amuna; Effie Mgbabo; Ibem; Obegu; Ochokwu; Odumowo; Ofenekpa; Oferekpe; Ugwueke; Ukwenyim
Ikwo	Ndiagu-Achara	482125	Agubata; Nzeshi Ndiagu; Okpara; Okpotokum; Omege
Ikwo	Ndiagu-Amagu	482128	Anyagbarigwe; Ekereikwo; Enyigwuchiri; Item Amagu; Ndieke; Nsobo-Okwuenyim; Ochieyin; Orona; Umuomara
Ikwo	Ndifu-Alike	482131	Agalagu; Enyim-Chukwu; Ogidiga; Ohankwu; Onyikwa; Ugwuefor
Ikwo	Ndufu-Achara	482123	Agubata-Ndufu; Ndiagu Umoka; Ndiufu Umuota; Nzashi; Oferekpe Nkalfor; Okpotokum
Ikwo	Ndufu-Amagu	482129	Abina; Agalagu; Akunkuna; Iginaledoba; Ndiofoke; Obegu-Ohatekwe
Ikwo	Noyo-Alike	482135	Bianji; Enukpeofia; Ikpta-Noyo; Ndiechi-Ndiagu; Ndiofia; Ndiogbu; Noyo; Omege; Onuofia-Ndiagu
Ishielu	Agba	481118	Aba-Ohofia; Achara; Agbaelu; Agbaelu-Aguabonyi; Agu-Ogbugo; Aguachara; Aguedene; Aguefi; Agulime; Agunecheonweya; Aguozu; Akwusakwu; Amachima; Amagu-Agba; Amorie; Ekwetekwe; Igwebuike; Isiagu; Ndiagu; Ohafia; Okwunyionu; Omege; Onueke; Ugbodo
Ishielu	Amazu	481121	Amanankwa; Egedegede; Ishielu; Iyieke; Nkorokpo; Umuonyi; Umuoshim; Wiagu
Ishielu	Azunyaba	481112	Agugede; Anyima; Azuofia; Ogbogum; Onuoji
Ishielu	Ebeagu Aut. Com.	481123	Ameta; Ikele; Obodoaba
Ishielu	Egge-Egde	481122	Egedegede; Emezu; Obubu
Ishielu	Emuhu-Ali	481120	Amaegu; Ameta; Amokwe; Amuogu; Azuofia; Azuogbagu; Ebieji; Ebusieike; Edemngwu; Egbelegu; Egwudinagu; Ogboeyim; Onumworie-Azumuru; Onunwafor; Onunwankwo I; Onunwankwo II; Onunweke; Onuoji; Overail
Ishielu	Ezillo	481111	Amaleze; Amihu; Amofia; Amorie; Amukpa; Umuakpu; Umuezekoha
Ishielu	Ezzagu	481119	Agunho; Aguobodo I; Aguobodo II; Amogyi; Ebusike; Isionwa-Miri I; Isonwumiri II; Obodoachi; Ogboji Centre; Ohinya; Ohuhu; Onuebonyi-Onunwankwo; Onunwefor; Onunweke; Ugboenyim
Ishielu	Iyonu	481115	Aguonwenkeya; Amagu; Ezza Iyonu; Obeagu; Umuneze; Umuogwa
Ishielu	Nkalagu	481114	Akiyi; Amanvu; Imoha; Ishiagu; Uwule
Ishielu	Nkalaha	481113	Amagu; Amaokwe; Amazezegba; Umeleha
Ishielu	Ntezi	481116	Agaga; Ulepa; Iyokpa; Amata; Biledeba
Ishielu	Ohofia	481118	Ishiagu, Ndieze, Okwuanyionu, Agunwogwu,Obodoigba, Aguefi , Igwebuike, Aguedene Amuzu ,Ndiaguazu, Ekwetekwe, Alioma, Aguachara urban, Ndi OSU, Agude Amuda , Aba Ohofia Azungele Aguogbugo Onueke Enyim
Ishielu	Okpoto	481117	Lobasa; Logbo; Logburegbe; Lokpo; Ndieze
Ivo	Akaeze	491104	Akaeze Ukwu; Ihenta; Iyoji; Umuobor
Izzi	Agbaja	480113	Edukpachi; Igbunu Oiuma; Igwekaeyim; Isohumiri; Ndioga; Nuofe; Ohuruekpe; Okpoduma
Izzi	Ezz-Inyi-Magu	480110	Azuda; Isiege; Ndieze; Ndiezeoke; Oyege
Izzi	Igbeagu	480109	Iboko; Ndigwe; Ndinwakpu; Ndiokpoto; Ndiubia; Nwaezariyi
Izzi	Mgbala Ukwu	480112	Aguegede; Anyima; Azuofia; Ndiebe-Ishiagu; Ndingale; Ndiogwu; Ochebe-Oza; Offia-Okan; Ogbegum; Onuoji
Izzi	Ndieze	480111	Agharaoza; Amaleze; Amihu; Amofia; Amorie; Amukpa; Nwana-Omege; Opaetifia; Oseokwuru; Umuakpu; Umuezekoha
Ohaozara	Ishiagu	491105	Afikpo Road; Amaeke; Amaeze; Amagu; Amaokwe; Amaonye; Amata; Eziato; Ihiali; Ihie I; Ihietutu; Nguogwo; Nzerem; Obinagu; Ogwor; Okue
Ohaozara	Okposi	491102	Amachi; Amelu Agu; Amenu; Anaeko/Mebiokpa; Mebiowa; Mgbom/Achara; Okposi Okwu; Umuekma; Umuka; Umunuka
Ohaozara	Uburu	491101	Amaenu; Amegu; Ihenu; Mgbom; Obiozara; Ogwu; Ubuaba; Umuagwu-Oke; Umuaneketa; Umuanum; Umuchima; Umuobuma; Umuodu-Igbo; Urobo
Ohaozara	Ugwu-Langwu	491103	Amaegudu; Amelu; Amenu; Anata; Mgbom; Ohachara; Ufuezeraku; Ufuovoke; Umuifere; Umuigboke
Ohaukwu	Amoffia Mgbo	481104	Abarigwe; Agu Ugwu; Ekwelekwe; Ishi Agu; Ndiagu Ominyi; Ndiagu Onwe; Ndulor; Ogbu Agu; Okwerike; Onweriji; Otuokpye; Owukpa
Ohaukwu	Effium	481110	Eguenyi; Azuedene; Ekendiagu; Forest-Ibenda; Igbudu-Oke; Imieyom; Inikiri; Lebadongom; Legadi; Ogbodo; Ohage; Okporo; Okposo Iyede; Onuebeta; Onunwokporo Okpudu; Onweigwe; Onyirigbo; Ugoeze; Ujulele
Ohaukwu	Ekwashi Mgbo	481108	Agugwu; Effia Ule Atani; Ekwashi; Ndiagu Idaja; Ndiagu Obu-; Ndiagu Onwe; Ndiagu Oshisha; Ndiagu-Ndulo-; Ndiagu-Obegu; Ndoke; Ogbeni; Okeali; Okpororo; Okwerike
Ohaukwu	Ezzamgbo	481101	Amanamta Ishi-Izhia; Amechi; Amike; Amovu; Ezzamagbo; Ndi-Akpu; Ndiagu Ogbodo; Nsulakpa; Umuagara; Umuebe; Umueze
Ohaukwu	Inikiri Umuezeoka	481105	Eguenyi I; Eguenyi II; Eguojaba; Nwokwo umueze; Onungamgbo igwe; Onu Inikiri; Onuzo Igwe; Onu igbe; Okoroko; Inikiri Bernard; Onunwokporo Okpudu; Azu igbe; Ohabuenyi; Uwhumba Etchi
Ohaukwu	Okposhi Mgbo	481107	Agbesha; Amokwo; Igwelede Oha; Ndiagu Ode; Ndiagu Onwe; Ndiagu Ubia; Ndiagu-Ubochi
Ohaukwu	Okposi Eheku	481100	Abogodo; Agbaba-Ameffia; Ameffia; Eshi; Inyimagu; Ndiagu Eshi; Ndiagu Obu; Ndiagu Obu Ameffia; Ndiulo; Ndiulo Amefia; Nkwolu; Ojiegbe; Otuokpeye
Ohaukwu	Ukwuagba Mgbo	481109	Aguachi; Aguorie; Ajilewe; Ndiagu Akparata; Ndiagu Anwu; Ndiagu Eze; Ndiagu Iyiogue; Ndiulo Ukwagba; Obomanagu; Ogbagede; Ogbeda; Okpochiri
Ohaukwu	Umuezeaka Ogbo	481102	Azu Egu; Ndegu Icha; Ndegu Obashi; Ndiagu Akpu; Ndiagu-Obu; Ndiegu Akparata; Ndiegu Eke-Ochie; Ndiegu-Obuegu; Ndiulo-Umuezeoka; Obodo Eje; Osha Egu
Ohaukwu	Umugudu	481106	Akpu; Amakpu; Egwudinagu; Nbiagu Nwite; Ndi Ulo Umugudu-; Ndiagu Agba; Ndiagu Orie; Obodo Ogbeni; Odebeor; Oriaja; Oshia Ituma; Umugudu; Umuimama
Ohaukwu	Umuogudu Oshia	481103	Abarigwe-Ndiagu; Effia Ulo; Effia-Ulo; Egu Ojo; Egwegwu; Ekweburu; Ndiagu Adsaburu-Ebenyi; Ndiagu Akparata; Ndiagu Udu; Ndiagu-Ugba; Ndiulu Umu-Oshia; Ogwudu Ano; Okorogbata; Osege; Ugum Ngbo
Onicha	Abaomege	491110	Anumocha; Ebusirike; Enyibuchiri; Okaria; Okworike; Omege
Onicha	Isu	491106	Agba; Agbabor; Agueke; Amannator; Isu-Achara; Mbala Ukwu; Mgbelaeze; Obeagu; Ojiegbe; Umunika
Onicha	Onicha	491108	Akanu; Amainyima I; Amainyima II; Amajo/Ufueze; Amakporor; Amananaator I; Amananator II; Amangwu; Amaokwe; Amata/Omirima; Amutu; Anike I; Anike II; Ezekporoke; Eziga; Isiama I; Isiama II; Ntika/Ntiabor; Ogono-Onmuja; Okuoma; Onyofia/; Ugwudiala; Ugwuenu; Umubo II; Umuezikwu; Umuobo I
Onicha	Oshiri	491107	Agbabi; Amaegu; Amankalu; Amaocha; Amaokpara; Isieke; Isinkwo; Iyiazu; Mboji; Owom; Ufuezokwu; Umuafia; Umuimam; Umumgbala; Umumboke; Umuorie
Onicha	Ukawu	491109	Amakpuma; Amofia; Azueonyi-Sub-Village; Ebulike; Ishinkwor; Ochege-Sub-Village; Okuzu I; Okuzu II; Okuzu Ngu-Enyi

== By electoral ward ==
Below is a list of polling units, including villages and schools, organised by electoral ward.

LGA	Ward	Polling unit name
Abakaliki	Abakpa	Adazi-Enu Hall I; Adazi-Enu Hall II; Co-Operative Square I; Co-Operative Square II; Nibo/Nsukka Str Junction I; Nibo/Nsukka Str Junction II; Vanco Hotel Space I; Vanco Hotel Space II; Onuebonyi Primary School; Girls High School Azuiyiokwu
Abakaliki	Amachi (Ndebo)	Oguchie Play Ground; Agalegu Primary School; Uburu Primary School; Ndiudara/ Ndiofutu Vill. Square; Izilokwo Mkt Square; Ndiugbala Vill. Square; Ndingwuta Pri. School; Ndiochiobuoku Pri. School; Egwudinegu Pri. School; Ndiebo Oshieku Play Ground
Abakaliki	Amachi (Ndegu)	Ijaga Play Ground; Ohabele Play Ground; Okaria Mkt Square; Onyikwa Vill. Square; Obeagu Ibom Village Square; Akpe Primary School; Ofiaoku Play Ground; Onyirigbo Primary School; Ete Village Square; Akpanya Village Square
Abakaliki	Amagu / Enyigba	Ebia Unuhu Primary School; Ndiurukwu Primary School; Nwofia Odo Play Ground; Azuakpara Ebia Play Ground; Mbamoko Ebia Mkt Square; Oriuzor/Omege Primary School; Ndunkwegu Primary School; Edukwu Obulechi Amagu; Eketube Enyigba Village Square I; Eketube Enyigba Village Square II; C. P. S. Ishiagu Enyigba I; C. P. S. Ishiagu Enyigba II; Alibaruhu Village Square Enyigba; Ndiagu Nwe Dedeagu C. P. S; Oferekpe Village Square
Abakaliki	Amagu Unuhu	Okpuitumo Play Ground; Customary Court Nkwegu; Nkwegu Primary School; Ezza Inyimagu Play Ground; C. P. S Amagu Onicha; Ndunwamini Village Square; Amachi Unuhu Village Square; Igbeagu Unuhu Village Square; Obeagu Amagu Onicha; Edukwu Amagu Onicha; Achi Village Square
Abakaliki	Azumini/Azugwu	Igweorie Open Space I; Igweorie Open Space II; Igweorie Open Space III; Ebsu Guest House I; Ebsu Guest House II; Azugwu/Abacha Junction; All Saints Primary School; Hill Top/Water Works; Elias Odili/Achi Junction
Abakaliki	Azuiyiokwu Layout	St. Theresas Primary School; Ezikwo Primary Schooli; Ezikwo Primary Schoolii; Arondiziugu Hall; Admin Comm College I; Admin Comm College II; Urban Center Primary School; Cinemahall; Arochukwu Lane/Ogoja Rd.; Ebsu Teaching Hospital
Abakaliki	Azuiyi Udene	Udoka Hall I; Udoka Hall II; Nwannedinamba Hall; Syno Guest House; 4b Onwuegbuna Open Space; 6 Ibeme Str. Open Square; Iyiudene Market Office I; Iyiudene Market Office II; Iyiudene Square I; Iyiudene Square II; Nkwogu Str. Open Space; Ebsu Nursery School; Jimmy Okonkwo Park; Ejidike/Agulu Chukwu Junction
Abakaliki	Edda	Ibula Play Ground; Okpoduma Village Square; Onuakpara Mkt Square; Ukwumango Izicha; Efunefune Play Ground; Odagerida Primary School; Ndiekpe Ofutu Square; Inyarinya Primary School; Okaria Echi Primary School I; Ohatekwe Play Ground; Obovu Play Ground; Okaria Edda; Okaria Echi Primary School II
Abakaliki	Izzi Unuhu	Edukwu Inyimagu Hall; Edukwu Odabara; Nkaliki Echera Primary School I; Nkaliki Echera Primary School II; Edukwu Okpokwu; Edukwu Okpunkaliki; Edukwu Ibina Alike; Edukwu Nwoge; Azima Village Squaure; Ndiofutu Play Ground; Onuebonyi Play Ground; Ogwudenyi Play Ground; Nwazunku Achi Junction; Izundu Open Space; Onuiyiokwu/Inyimagu Junction; Azuiyiokwu Primary School
Abakaliki	Ndiagu	Owerri Hall I; Owerri Hall II; Owerri Hall III; Ebotrans Open Space; Umuleri Open Space; Anyaiwo Open Space; Nkanu Open Space; Umuleri Junction Open Space; St. Theresas Junction Open Space I; St. Theresas Junction Open Space II; Water Works Open Space I; Water Works Open Space II; Obodoukwu Open Space; Obi/Obiri Open Space; Oraeri Hall I; Oraeri Hall II
Abakaliki	Okpoitumo Ndebor	Ndigwe Play Ground; High Hill Primary School; Igidiagu Primary School; Nkemdirim/Ndiokenyi; Ndiokenyi Village Square; Ndebor Okpoitumo Mkt; Ndimbam Play Ground; Obeagu Okpuitumo; Shed Ekori
Abakaliki	Okpoitumo Ndiegu	Nwalagba Mkt Square; Egwudinagu Ndiebor; Uwalakande Ndiagu Square; Ohatekwe Ndiagu; Okwunyirionu Primary School I; Okwunyirionu Primary School II; Ovuoba Primary School
Abakaliki	Timber Shed	Akparata Play Ground; Timber Shed Square; Okposhi Str Nursery School; Nkaliki/ Nzekwe; Ebsu Presco Campus; Murtala Mohammed; Nwigboagu Square; Afoezuna Str Square; Alike Square; Ezinifite Play Ground
Afikpo North	Amata-Akpoha	Amachi Play Ground I; Amachi Play Ground II; Ezimba Play Ground; Evuko Village Square; Evuko Square; Ezimba Square; Amata Elu Play Ground; Amaozara Village Square I; Amaozara Village Square II; Amagu Play Ground I; Amagu Play Ground II
Afikpo North	Amogu Akpoha	Ezi Uro Play Ground; Ezi Ebiakpu Play Ground; Amaogu Play Ground; Ezi Eni Village Square; Ezi Etee Ugo Play Ground; Evoakpu/Okevo Square; Ezi Udu Uche V. Square; Ezi Oboti Village Square; Ezi Oko Village Square I; Ezi Oko Village Square II; Ezi Alu Agbo Play Ground; Amogu Play Ground 11
Afikpo North	Ezeke Amasiri	Amaekuma Play Ground; Ezeke Primary School; Orie Market Square; Ogo Ubi Primary School; Ama Okpu Village Square; Amachi Ndukwe Village Square; Amaozara Ndukwe Square; Amuji Ndukwe Village Square; Ogo Amaogwugwu; Amuro; Amebo Ndukwe Village Square; Akanto Primary School
Afikpo North	Poperi Amasiri	Ihuogo Village Square; Ezi Otu Village Square; Ohaukwu Village Square; Uhere Village Square; Obenne Hall; Ezi Egwu Okehie; Ogwu Uhie Village Square; Amasiri Motor Park; Ihie Agbo Village Square I; Ihie Agbo Village Square II; Ihie Village Square; Central Sch. Ozara; Ihie Field II
Afikpo North	Itim Afikpo	Mgbom Village Square I; Mgbom Village Square II; Mgbom Play Ground; Echara Mgbom Village Square II; Amuro Town Hall; Amuro Mgbom Village Square; Amuro Village Square; Enohia Nkalu Square; Itim Ukwu Primary School; Kpoghirikpo Play Ground; Enohia Itim Play Ground; Amenu Amuro Village Square; Ameke Mgbom Village Square; Mgbom Village Square IV
Afikpo North	Ibii/Oziza Afikpo	Ezi Akpueke Village Square; Agbogohouse Civic Center; Ezi Uduma Village Square; Ezi Ugwute Play Ground; Amata/Amoge Town Hall; Amika/Amoge Cps; Amainyime Town Hall; Ibii Primary School; Amorie Village Square; Agba Central School; Amaozara Primary School
Afikpo North	Nkpoghoro Afikpo	Nnaenyim Village Square I; Nnaenyim Village Square II; Nnaenyim Village Square III; Ndibe Play Ground; Ezi Inya Village Square; Ndibe Primary School; Amankwu/Amaekwu Square; Amankwu/Amaekwu Play Ground; Amankwo/Amabolobo Primary School I; Amankwo/Amabolobo Primary School II; Amankwo/Amabolobo Primary School III; Amuzu Square; Amuzu Village Square; Amankwo/Amaekwu Square
Afikpo North	Ohaisu Afikpo A	Ukpa/Amachi Primary School; Ukpa Play Ground I; Ukpa Play Ground II; Egbeberi/Amachraagbo; Amachara Play Ground; Ngodo/Amachi Primary School; Amachi Village Square; Amachi Square; Ngodo/Amachi Primary School II
Afikpo North	Ohaisu Afikpo B	Amangbala Square; Amangbala Play Ground; Amangbala Village Square; Egbeburu Play Ground; Eke Amangbala Square; Amangbala Evuma Square; Ebe Buru Square; New Site; Amangbala Village Square II
Afikpo North	Ugwuegu Afikpo	Agboride/Amaizu Play Ground; Ezi Ukwu Play Ground; Amaizu Library; Amaizu Village Square; Amaha Play Ground; Ubam/Amebor Play Ground I; Ubam/Amebor Play Ground II; Uga/Ugelu Town Play Ground; Ezi Uzuekwe Play Ground I; Ekuma Play Ground; W. T. C Primary School; Ezi Uzuekwe Play Ground II; Amancho Play Ground
Afikpo North	Uwana Afikpo 1	Ezi Oti Inya; Aifpua Center CafÉ; Ezi Ukwu Amagu I; Ezi Ukwu Amagu II; Ezi Ukwu Amagu Ndemiyi; Nkagbogo Village Square I; Nkagbogo Village Square II; Unwana Comp. Sec. School
Afikpo North	Uwana Afikpo II	Ezi Akaa; Ndi Owara Village Square; Efe Amaekwu I; Efe Amaekwu II
Afikpo South	Amaeke Ekoli	Nkaogbogo Village Hall; Amankwu Village Hall; Ndinnachi Village Hall; Ndi Enworo Town Hall; Amaeke Village Hall; Amaeke Village Square; Egbebu Central School 1; Egbebu Central School 11
Afikpo South	Amangwu	Amukwa/Amebo Town Hall; Ndi Okoro Town Hall I; Ndi Okoro Town Hall II; Okpoma Village Hall; Amaiyinta Village Hall I; Amaiyinta Village Square; Amaiyinta Village Hall II; Ndiebo Village Hall I; Ndiebo Village Hall II; Odughohu Town Hall; Asaga Primary School; Asaga Village Hall
Afikpo South	Amiri Ekoli	Ugwu Elu Village Hall; Ugwu Elu Village Square; Amanta Village Hall; Amaogbu Village Hall; Amaogbu Village Square; Amaogbu Town Hall; Ndi Ibom Village Hall I; Ndi Ibom Village Hall II; Ndi Ibom Village Square
Afikpo South	Amoso	Ezi Edda Community Hall I; Ezi Edda Community Hall II; Amagbo Town Hall; Echara Village Hall; Ejikewu Primary School; Ndi Oyim Community Hall I; Ndi Oyim Community Hall II; Ndi Chima Village Hall
Afikpo South	Ebunwana	Okenkwu Village Hall I; Okenkwu Village Hall II; Okenkwu Village Hall III; Okenkwu Village Square; Amorji Village Hall I; Amorji Village Hall II; Amaeke Village Square I; Amaeke Village Square II; Amaeke Village Hall I; Amaeke Village Hall II; Amaemu Village Square; Igbara Village Hall; Ukwuachi Mkt. Square
Afikpo South	Etiti Edda	Ekeje Town Hall; Amaigbo Town Hall; Amaigbo Primary School I; Amaigbo Primary School II; Orienta Primary School; Amancho Village Hall; Ndi-Ofiba Village Square; Amaigbo Village Square; Ndi-Iba Village Square
Afikpo South	Ndioke Ekoli	Emekwe Primary School I; Emekwe Primary School II; Isi Ama Ise Primary School I; Isi Ama Ise Primary School II; Ekula Primary School I; Ekula Primary School II; Uburu Hall
Afikpo South	Nguzu	Ifuogo Village Hall; Ezechi Primary School I; Ezechi Primary School II; Amorji Village Hall; Library Hall; Elugwu Town Hall; Amankwo Village Hall; Amaiyi Primary School I; Amaiyi Primary School II; Nguzu Primary School I; Nguzu Primary School II; Nguzu Primary School III
Afikpo South	Ogbu (Amato)	Akpughuru Town Hall; Igwe Memorial Primary School; Umunnabuike Primary School; Itim Sec. School; Itim Primary School; Itim Village Hall
Afikpo South	Oso	Amaechi Primary School; Ndiuche Community Hall; Amaosonta Village Hall; Ndiokpo Village Hall; Ndiobasi Village Hall I; Ndiobasi Village Hall II; Igboro Primary School I; Igboro Primary School II; Igboro Primary School III; Okporojo Village Square; Ndi Okpo Town Hall; Ndi Ugbo Village Square; Okporojo Primary School
Afikpo South	Owutu	Central School Owutu I; Central School Owutu II; Akanu Town Hall; Amukabi Town Hall; Ndi Ewa Village Hall; Amaeke Village Hall; Umunnato Primary School; Amaekpu Town Hall; Owutu Motor Park I; Owutu Motor Park II; Udeazi Village Hall; Ufu Eseni Town Hall; Amaebo Village Hall; Amaebo Play Ground; Ufueseni Village Hall
Ebonyi	Abofia	Obeagu Abofia Hall; Ndiabo Abofia Village Square; Aghamehu Village Square; Okwuinyionu Play Ground; Ogboji Abofia Age Grade Hall; Edukwu Abofia Age Grade Hall; Oroke Onuoha Play Ground
Ebonyi	Agalegu	Obobo Primary School; Edeja Primary School; Mile 4 Play Ground; Ugbodo Primary School; Abarigwe Primary School; Ezza Ophu Play Ground; Ohatekwe Play Ground
Ebonyi	Echiaba	Nnodo Boys Secondary School; Ugwu Echara Primary School; Ebebe Play Ground I; Age Grade Hall; Obeagu Ntezi Aba Vill. Hall I; Ebebe Play Ground II; Ebebe Play Ground III; Mile 50 (Opp. Bishop House); Presco Secondary School; Mgbabo Achara Play Ground; Bore Hole Amike Aba; Obeagu Ntezi Aba Vill. Hall II
Ebonyi	Egwudinagu	Egwudinagu Hall; Onyirigbo Primary School; Ndiechi Village Hall; Uloanwu Primary School; Affenyim Play Ground; Affenyim Village Square
Ebonyi	Enyibichiri I	Oguzoronweya Primary School I; Oguzoronweya Primary School II; Ojiegbe Primary School; Item Primary School; Ete Nkorom Primary School; Ndiofia Echara Primary School; Ukpachacha Primary School; Mbamini Primary School; Umuigwe Primary School; Ndiofia C. C. D Primary School
Ebonyi	Enyibichiri II	Enyibichiri Play Ground; Ozibo Play Ground; Ndukabi Play Ground; Okworeka Play Ground; Oterufie Play Ground; Okaria Primary School; Ojianya Primary School; Ogbaga Primary School I; Ogbaga Primary School II; Obegu Ezza Play Ground; Okworeka Play Ground II
Ebonyi	Kpirikpiri	Station Urban Primary School I; Station Urban Primary School II; Stadium Cover; Enugwu Ukwu Hall I; Enugwu Ukwu Hall II; Govt. Trade Centre I; St. Patricks Primary School; Govt. Trade Centre II; Obodo Park; Ukwuakpu Market Square I; Ukwuakpu Market Square II
Ebonyi	Mbeke	Mbeke Primary School; Ohageledo Primary School; Ohageledo Village Square; Nwodebo Primary School; Ekebeligwe Primary School; Ekebeligwe Village Square
Ebonyi	Ndiebor	Ndiebor Primary School; Ugbona Primary School; Odomoke Primary School; Alibaruhu Village Hall; Ededagu Primary School; Edukwu Ogbo Primary School; Ndioke Village Square; Udoka Market Stall; Ebsuc, Ishieke
Ebonyi	Onuenyim	Okworike Play Ground; Igweledoha Play Ground; Ndiofia Market Square; Onuenyim Play Ground
Ebonyi	Urban New Layout	New Layout Primary School I; New Layout Primary School II; New Layout Primary School III; New Layout Primary School IV; Nut Premises; Vet. Centre; Gunning Road/Water Works; Okpaugwu Primary School; Child Welfare
Ezza North	Amuda / Amawula	Central School Amuda; C. P. S. Ndiabora; Nwankwo Amuda; Ebuku Amuda; Ndiagu Ukoro Town Hall; Ndiagu Nwakparata; Comm. School Amawula; Nwankwo Achi/Central School Amawula; Amawula Town Hall I; Amawula Town Hall II; Amawula Village Square
Ezza North	Ekka	Ekka Village Hall; Igbudu Ekka; Osusara; Comm. School Ekka; Enyibichiri Hall Ekka; Ngamgbo Okworike; Nwafor Ishienyi; Ngamgbo-Mgbo Ekka; Integration Primary School; Ngamgbo Agashi; Umuobi Ekka Hall
Ezza North	Inyere	Umuekee Inyere Hall; Onunworie Elom; Ngamgbo Oji-Egbe; Ngamgbo Enyibichiri; Ngamgbo Nwakpaka
Ezza North	Ndiaguazu - Umuoghara	Ngamgbo-Igweledeoha; Azu Isuma; Ngamgbo Azuose; Onuzo Nwokerekwu; C. P. S Ogharugo; Onuebonyi Nwankwo; Upe Ogudali; Ngamgbo Enyirinwa; Ngamgbo Ohinya
Ezza North	Nkomoro	Ohaike; Comm. School Onuafor; Omege Ohaike; Cps Udenyi Nkomoro; Central School Udenyi; Ngamgbo Nkomoro; Omege Ngamgbo Noko; Igweledeoha; Ngamgbo Igweledeoha; Amenyi; Ngamgbo Igboke; Comm. School Udenyi; Ngamgbo Ohaike Nkomoro
Ezza North	Okposi Umuoghara	Ekwetekwe; C. P. S Enyim; C. P. S Ugalaba I; C. P. S Ugalaba II; Ekuji Enyim; C. S Okposi I; C. S Okposi II; Onunworie Ndiabo; Enyibichiri; Ngamgbo Ugbaloke; Uhuba Ogbaga; Ngamgbo Eze; Comm. Pri. Sch. Okposi
Ezza North	Omege Umuezeokoha	Orie Nduhu; Ngamgbo Ugwuekwo; Ugbona Onu Orie; Ngamgbo Igwe Okaleru; Com. Pri. Sch. Campus Omege I; Ngamgbo Onuegbe; Com. Pri. Sch. Campus Omege II; Okpuenyi Onu; Comm. Sec. Sch. Umuezeokoha 1; Comm. Sec. Sch. Umuezeokoha 11; Ngamgbo Ugbona Ohagolode; Ngamgbo Onuzo Egbe; Onu Nworie Ebiaji; Ngamgbo Omege; Ngamgbo Odedeagu; Ngamgbo Okwefuru Ike
Ezza North	Oriuzor	Ohagelode Umuigboke; C. P. S Umuigboke; Ngamgbo Igwekeoru; Umunoko Agbom; Central School Oriuzor; Ngamgbo Igwe; C. P. S. Umoke; Onunwankwo Agba; Nweke Ekpuru; Odeligbo Village Hall; Ngamgbo Odeligbo; Amogbu Umueziali; Comm. School Oriuzor; Ngamgbo Owa; Ngamgbo Edege
Ezza North	Oshiegbe Umuezeokoha	C. P. S Oshiegbe I; C. P. S Oshiegbe II; C. P. S Oshiegbe III; C. P. S Azuitumo I; C. P. S Azuitumo II; C. P. S Azuitumo III; Azuitumo Town Hall; Etegidigwe I; Etegidigwe II; Anachi Town Hall; Anachi Play Ground; Enyiarigwe; Ukwoma; Ngamgbo Ukwoma
Ezza North	Umuezeoka	Azitumo Ekwetekwe; Ngamgbo Omege; C. P. S Ndiagu Ekwetekwe; Ngamgbo Akwa Omege; Central School Umuezoka; Ngamgbo Enyagrigwe; Ndiagu Ogbuinyiagu; St. Aidans Secondary School Umuezeoka; Udenyi Comm. School; Alubeleke Town Hall; Okoroko Town Hall; Ngamgbo Enarina; Ngamgbo Ekwu
Ezza South	Amaezekwe	Abaji Village Square; Agbakoro Village Square; Ndufu Village Square I; Ndufu Village Square II; Comm. Pri. School Amaezekwe; Ngamgbo Ndiaguzu Village Square
Ezza South	Amagu/Nsokkara	Central School Nsokkara I; Nwankwo Edegbe Village Square; Ngamgbo Omege; Central School Nsokkara II; Comm. School Nsokkara; Ngamgbo Ekwetekwe Village Square I; Ngamgbo Ekwetekwe Village Square II; Ngamgbo Ndufu Village Square; Comm. School Amagu Village Square; Azunwachi Village Square; Ekwurekwu Village Square; Ndiagu Agalagu; Ngamgbo Amaokpu Village Square I; Ngamgbo Amaokpu Village Square II
Ezza South	Amana	Ngamgbo Odanara Village Square; Nwagodo Market Square; Central School Ndiagu Amana I; Central School Ndiagu Amana II; Ngamgbo Utara Village Square; Eguazuhu Play Ground; Ngamgbo Onuzonwogwu; Central School Amana; Nworie Ndiaguazu Market Square; Ezekuna Play Ground
Ezza South	Ameka	Ngamgbo Enyim I; Ngamgbo Enyim II; Ngamgbo Enyim III; Comm. Primary School Amajim I; Comm. Primary School Amajim II; Ngamgbo Ukoro; Ngamgbo Ihotor; Ngamgbo Omege I; Ngamgbo Omege II; Comm. Primary School Ndiagu Azu; Amaogwe Village Square I; Amaogwe Village Square II; Ngamgbo Ukoro Ihotor; Ndufu Village Square
Ezza South	Amudo/Okoffia	Oriegbe Market Square I; Oriegbe Market Square II; Oriegbe Market Square III; Comm. Pry. School Amudo; Ngamgbo Nwele Village Square; Oboma Okoffia Village Square I; Oboma Okoffia Village Square II; Ugwefere Okoffia Vill Square I; Ugwefere Okoffia Vill Square II; C. S Ndiagu Okoffia Village Square; Okaleru Village Square; Evuruigu Village Square
Ezza South	Amuzu	Comm. Secondary School Amuzu I; Comm. Secondary School Amuzu II; Comm. Secondary School Amuzu III; Ogewekwe Village Square Hall I; Ogewekwe Village Square Hall II; Orinte Play Ground; Ohofia Play Ground; Ntezi Amuzu Play Ground I; Ntezi Amuzu Play Ground II; Inyima Village Square; Omege Play Ground
Ezza South	Echara	Ngamgbo Amebo Village Square I; Ngamgbo Amebo Village Square II; Ngamgbo Amebo Village Square III; Central School Echara; Azuebonyi Echara Village Square I; Azuebonyi Echara Village Square II; Ekereigwe Village Square; Amebia Village Square; Ngamgbo Akataka Village Square I; Ngamgbo Akataka Village Square II; Ngamgbo Abam Village Square
Ezza South	Ezzama	Comm. School Ameta I; Comm. School Ameta II; Ngamgbo Kpakpaji; Onunwafor Village Square; Central School Onunwafor; Ngamgbo Ekelebi; Ohinya Village Square; Onunwankwo Play Ground; Ngamgbo Ishieke Square; Oroke Onuoha Village Square; Opaleke Village Square; Imeabali Village Square I; Imeabali Village Square II
Ezza South	Ikwuator/Idembia	Azuebonyi Village Square I; Azuebonyi Village Square II; Nwankwo Ugwuogo I; Nwankwo Ugwuogo II; Ugwugo Azuebonyi; Orie Market Square I; Orie Market Square II; Ngamgbo Ohage I; Ngamgbo Ohage II; Onunwafor Village Square; Ngamgbo Inyima Egu I; Ngamgbo Inyima Egu II; Ochuhu Agba Village Square I; Ochuhu Agba Village Square II; Onunwankwo Ezekuna
Ezza South	Onueke Urban	Onueke/Afikpo Road; Onueke Market Square I; Egudiegwu / Akafi Village Square; Onueke Market Square II; Ndi Achi Play Ground; Ikwo Road Junction; Oferekpe Village Square; Onueke Village Square; Onueke Motor Park I; Onueke Motor Park II; Central School Onueke I; Central School Onueke II
Ezza South	Umunwagu / Idembia	C. P. S Umunwagu; Onunwankwor Village Square; Orokome Village Square; Eziga Village Square I; Eziga Village Square II; Amebia Village Square I; Amebia Village Square II; Azuebonyi Village Square; Ngamgbo Akpiko Village Square; Ngamgbo Akpugo Square; Omege Akpugo Square; Central School Idembia
Ikwo	Ama Inyima	Edukwu Enyim Play Ground; Ogidiga Play Ground; Comm. Primary School Okpuitumo; Imediagu Annumocha; Odeligbo Hall; Idah Play Ground; Edukwu Edeugbala Play Ground; Aguinyima Play Ground
Ikwo	Echialike	Ndiova Enyim Play Ground; C. P. S Echialike; Ofutu Enyi Play Ground; Edukwuede Play Ground; Ikpurukpu Play Ground; Ugbodo Village Square; Okpashi Play Ground; Aliukwunta Play Ground; Ndioduma Play Ground; Omege Echialike; Ndiakparata Play Ground; Ndiova Village Square; Ndiova Echialike Village Square; Nwugota Market Square; Ndinwesa Ndiagu Echialike; Edennyeka Play Ground
Ikwo	Eka Awoke	Echara Ukwu Play Ground; C. S Onuafiukwa; Afiukwa Market Square; Ndufu Umota Play Ground; Aguinyima Primary School
Ikwo	Ekpanwudele	Edukwu Amakpo Town Hall; Akahufu C. P. S Ekpanwudele; Girils High School Ikwo; Ndioduma Play Ground; Ndiechi Play Ground Ekpanwudele; Ebiem Play Ground; Akataka Play Ground; Imabali Play Ground; Mbada Play Ground; Ifelemenu Play Ground
Ikwo	Ekpelu	Nkwuda Market Square; C. P. S. Ekpelu Play Ground; Amainyima Ekpelu Play Ground; Inyimagu Amaeka Mkt Square; Amachara Play Ground; Amangwuru Town Hall
Ikwo	Enyibichiri	C. S Ndiaguaziu; Edukwu Ohatekwe Play Ground; Ukwu Mango Obegu Ohatekwe; Mgbede Play Ground; Ndubia Play Ground; Edukwu Obovu Ndiaguazu Play Ground; Ebusike Play Ground I; Ebusike Play Ground II; Ndiechi Play Ground; Edukwu Akpuru Nkele; C. S Enyibichiri; C. S Odariko; Nkaleke Play Ground; Ojon Market Square; Ndiakparata Ndinwesa; Ndinwesa Play Ground; Ndiji Akpu Play Ground
Ikwo	Etam	Edukwu Agbalagu; Alo Nwekoyo Station I; Alo Nwekoyo Station II; Ngamgbo Okpata; Royal Primary School Ivu Akpa
Ikwo	Igbudu I	Amuda Play Ground; Agubia Motor Park; Edukwu Uduku Town Hall; Comm. School Ndufu Igbudu Ishieke; Imogo Play Ground; Ndioffia Town Hall
Ikwo	Igbudu II	Ome Market Square; Okonogu Town Hall; Izo Town Hall; Ogagbo Town Hall; Ode Kputara Play Ground; Ndi Ebonyi Play Ground
Ikwo	Inyimagu I	C. P. S Igboji; C. P. S Ekpa Ibiam; Obegu / Inyimagu Play Ground; Effimgbabo Village Square; Ekpa Ibiam C. P. S
Ikwo	Inyimagu II	C. P. S Akahufu Inyimagu; Akahufu Market Square; C. P. S Odomowo; Odomowo Play Ground; Oferekpe Play Ground; Ndiagu Play Ground; Oferekpe C. P. S; Ugwueke Play Ground; Ochokwu Play Ground; Ofenakpa Play Ground; C. S. P Ofenakpa; Ukwuenyim C. P. S; Edukwu Okoshdo
Ikwo	Ndiagu Amagu I	Ndiechi Amagu Play Ground; C. P. S Ndiagu Amagu; Edukwu Omege; Agbakoro Ndiagu Play Ground; Obegu Omege; Ohankwu Omege; Okwerike Play Ground; Edukwu Ndiekete; Ndiekete Play Ground; Oronga Amagu; Omege Oronga; Onyikwa Amagu Play Ground; Nsobo Play Ground
Ikwo	Ndiagu Amagu II	Enyibichiri Amagu Play Ground; Item Amagu Play Ground I; Item Amagu Play Ground II; Nwgamgbo Market Square; Ochienyim Play Ground; Akahufu Amagu Play Ground; Obushile Play Ground; Item / Obegu C. P. S
Ikwo	Ndiagu Echara I	Omege Senior Primary School; Ofutu Omege; Ukwuachi Nzashi; Ogbenu Nzashi; Olua Play Ground; Junior Primary Omege; Odariko Nzashi; Akpakwuru Nzashi Play Ground; Ndiagu Nzashi Play Ground; Akahufu Omege
Ikwo	Ndiagu Echara II	Ndiogodoshi Ground Farm; Onyirigbo Play Ground; Mbukobe Ndioduma 0kp0t0kum; Ugbodo Play Ground; Community Primary School Ugbodo; C. S Ndiagu Echara; Nwode Market Square; C. P. S Ndiagu Okpera; Akahufu Okpera Play Ground; Obeagu Azuofe Play Ground; Okpera Play Ground
Ikwo	Ndufu Amagu I	Agalagu Play Ground; Ndiofoke Play Ground; Obegu Ndiofoke; Odeligbo Play Ground; Agbabor C. P. S Akunakuma; Akunakuna Play Ground
Ikwo	Ndufu Amagu II	Ndiagu Igkweledoha; Edukwu Ophunu; Igweledoha Play Ground; Cooperative Hall Abina I; Cooperative Hall Abina II; Cooperative Hall Ohatekwe
Ikwo	Ndufu Alike	Umunnato C. S Nwakpu; Nwakpu Market Square I; Nwakpu Market Square II; Enyim Agalegu Play Ground; Izzamgbo Agalegu Primary School; Onyikwa C. S. P; Ngamgbo Ozabe Play Ground; Ugwuafor Village Play Ground; Enyimchukwu Play Ground; Ukwuinyima Agalegu C. S. P I; Ukwuinyima Agalegu C. S. P II
Ikwo	Ndufu Echara	C. S. P Ndufu Echara; Amegu Echara Play Ground; Nwode Market Square; Eleke Play Ground; Okpotegu Play Ground; Ndiechi Achara Market Square; Obeagu Amegu Echara Play Ground; Nwafia Okpera; Ugbo Nzashi Play Ground; Obeagu Nzashi Play Ground; Amuda Nzashi Echara; C. P. S Onuebony Nzashi; Obeagu Eleke Nzashi; Nwafia Akpe Market Square; Obege Ndufu Echara Play Ground
Ikwo	Noye Alike	C. P. S Noyo; Ndiogbu Play Ground; Ndiaffia Play Ground; C. S Ndiagu Noyo; Ebiaji Play Ground; Omege Play Ground
Ishielu	Agba	Odoakwu Omege Market Square; Ndiaguazu Agba Play Ground; Eke Agbaelu Market Square; Ngamgbo Ode Village Hall; Eke Omege Play Ground; Amagu Agba C/School; Ngamgbo Ezemkpurakwu Play Ground; Agbaelu - Ulo Play Ground; Ekeomege Akwurakwu Primary School; Nkwo Akwurakwu Market Square
Ishielu	Amaezu	Ndi Agu Azu Ora Hall; Amaezu Junction Hall; Amaezu Primary School Iyieke; Okpuali / Umuonyi Hall
Ishielu	Azuinyaba \A\'	Anyim Play Ground; Aguegede Town Hall I; Ogbogum Primary School II; Azuofia Primary School II; Onuoji Primary School
Ishielu	Azuinyaba \B\'	Ogbogum Play Ground; Ngamgbo Oja; Onunwankwo Market; Nwa Ebomoha Market; Azuofia Primary School I
Ishielu	Ezillo I	Amebenyi Play Ground I; Amebenyi Play Ground II; Amuhu Primary School; Obodo Igbudeze; C. P. S Ezza Ezillo Primary School; Ugbonia Primary School; Onunwafor Ezza Market Stall; Egufo Amuhu Play Ground; Amuhu Aguose Village Square; Eke Ali Oji Village Square; Amaofia Play Ground; Amukpa Play Ground
Ishielu	Ezillo II	Umuezekoha T/Hall; Amaleze Play Ground; Obuchiri Play Ground; Iduma Primary School; Umuakpu Play Ground; Umuogiri Play Ground; Umuezoke Play Ground; Ubojima Village Square; Onueko Comm. School; Ndiagu Ugwu Play Ground; Amanka Play Ground
Ishielu	Ezzagu I (Ogboji)	Ngamgbo Uhuola Play Ground; Nweke Ohuhu Market; Enyibichiri Market Square 1; Enyibichiri Market Square 11; Nweke Ohuhu Market Square; Nome Onwe Play Ground Hall; Aguotu Primary School; Ngamgbo Ola Play Ground; Aguho Primary School; Onunwankwo Ohinya Market Square; Onunwankwo Ekechi Play Ground; Onunwankwo Egucha Kuru Market Square
Ishielu	Ezzagu II (Nkomoro)	Ngamgbo Oka Village Square; Ukwuachi Play Ground; Nwankwo Achi Play Ground; Ezza Obeagu C/School; Onunwafor Market Stall; Ngamgbo Agu Obodo Village Square; Ngamgbo Nwigiri; Ojiegbe II Play Ground; Onu Nwaeke Market Square; Onu Nwaeke Primary School; Onungamgbo Ezeali P/Ground; Onu Zoramia Rachita Play Ground; Ngamgbo Ishenyi Village Square; Ugbo Anyim Primary School; Ngamgbo Ogele Village Square; Onu Ebonyi Play Ground; Aguhuo Primary School; Ngamgbo Agu Oguji; Aguoguji Primary School; Agba Ugama C / School; Onunwafor Akahuhu Play Ground; Onuzo Ezaka Egbu Village Hall; Ngamgbo Nwite Obaji; Ngamgbo Nwite Village Hall; Agu Nwenyi Play Ground; Onungangbo Igwe Play Ground
Ishielu	Iyonu	Aguwenkaya Play Ground; Iyonu Comm. School I; Iyonu Comm. School II; Ogbagu Ezza Comm, School; Obodo Umunyita Comm. School; Obeagu Iyonu
Ishielu	Nkalagu	Amagu Ishiagu Village Hall; Ndiagu Ishiagu Play Ground; Ndiulo Imeoha Village Square; Amanvu Primary School I; Amanvu Primary School II; Akiyi Ato Town Hall; Nzashiogu Village Square; Amanvu Obodo Aja; Ndiulo Uwule; Obodo Ndiagu Agabara; Comm. Secondary School Nkalagu Junction
Ishielu	Nkalaha	Nigercem Nursery School; Umuele Play Ground Hall; Amaeze Agba Government School I; Amaeze Agba Government School II; Umuagu Nkalaha Play Ground; Amokwe Ohuala Play Ground; Obobo Chi Nkalaha Play Ground; Amaeke Okwe Play Ground; Umulesha Village Square
Ishielu	Ntezi	Ntezi Central School I; Ntezi Central School II; Biledeba C/Primary School Premises; Ntezi Orri Comm. School; Ukwakwu Amata Village Square; Oda Bus Stop; Ezza Ezekuna Village Square; Orri Campus Primary School; Ntezi Comm. Secondary School
Ishielu	Obeagu	Ohuali Play Ground; Ekeobeagu Play Ground; Okpuala Obeagu Play Ground; Ogbeje Play Ground; Jioke Obeagu; Ezza Obeagu Comm. School; Egedege Obagu Play Ground; Amogba Obeagu Play Ground; Akpochi Market Square; Ihuzam Play Ground
Ishielu	Ohofia	Okwuanyionu Primary School I; Okwuanyionu Primary School II; Ohofia Comm. Primary School I; Ohofia Comm. Primary School II; Orie Aguedene Market Square I; Orie Aguedene Market Square II; Aguefi State Primary School; Methodist Square Ground; Igwebuike Primary School I; Igwebuike Primary School II
Ishielu	Okpoto	Nkwo Market Stall I; Nkwo Market Stall II; Comm. School Aboyi I; Comm. School Aboyi II; Ukwuachi Comm. Primary School; Afor Market Square; Central School Okpoto; Comm. School Okpoto; Nkwo Igbegbe Market Square; Utam Play Ground
Ishielu	Umuhuali	Azuzuru Primary School Campus II; Azuogbagu Play Ground; Ezza Umuhuali Primary School; Onunwakwo Play Ground I; Onunwakwo Play Ground II; Ameta Play Ground; Azuegu Play Ground; Eke Market Stall; Amokwe Play Ground; Nigercem Parents; Apostolic School; Over Rail; Comm. School Umuhuali; Nigercem Nursery; Amagu Play Ground
Ivo	Akaeze Ukwu	Egbe Umuhuebe Play Ground; Ogboji Play Ground; Amaeze Primary School; Akpu Obeagu Play Ground; Amobala Play Ground; Amuta Play Ground; Obodo Play Ground; Amuror Play Ground; Eziafor Primary School I; Eziafor Primary School II
Ivo	Amaeze Ishiagu	C. P. S Akaeze Ukwu; Umuajali Play Ground; Amiyi Play Ground; Amaeke Play Ground; Orie Ukwu Market Square; Amaogbu Play Ground; Avia Nwachi Market Square; Mgbede C. P. S; Agbaesu Play Ground; Onunkpu-Uko Play Ground
Ivo	Amagu	Akanu Play Ground; Amachi Play Ground; Akpuneke Play Ground; Amanta Play Ground; Amuzu Play Ground; Ishiagu Court Premises; Akparata Ihie Play Ground; Ndieze Ihie Play Ground; Ndiokwor Ihie Play Ground I; Ndiokwor Ihie Play Ground II
Ivo	Amonye	Amaonye Play Ground; Akparata Play Ground; Amaonye Primary School; Egbe Amaonye Play Ground; Ajali Play Ground; Ubeagu Play Ground; Girils Secondary School Ihietutu; Ovie Elugwu Play Ground I; Ovie Elugwu Play Ground II
Ivo	Ihenta Ogidi	C. C. S Akaeze I; C. C. S Akaeze II; Well Play Ground I; Well Play Ground II; Akaeze Court I; Akaeze Court II; Ogidi Market Square I; Ogidi Market Square II
Ivo	Iyioji Akaeze	Ubede Play Ground; Amaevi Play Ground; C. S. P Iyioji; Amumakpa Play Ground; Umulu Market Square; Ndi Play Ground; Amaudara Play Ground; Umuegu Play Ground I; Umuegu Play Ground II
Ivo	Ndiokoro Ukwu	Ndiokoro Ukwu Primary School; Ndiobasi Primary School; Ndiugbugbo Primary School I; Ndiugbugbo Primary School II; Ndiugbugbo Primary School III; Afikpo Road Primary School; Ezza Ekembe Primary School; Egunkpume Play Ground
Ivo	Ngwogwo	Primary School Ngwogwo; Onunkpu Okonkwor Play Ground; Okwor Play Ground; Amokwe Hall; Avia Eru Play Ground; Ihieke Ihuogwu Play Ground; Amaba Play Ground; Obula Play Ground; Amabachi Play Ground
Ivo	Obinagu	Amanta Play Ground; Ovunta Play Ground I; Ovunta Play Ground II; Ihuali Play Ground; Ayaragu Market Square; Iyiokwu Play Ground; Mile II Market Square; Agba Ukwu Play Ground
Ivo	Okue	Okwuazu Okue Play Ground; Okue Hall; Obagu Okue Play Ground; Achi Amachi Play Ground; Amuruo Play Ground; Abada Play Ground; Ndi Okwo Market Square; P. W. D Okofia; Nzerem Play Ground
Ivo	Umobo	Umobo Primary School; Ndiachi Play Ground; Nkwobo Market Square; Ndiajali Play Ground; Eluegu Play Ground I; Eluegu Play Ground II
Izzi	Agbaja Mgbo	Comm. School Ekengbo; Obegungbo Village Square (Health Centre); Community School, Mkpuma; Okaleru Primary School I; Okaleru Primary School II; Obegu Okaleru Square; Okwerike Central Square I; Okwerike Central Square II; Agubata Village Hall; Ndinweze Village Square; Ndiesha Primary School; Ndiachi Village Hall; Ekerigwe Village Hall; Ndioga Village Hall; Ndioga Edukwu Nwafia; Igwekenyim Hall; Isohumiri Primary School; Nwofe Central School I; Nwofe Central School II; Ndiebor Okaleru Village Hall; Obegu Mkpumakpatakpa Village Hall
Izzi	Agbaja Anyanwuigwe	Community Health Centre; Edukwu Okemini; Edukwu Oferekpe; Amachara Central School I; Amachara Central School (C. S II); Edukwuachi Village Hall I; Edukwuachi Village Hall II; Ndiochimba Village Hall; Adum Village Hall; Ndioruta Village Square I; Ndioruta Village Square II; Ekweburu Village Hall; Ndubulofia Village Hall; Ekwe Village Hall; Edukwiachi Town Hall
Izzi	Agbaja Offia Onwe	C. P. S Onuenyim; Offia Onwe Central School; Ishiajim Comm. Pry. School; Akparata Ibina C. S. I; Akparata Ibina II (New Village Square); Izenyi Village Hall; Ndienyiaka Village Hall; Ndiawala Village Square; Onuenyim Central School I; Onuenyim Central School II (Obegu Ogboji); Enyadulogu Village Square; Sudan United Mission Hospital
Izzi	Ezza Inyimagu Igbuhu	Ezzagu Primary School; Ikenyi Primary School; Igbuhu Otuma Primary School; Ndiorogbo Village Square; Agharaozar Village Hall; Omege Village Hall; Okworeka Village Hall; Otsukpuru Village Hall; Ndiachi Village I; Ndiachi Village II; Nkpuma Village Hall; Enyigwe Central School; Ezza Opfu I; Ezza Opfu II; Nwanu Market Square; Ngbede Village Square; Obeagu Ikenyi Village Hall; Azuda Village Hall; Ndioke Village Hall
Izzi	Ezza Inyimagu - Igweledoha	Igweledoha Village Hall; Ndiamadi Community School; Ndinwangba Community School; Obegu Ndinwangba; Ndunwije Village Hall; Ndiokeda Village Hall; Efunagu Village Hall I; Efunagu Village Hall II
Izzi	Ezza Inyimagu - Iziogo	Obegu Ndiogbaga; Iziogo Central School; Offianka Village Hall; Ndiogbaga Obasi Central School; Ugboenyimozar Village Hall; Ndubia Pry. Schl.; Ndinwovu Village Hall; Ndiobokote Village Hall
Izzi	Ezza Inyimagu Ndiagu	Eguefi Village Hall; Enwuagba Village Hall; Ndiatam Oferekpe Village Hall; Ochobuozar Village Hall; Oyege Central School; Ogbagharu Village Hall; Oyege Community School I; Oyege Community School II; Ovuduechi Market Square; Ndiezoke Primary School; Ndinwashimoko Village Square; Ndiepete Village Square
Izzi	Igbeagu Nduogbu	Amuzu Igbeagu Village Hall I; Amuzu Igbeagu Village Hall II; Ndukabi Igbeagu I. C. S.; Ndiogbu Market Sq. Igbeagu; Offiankwu Village Hall; Ododokpa Village Square; Ndinkwuda Primary School; Ndinkwuda Market Square; Igweledoha Primary School; Mbamini Village Hall; Ndidoko Primary Sch.; Ndigwe Primary School; Ndidoko Community Primary School; Special Science Sch. Igbeagu
Izzi	Igbeagu Ndi Ettah	Ndiofutu Village Square; Ndiechi Onuebonyi Primary School; Nchoko Village Square; Oguzoronweya Primary School; Junction Primary School; Ndietta Village; Ndialobo Village Hall; Alibaruhu Village Hall; Oferekpe Primary School I; Oferekpe Primary School II; Okwata Primary School; Ochafu Primary School; Ndiezoke Primary School I; Ndiezoke Primary School II; Achacha Primary School I; Achacha Primary School II; Ndiechi Ndiagu Primary School
Izzi	Igbeagu III	Echindu Pri. Sch. I; Odariko Community School I; Odariko Community School II; Ndiubia Village Square; Ndiakpurata Ndiegu Village Hall; Nwakpu Market Hall; Ogbodo Ndiegu Market Hall; Ndiakpurata Ndiebor; Ojiegbe Primary School; Ogbodo Ndiebor Camp; Ndiekuma Village Square; Echindu Primary School II
Izzi	Mgbalaukwu Inyimagu I	Inyimagu Central School Iboko I; Inyimagu Central School Iboko II; Agbenyim Ndiabor; Obegu Onweonwiya Market Square; Osebi Village Square; Inyirigbada Village Square; Onweonwiya Village Square; Amoda Primary School; Awafia Opefia Village Hall; Ndiedegbe Primary School
Izzi	Mgbalaukwu Inyimagu II	Edenyieka Village Hall; Okpoduma C. S. I; Okpoduma C. S. II; Ominyi Primary School; Ndiwikwe Village Hall; Ndingele Central School School I; Ndingele Central School School II; Ndiogodo Village Hall; Ndiewuogo Village Hall; Nkumoro Village Hall I; Nkumoro Village Hall II; Ezeakataka Village Hall
Izzi	Ndieze Inyimagu Mgbabeluzor	Mgbabeluzor Village Hall; Mkpuma Akwaokuku I; Mkpuma Akwaokuku II; Otam Izekwe Village Hall; Izenyi Community School; Otam Community School I; Otam Community School II; Izaleme Community School; Amachara Indiakam Village Hall; Ophune Village Hall; Olua Market Square
Izzi	Ndieze Inyimagu II Ndiabor Ishiagu	Enyibichiri Village Hall; Mgbabor Village Hall; Ndieze Health Centre; Amagu Enyim C. S; Waka Central School; Ndiozio Market Square; Utsenyim Central School; Nkumoro Central School; Ekebeligwe Village Hall; Izicha Primary School; Court Hall Iboko I; Court Hall Iboko II; Mbam Omeanu; Ndiabor Ishaigu C/S I; Ndiabor Ishaigu C/S II; Ohagelode Village Hall; Ndiogbu Market Square; Offia Okum Village Square; Offia Okum Primary School; Oha Gelode Primary School
Ohaozara	Amaechi Okposi	Isi-Uzor Primary School; Afor-Amenu Market Square; Onu Ezuku Nwakpu Agwu; Akparata Market Square; Amechi Primary School; Umuoka Primary School; Onu Akparata Play Ground; Community Primary School Umunuka; Onu Afor Market Square
Ohaozara	Ene- Na - Ezeraku	Ezuku Ebem Play Ground I; Ezuku Ebem Play Ground II; Nwaenieni Play Ground; Ngamgbo Nwanoke Play Ground; Amene Town Hall; Nweke Ogamgbo
Ohaozara	Mgbom Okposi	Mgbom Central School; Ikwuano Primary School; Okposi Court Premises; Obioha Primary School; Eke Market Square; Akpamaka Play Ground; Enuogurugwu Play Ground; Avia Evuta Square; Ogwe Amaegu; Achioma Play Ground; Obiagu Ezuku Okorie; Onu Ogwu Mebiowa Village Square
Ohaozara	Obiozara	Uburu Central School; Old Market Square; New Market Square; Ishieke Village Square; Upe School Amata; Uburu Customary Court; Obiozara City Commercial School; Umuobasi Hall I; Umuobasi Hall II; Ivuogwu Village Square; Aja Amaeze Market Square
Ohaozara	Okposi Achara	Umuakuma Primary School; Achara Play Ground; Akpamaka Play Ground; Ezuku Agbi Play Ground; Afia Nwegbu Square; Court Area Market Square; Ojigwe Market Square I; Ojigwe Market Square II
Ohaozara	Okposi Okwu	Ezuku Agu Town Hall I; Ezuku Agu Town Hall II; Izuogu Play Ground; Amaji Play Ground; Obodo-Oma Play Ground; Agabenyim Play Ground; Central School Okposi Okwu I; Central School Okposi Okwu II; Akpanu Play Ground; Ovu Offia Play Ground; Ugoni Town Hall; Amoja Town Hall; Enechi Akuma Memo. Pri. Sch.
Ohaozara	Ugbogologo Ugwulangwu	Aja Mgbom Town Hall I; Aja Mgbom Town Hall II; Ezuku Ude Nwarisi; Ezuku Akpamba; Ufuovoke Town Hall; Ezuku Nwoguji; Amenu Town Hall; Ezuku Ezeoke; Ezuku Okoroji; Ezuku Nwonicha
Ohaozara	Uhuotaru Ugwulangwu	Ukwu Egbu; Community Progressive School; Central School Ugwulangwu; Obioha Primary School Ugwulangwu; Enyimmanu Play Ground; Ogamgbo Igwe; Afia Nwezizo; Okefie Play Ground
Ohaozara	Umuchima	Enuagu Primary School; Umuchima Comm. Primary School; Ihenu Comm. Primary School; Ekwesu Play Ground; Ivungwu Square; Afia Nwachi Square; Ogbu Aja Square; Mgbom Square; Enuabor Market Square; Ezuku Ofor Ovor Play Ground
Ohaozara	Umunaga	Umunaga Primary School I; Umunaga Primary School II; Eke Market Square; Amagana Square I; Amagana Square II; Aja Urobo Square; Akpu Agwu Village Square; Ezuku Okoro Village Square; Ezuku Alfred Village Square; Enuokwe Play Ground; Akawo Enuagu Village Square; Awanaka Square; Onuofukwuru Market Square; Onu - Esu - Agu Urobo Farm Settlement
Ohaozara	Umuobuna	Umuobuna Primary School; Isiogu Play Ground; Amaechi Square; Mkpuma Udene Square; Umungwuoke Square; Karakaba Primary School; Enuibe Play Ground; Agu Ogwu Farm Sett; Ezuku Ekpa Mba; P. J. H Premises
Ohaukwu	Effium I	Amainyima Play Ground; Comm. Central School Effiumi; Central School Akparata; Akparata Play Ground; Okporo Forest School; Ohage Village Square Effium
Ohaukwu	Effium II	Ngangbo Ukoro Play Ground; Okpobasi Play Ground; Umuezeokaoha State School; Comm. Central School Effium; Ibenda Primary School Effium; Nweke Ndiagu Umuezeokaoha; Effium Sub-Office Hall I; Effium Sub-Office Hall II; Azuedene Play Ground; Amuda Comm. Primary School; Ngangbo Ohagolode Play Ground (Booth 1); Ngangbo Ohagolode Play Ground (Booth 11)
Ohaukwu	Ezzamgbo	Nwafia Ufieoboto Mkt. Square; Ndiagu Play Ground Ezzangbo; Central School Ezzangbo; Umuebe Play Ground; Okpufu Play Ground; Nsulakpa Primary School; Practising Pri. School Ezzangbo; Nkwo Market Square; Nkpor Uvuru Play Ground; Umueze Play Ground; Unity Pri. School Amaovu
Ohaukwu	Ishi Ngbo I	Ejirike Pri. School Ekwassi; Ndiagueni Play Ground; Ndiaguidaka Pri. Sch.
Ohaukwu	Ishi Ngbo II	Ndulo Ukwuagba Play Ground Booth I; Ndulo Ukwuagba Play Ground Booth II; Ndulo Ukwuagba Play Ground Booth III; Ndiagu Akpurata Pri. School; Ohabuike Pri. Sch. Hall I; Ohabuike Pri. Sch. Hall II; Aguachi State Pri. Sch. Hall I; Aguachi State Pri. Sch. Hall II; Ndiagueze Play Ground; Ejilewe Play Ground
Ohaukwu	Ngbo	Obodo Ndiede Play Ground; Ndulo Umuezeaka Play Ground; Otuokpeye Pri. Sch. Amoffia; Central School Obodoeje Hall I; Central School Obodoeje Hall II; Hill Top Pri. Sch. Abarigwe; Umunnakwe Pri. Sch. Abarigwe; Pri. Sch. Akpagu Amoffia Hall I; Pri. Sch. Akpagu Amoffia Hall I I; Pri. Sch. Ndiagu Utobo
Ohaukwu	Okposhi I	Central School Ngbo Hall I; Central School Ngbo Hall II; Ndiaguigube Pri. School; Odeatang Central School I; Odeatang Central School II; Enyibchiri Play Ground Booth I; Enyibchiri Play Ground Booth II; Obodo Ajim Play Ground
Ohaukwu	Okposhi II	Amaffia Comm. School; Comm. Primary School Igweledeoha Hall I; Comm. Primary School Igweledeoha Hall II; Comm. Primary School Ndiagu Ngbo; Ndiaguoge Play Ground Booth I; Ndiaguoge Play Ground Booth II; Comm. Primary School Inyimagu Hall I; Comm. Primary School Inyimagu Hall II; Ndulo Amaffia Play Ground; Efutuekwe Play Ground
Ohaukwu	Umuagara / Amechi	Amechi Comm. School; Obodoakara Play Ground; Obodondiagueshi Play Ground; Nworie Ndiagu Market Square; Umuoru Primary School; Amaechi Ndiagueshi Primary School; Royal Comprehensive School; Umuagara Comm. Primary School Ezzangbo; Obodo Ndiaguinyi Play Ground; Amanta Comm. Primary School; Oshiewolo Primary School; Eguechara Play Ground
Ohaukwu	Umu Ogudu Oshia	Ukpeshi Primary School Ndulo; Central School Ndiagu Udu; Central School Okorogbata Hall I; Central School Okorogbata Hall II; Comm. Primary School Egwegwe Hall I; Comm. Primary School Egwegwe Hall II; Oshia Ngbo Central School Hall I; Oshia Ngbo Central School Hall II; Ogum Ngbo Comm. Primary School Hall I; Ogum Ngbo Comm. Primary School Hall II; Abarigwe Pri. School; Ogene Play Ground; Obodo Umuinyi Play Ground; Ogwuduanno Play Ground
Ohaukwu	Umu Ogudu Akpu I	Nwafia Obodo Ogbaeni Booth I; Akwarama Pri. Sch.( Nwaffia Obodo Ogbaeni Booth I); Obodo Offiru Play Ground (Nwaffia Obodo Ogbaeni Booth II); Central School Umuoguduakpu Hall I; Central School Umuoguduakpu Hall II; Ndiaguona Play Ground Booth I; Ndiaguona Play Ground Booth II; Nwaobodougba Play Ground; Aguebele Umuimama Play Ground Booth I; Aguebele Umuimama Play Ground Booth II; Oshiaguama Play Ground; Ndulo Umuoguduakpu Play Ground
Ohaukwu	Umu Ogudu Akpu II	Ijinike High School Umuoguduakpu Hall I; Ijinike High School Umuoguduakpu Hall II; Nwiniyi Market Square Booth I; Nwiniyi Market Square Booth II; State School Oriaja Hall I; State School Oriaja Hall II; Nwafia Ndiagu Orie Mkt. Sq. I; Nwafia Ndiagu Orie Mkt. Sq. II; Comm. School Umuogudu Hall I; Comm. School Umuogudu Hall II
Ohaukwu	Wigbeke I	Inyafor Village Square Booth I; Inyafor Village Square Booth II; Ekpitom Village Square Booth I; Ekpitom Village Square Booth II
Ohaukwu	Wigbeke II	Umuezeoka Central School Inikiri Hall I; Umuezeoka Central School Inikiri Hall II; Inikiri Bernard Market Square Booth I; Inikiri Bernard Market Square Booth II; Ugoeze Primary School; Ameka / Amajim Primary School; Onuebeja Primary School; Umueze Primary School Hall I; Umueze Primary School Hall II; Igwebuike Primary School; Onueroro Market Square
Ohaukwu	Wigbeke III	Uffiacha Village Square Booth I; Uffiacha Village Square Booth II; Ogbagere Village Square Booth I; Ogbagere Village Square Booth II
Onicha	Abaomege	Ishieke Play Ground; Ugbonna Play Ground; Ebualike Play Ground; Anumocha Play Ground; Central School Abaomege; Osusara Play Ground; Ndufu Play Ground I; Ndufu Play Ground II; Okaria Play Ground
Onicha	Agbabor-Isu	Agbabor C. P. S; Ngwu Umuigbo Play Ground; Eziukwu Chukwu Play Ground; Obunor Play Ground; Ihu-Ani Play Ground; Nweke Agu Play Ground; Ufuoba Play Ground Ufuoba; Ukwuoji Ameke Play Ground; Nwachi Play Ground; Umunna Play Ground; Achi Uzam Market Square; Orie Uhu Oge; Onu-Unor Eche Play Ground; Nwankwor Omege Play Ground; Nweke Oke Play Ground; Agueke Primary School
Onicha	Amanator-Isu	Ekenu Village Square; Ihuezeukwu Play Ground; Nworie Odi Market Square; Ukwu-Ube Play Ground; Umu Okpara Play Ground I; Umu Okpara Play Ground II; Isiata Hall; Primary School Mgbom; Isuachara Primary School; Afia Nwezor; Ukwu Nwangwu; Ezukwu Nhirine Play Ground; Akpu Obasi Play Ground; Afor Market Square; Umuoyida Play Ground; Umuchima Village Hall; Eziukwu Ogbu Ani Play Ground I; Eziukwu Ogbu Ani Play Ground II; Ofia Okpu Market Square
Onicha	Ebia Oshiri	Ukwu Ube Square I; Ukwu Ube Square II; Akpuru Nduvu Village Square; Health Centre I; Okokwu Village Square
Onicha	Enuagu-Onicha	Ugwuenu Primary School; Ube Ewa Ugwu Play Ground; Ufueze Ugwu Town Hall; Amautu Town Hall; Onueziukwu Anoke Ogbu; Anike Town Hall; Anike Primary School; Otika Town Hall I; Otika Town Hall II; Enuagu Primary School; Isiama Town Hall; Amankwo Town Hall; Ogboedere Town Hall; Ezekporoke Town Hall; Orie Asumkpa Town Hall; Ogbunna Play Ground; Ugwu Odida Bore Hole Square; Ugwu Odida Ukwu Primary School; Isiama Primary School
Onicha	Isinkwo-Ukawu	Ngamgbo Inyima; Amofia Play Ground; Onuzor Nwonuma; Ngamgbo Anyarigwe`; Nworie Onuzor Eze I; Nworie Onuzor Eze II; Onunwankwo Ugo; Onunworie Ohofia; Ngamgbo Akahufu; Ngamgbo Egugwu; Onunweke Market Square
Onicha	Isi-Onicha	Akanu Primary School; Eziga Primary School; Ogudu Onu Play Ground; Ezebe Play Ground; Old Nworie Umubo Market Square; Amanator C. P School; Onueziukwu Njoku-Nama Play Ground
Onicha	Obeagu-Isu	Umuarisi Play Ground; Afor Agu Market Square; Umuekwenze Play Ground; Umuanagu Play Ground; Nkwor Okoro Market Square; Ojiegbe Primary School; Agueke Obeagu Play Ground
Onicha	Oguduokwo Oshiri	Central School Oshiri; Ufuezeokwu Square I; Ufuezeokwu Square II; Ogudu Okwo Village Square I; Ogudu Okwo Village Square II; Nwafor Market Square; Obeagu / Amoffia Hall I; Obeagu / Amoffia Hall II
Onicha	Okuzu-Ukawu	Ngamgbo Ukawu P/Ground; Nwankwo Market Square; Ndiagu Village Square I; Ndiagu Village Square II; Ngambgo Ndiagu Playground; Nworie Market Square; Okuzu Village Square; Ishieke Play Ground; Ebiaji Play Ground; Azu Obosi Village Square; Okuzu Ukawu C/S Amankpuma
Onicha	Ugwu-Oshiri	Ezechi Town Hall; Ugwu Comm. Primary School I; Ugwu Comm. Primary School II; Nwube Village Square; Achi Elom Square; Mboji Uzu Square; Amankalu Play Ground; Ishinkwo Play Ground; Ugwu Comm. Primary School III
Onicha	Umudomi-Onicha	Amakporo Primary School; Nweke Ojionu Market Square; Afor Umudomi Market Square; Ofiere Play Ground; Ngwu Amangwu; Ngwu Ofuogene; Oja Play Ground; Ngwu Amaokwe; Okeani Play Ground
