= Orring =

Ethnic group in southeastern and central Nigeria

Orring people
Órring, Oring
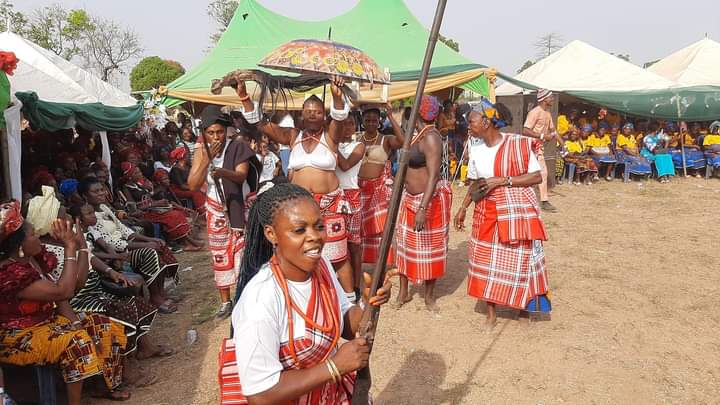
- Orring people of Ebonyi state during the annual Orring Day 2022 in Amuda, Ebonyi state

Total population
- About 4-10 million

Regions with significant populations
- Ebonyi, Benue, Cross River States.

Languages
- Korring, Igbo (As a L2 in Ebonyi)

Religion
- Christianity, Animism, African Traditional Religion, Islam

Related ethnic groups
- Igboid; (Ezza, Izzi, Ikwo and Mgbo), Idoma, Mbembe, Bahumono, Ikom, Ekoi

The Orring people (also called Orri or Oring) are an ethnolinguistic group in southeastern and central Nigeria with communities in Ebonyi, Cross River and Benue states. They speak the Korring language.

== Origin and history ==
The origin of the Orring people is unclear, some speculate that they migrated from the Kwararafa kingdom. The Orring consider themselves descendants of Lukpata Akpa, their ancestral progenitor, and a proto-branch of the Akpato (Okpoto) people. From their ancestral homeland, Orring groups expanded southeastward into forested areas. One historic migration, led by Okum (Okun), established settlements at Ntezi-Aba, in present-day Abakaliki.

The Orring were historically referred to themselves as the WanOkun and were governed by a centralized monarchy with the title of Ede olun It is believed the Orrings were once settled in contiguous territories, including those of the Ba'kelle, Uffia, and Ba'humono, before being separated. They dwelled alongside their neighbors-the Mbembe and Ekoi communities, while interacting with the Kwararafa kingdom, Aro Confederacy and Igala Kingdom.

The Orring are believed to be the aboriginal settlers of much of northern Ebonyi and Abakaliki prior to the coming of the Igbos. Scholars such as C.C Ugoh in his book Gods of Abakaliki stated that the Orring people settled in Abakaliki territory prior to the coming of the four major Igbo groups of Ezza, Izzi, Ikwo and Ngbo. In colonial intelligence reports, A. E. Cook noted that the Orring once held vast Abakaliki lands, which diminished with the arrival of later settlers. The Orring accommodated and intermarried with the Igbo and created a hybrid culture. By the time the British set up their administration in the hinterlands, five of the original seven Orring communities had almost been assimilated by the Igbo. The misrepresentation of the Orring as a conquered or assimilated people has been refuted by scholars such as P.J. Ezeh (2007), who argues that the Orring were not assimilated but rather assimilated others into their sociocultural fold in means of increasing their population. We can deduce from Ezeh’s emphasizes, that a genuinely assimilated group would have lost its language, identity, and political autonomy; features which the Orring communities have continued to retain, sustain, project, document and revitalize, even the smallest Orring community of the Okpolo (Okpomoro) has retained much of their heritage, including the Korring language. Other instances are; the centralized political system, headed by the Ede-Olung (god-king), with a council of titled chiefs (Gbale-Otum), and a well-structured household hierarchy led by the Ede (Inaji) (eldest male), further attests to the internal coherence and continuity of Orring society. The spirituality, taboo and aspect of belief trajectories of the Orring people is only unique because it distinguished in practices in which the Ede Olung, then the chief priest rank the highest authority, however it reflects a generalized approach that is known amongst many African societies. The beliefs and recognition of the Ede-Ede (ancestors) as spiritual guardians of their clans and connection between the spiritual and material world is also imminent. Regardless, the Orring continued to maintain their roots, culture and language.

== Distribution ==
The Orring people are grouped into three separate groups within three states in Nigeria. In Benue, are the Ufia and the Orring-Idelle communities, found in both Aro and Oju LGAs; Ukelle, Bahumono, Agwagwune, Umon, Akwunakwuna, and other linguistic relatives of the Orring people in both northern and central Cross River state. In Ebonyi, Orring communities are found in Ishielu, Ohaukwu and Ezza North local government areas consisting of Amuda (Idzem), Ntezi (Eteji), Okpoto (Lame), Effium (Uffiom), and Okpolo (Okpomoro). Researchers and scholars of Orring history are further exploring other linguistic groups with the language groups, methods in which they utilized in discovering other Korring speaking groups in both Nigeria and Cameron.

== Language ==
The Orring traditionally speak the Korring language (also called Korri). in Eteji (Ntezi), the dialect is K'eteji, while Lame (Okpoto) speak Ki'lame, Idzem (Amuda) speak K'idzem, Okpolo (Opkomoro) speak K'okpolo, Uffium (Effium) speak K'uffium in Ebonyi State. Ufia (Utonkon) in Benue State speak K'ufia. Ukelle, in Cross River State, speak K'ukelle. Korring belongs to the Benue–Congo subgroup of Niger–Benue Language family. Korring is a semi-Bantiod language that shares linguistical relationships with Ekoid languages of north/central Cross River state. It is also spoken in southern Benue state Nigeria, and there has been claims of native speakers of Korring found in Nassarawa, Adamawa and Taraba states. Some researcher also claim evidence of the language in southwest settlements in Cameron. The Korring dialects spoken in Ebonyi state appears to be bilingual, accommodating much of Igbo features into the language, much of factors that affect aboriginal tongues when it separates from the mother language. To this extent, some scholars have classified Korring as a beach of the language Igbo language due to its present similarities in certain vocabularies. Contrary to this claims, empirical Orring scholars such as Ezeh and Nkamigbo contested the claims adopting the glottochronological method, and lexicostal approaches of linguistic studies to argue that Orring is indigenous, and most senior in the Abakaliki region, hence when integrated, should have been seen as the first born of the present Abakaliki group. The residential seniority of the Orring in Ebonyi state, is furthermore proven in the historical records of scholars sourced from oral traditions of these host communities, claiming to have forest met the Orring already established in Abakaliki during the period of their migration into the region.

During the colonial period, British missionaries in favored the use of Anambra Igbo as the language of worship and education in the then Abakaliki province. Indigenous teachers came from elsewhere such as Onitsha and Old Korring names were often replaced by Igbo-Christian names. This policy contributed to the diminishing of Orring linguistic and cultural identity. As a result, many Orring people, especially in Ebonyi, today speak both Korring and Igbo.

== Culture ==
The Orring people are also known to be skilled craftsmen, with basket-making being a notable occupation among people. In Ntezi, nearly every household has a basket-making setup and the practice is so widespread that in neighboring towns many baskets originate there. Aside from farming and agriculture, trading is another important economic activity.

The Orring celebrates numerous occasions year-round. Festivals and cultural gatherings continue to affirm their kinship ties and inter-community cooperation across state boundaries. The Oviode festival, Ntezi's primary cultural gathering takes place annually during the first new moon of February. It is a very important celebration observed by all the five villages of Ntezi. The community convenes to commemorate their shared history, showcase their arts, and offering gratitude to god and their ancestors. It usually takes place after the five villages have concluded their own individual festivals.

The Orrings also have Orring Day, held annually late in the year (usually in Ntezi) where all the clans gather to celebrate and preserve their language and culture.

== See also ==
- Ebonyi State
- Ukelle people
- Igbo people
