= Igbo–Igala wars =

The Igbo-Igala wars
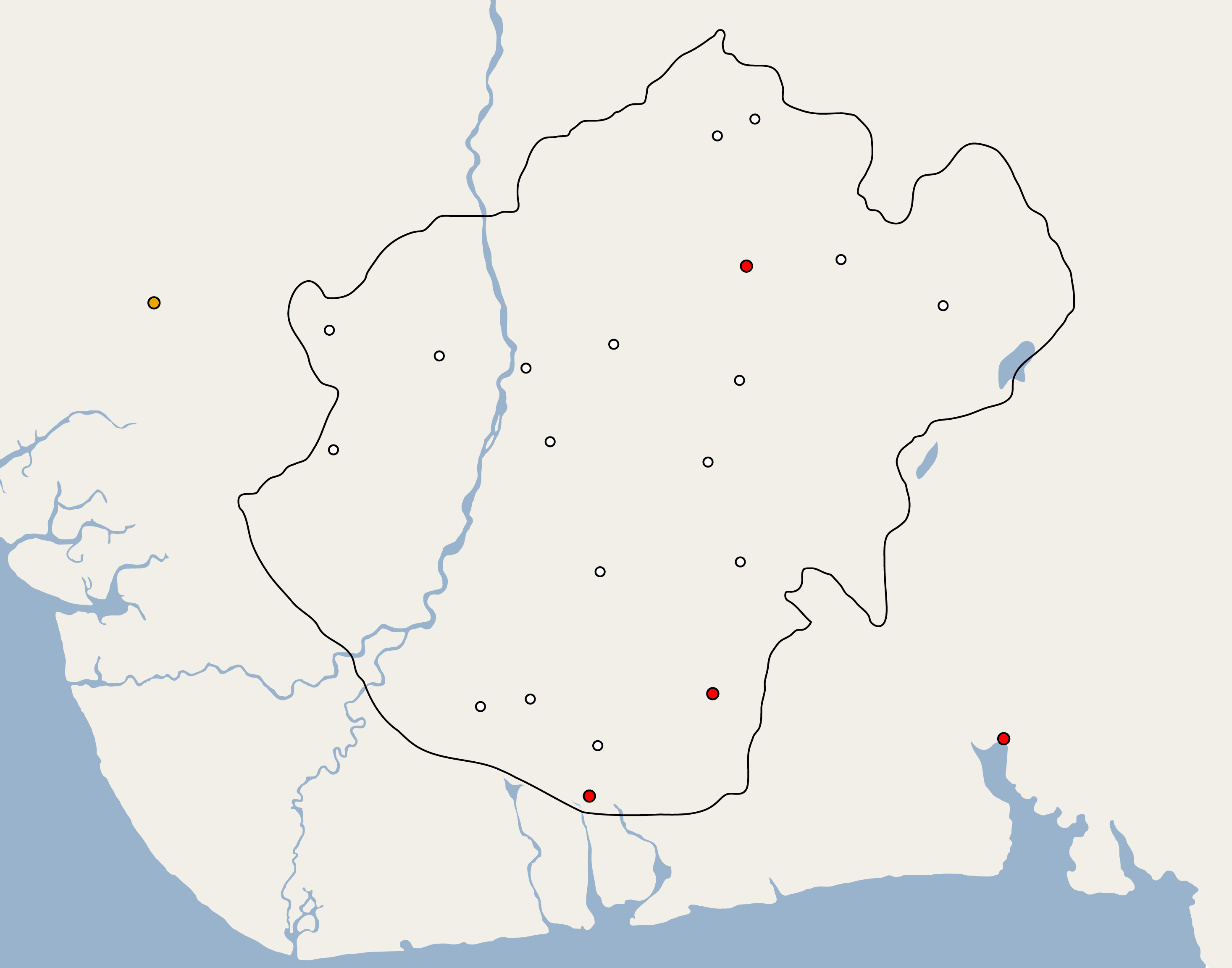
Date	18th - 19th century
Location	Southeastern Nigeria
Result	Battle over Nsukka. Minor Igala influences in certain Western Igbo areas, Nsukka Conquered by Aguleri the group of Igbo warriors, Ezza conquers multiple Igala areas, Igbo Influence on Igala in Igboland

Belligerents
Nsukka; Anioma; Aguleri	Igala Kingdom

Commanders and leaders
Eze Of Nsukka Obi of Onitsha Igwe of Aguleri	Onọjọ Ogboni

The Igbo–Igala wars were a series of conflicts involving the Igala and the Igbo in the 18th-19th centuries. Both the Igbos and Igalas fought wars at a communal levels with each community recognizing their independence and boundaries. Igalas and Northern Igbos were neighbors whose interactions influenced the religious practices of both sides.

== Background ==
In the 16th century a large Igala migration occurred across the Niger river following a defeat to the Kingdom of Benin. Shortly after, a Jukun migration from Wukari conquered and established a royal dynasty in Idah, bringing them into contact with Igbo speaking groups.

== Battle of Nsukka ==
The Nsukka-Igala wars occurred in the 18th to 19th century following. Contemporary sources on this battle is often scarce. Most tales of Igbo-Igala relations being 20th century revisionist works. With arguably the only contemporary source being Joseph Hawkins. Hawkins narrates a failed igala invasion of somewhere in Ebo(Igboland)believed to be around Nsukka.

=== The battle ===
Hawkins narrates how Nsukka was invaded by an Igala king. The battle started by a "discharge of arrows" by the Igalas which was returned to by the opposing Igbo army. Following a charge made by the Igala king, it would lead to an alliance of two Igbo clans. The result was a defeat of the Igala people during the invasion. The battle ultimately ended in an Igala loss, and 700 Igalas taken as slaves.

=== Nsukka ===
Nsukka people have continuously inhabited northern Igboland since the 3rd millennium BCE as shown through archeological continuity and glottochrony. They are considered to be one of the first Igbo subgroups by historian and archeologist Edwin Eme Okafor. During the period of the Igbo-Igala Wars, marked by a scarcity of labor and insecurity resulting from slave raiding and the Nsukka-Igala conflicts, notable changes occurred in the iron smelting practices of the Nsukka people. Due to urgency, some iron smelters resorted to using wood directly in their smelting process, bypassing the usual practice of burning it to produce charcoal. This adaptation in smelting techniques demonstrates the impact of the war on the traditional methods employed by the Nsukka community, as they incorporated wood into their process to sustain their iron production amidst the challenging conditions.

The conflicts started with the arrival of Onọjọ Ogboni, a legendary Igala general said to have been a giant in stature, who was the son of an Igbo hunter, Abatamu of Ogurugu, and Obudali, a princess of the Igala kingdom. One of the 18th century conflicts was the Battle of Nsukka in 1794, which resulted in a Nsukka military victory, however with significant losses including the Eze's eldest son, and three of his wives. The battle was witnessed by Sailor, Joseph B. Hawkins.

== Ebonyi conquest ==
=== Lead up ===
Prior to the 19th century , the NorthEastern Igbo subgroups located in Ebonyi State underwent a significant northward migration towards the Cross River areas, this in turn manifested to boundary disputes due to mercenarial agreement breach between several Eastern Igbo groups with her neighbours such resulted to clash between;

- Ikwo-Nsobo and Osopo of Cross River State
- Izzi – Osopo and Yala of Cross River State
- Mgbo-Igala of Benue State
- Ezza and Orri
- Ezza and Igala

A similar migration skirmish towards Abia State in the 17th century established the Aro Confederacy. As the Ezza, Izzi, Ikwo subgroups moved northward, all who are said to descend from siblings whose patriarch hailed from epicenter between Onueke and Afikpo cultural areas, the Ezza encountered the indigenous Orring people and interrelationship with them led to Ezza settlement and farming rights. The Ikwo people encountered the Okum who are said to be Orring group. After series of inter-tribal wars that lead to the defeat of Okum as a result of empowering them in number, the remnants were further assimilated. Okum do not exist as an identifiable group anymore but there is archeological and cultural proof of their existence, as there are non-Igbo dances and masquerades in modern Ikwo culture. The southern Ikwo displaced the indigenous Adadama group far to modern Cross River State.

=== Conflict with Igala ===
As the Igala already lived in the area with the Orri they sought friendship with the Ezza and gave them land for farming. However, betrayed by the Ezza whose true intent was expansion and to address their ongoing land scarcity. It led to a conflict between the two groups, resulting in the Igala's defeat and expulsion from their occupied territory which the Ezza then took control of. The Agba community, located in Ebo Ndiagu, Ochuhu Agba, and Orie Agba Elu, faced defeat as the Ezza's territory expanded. Some rallied, but despite putting up a spirited but brief defense, the Agba were compelled to retreat southwards, leaving their abandoned lands to be later settled by Umunwagu and Ikwuate (Idembia). Seeking safety and security, the Agba people sought refuge in Ishielu Division, departing from their original mainland settlements. The Ezza met them again in 1850 and again conquered and displaced the remnants, naming the new territory Ezzagu.

== Western Igbo influence ==
The Western Igbo people consist of the Anioma people of Delta State and the fluvial side of Anambra state. While specific conflicts with the Enuani and Igala people remain poorly documented, there is one Igala-speaking community in Enuaniland known as Ebu. The Idah Kingdom conquered some significant riverine trading centers, But just as quickly as they were conquered, most came under control of the more powerful Kingdom of Aboh, an Anioma kingdom, while the others were significant trading partners to both kingdoms, supplying the entirety of palm oil Aboh traded. Although some Igala dances continue to be performed in Anioma, there is no evidence of any lasting military conquests; instead, it appears that cultural traditions were exchanged mostly through trade and interactions between the neighboring communities.
