= Lengue =

Lengue may refer to:

- Lengue people, an African ethnic group who are indigenous to Equatorial Guinea and Gabon
- Lengue language, a Bantu language spoken by the Lengue people
- Lengue (film), a 1985 Central African short documentary film directed by Léonie Yangba Zowe
- Afzelia africana, a species of wood
