= Ukelle people (Nigeria) =

The Ukelle people (Ba'kelle) make up roughly half of the population of the Yala Local Government Area in Cross River State, Nigeria. The language of the Ukelle people is Kukelle belonging to the Kukelle-Korring language family.

The major groups among the Ukelle are:

- North Ukelle in Cross River State: The subgroups here are Wanihem (including Wanibolor), Wanikade (including Uzenyi), Wanokom (including Otikili) and Uzekwe (including Okom).
- South Ukelle in Cross River State: Subgroups are Uzilagar (Ijiraga), Uzikatom, Uzokom (Ujokom) and Otiligom (Ntrigom).

Ba'kelle are closely related to:

- Orring people of Effium (Uffium), Ntezi (Eteji), Amuda (Idzem) and Okpoto in Ebonyi State.
- Utonkon (also known as Uffia or Wanffia) in Benue State.

== Language ==
Kukelle, the language of Ukelle people is grouped by some authorities as belonging to the Benue–Congo sub group of African Languages. However, E. Alagoa in Groundwork of Nigerian History further stated that Ukelle people who speak one of the Cross River languages.

The Lutheran Church of Nigeria, through its Literature Centre in Wanikade, translated the New Testament of the Bible into Kukelle in 1979 using a Latin script.

== History ==
The history of Ukelle is still sketchy. Some argue that their ancestors moved downwards from Benue state, others contend that the ancestors may have moved from the Igbo country, displaced by the arrival of the Igbos. Ukelle people share sociocultural similarities with the neighbouring Igede people of Benue state and Yala people of Cross River state. Major ceremonies such as marriage, burials and dances bear striking resemblances. Ukelle people refer to Yala people as Ollah, Igede people as Ollah-ewoh and the Idoma people of Benue state as Ollah-akpoto.

== Location ==
The primary Ukelle region is bounded in the north by the Igede people of Benue state, in the south and west by the Izzi people of Ebonyi State and in the east by the Yala and Yatche people of Cross River State. Much of Ukelle land in Cross River State is agrarian. However, development and urbanisation are coming into Ukelle. The provision of electricity in north Ukelle and the construction of bridges into the hinterlands of Ukelle are signs of urbanisation. Yam (various species), cassava, rice and domesticated animals are the primary agricultural products of the Ukelle people.

== Government and culture ==
In the Ukelle region, the day-to-day Government authority at the local level resides in the village assembly (called ojilla). The village assembly is made up of the king or one or more chiefs, the elders and the youths. In earlier times, a typical Ukelle community had a village square, with the ojilla at its center. Until any settlement of Ukelle people makes an ojilla, they are considered an appendage of the nearest community with an ojilla. In fact, the term ojilla is used interchangeably to refer to the village, its square or the village assembly.

A group of villages make up a clan (called an essam). For example, in Wanikade, there are three essam: Ogumogum, Otuka and Opuolom respectively. Traditionally, disputes within each village are adjudicated by the assembly, while disputes between villages within a clan are settled by the assembly of the clan. Disputes between villages in more than one essam as well as matters such as capital punishment, economic use of trees, the forest, rivers etc. are resolved at the general assembly called lutse. The king (ubet) or chief (uyini) wields ceremonial power rather than political power.

Burial ceremonies (kulu) for deceased persons in Ukelle is the traditional responsibility of the family and of the village.

The Ukelle people are linked to the constitutional government by six wards of Yala local government, namely Ijiraga, Njrigom, Wanokom, Wanikade and Wanihem. Ukelle also has a representative in the Cross River State House of Assembly.

== Festivals ==
The Ukelle people celebrate several festivals, the most prominent of which is the New Yam festival (likpee) which is celebrated to mark the beginning of the harvest season. Before likpee, minor harvest of biannual crops and vegetables may take place as well as harvest of small farms close to homes.

== Conflicts ==
The last two decades have seen an upsurge in violent conflicts over land and resources involving the Ukelle. Notable conflicts include the Ukelle - Izzi crisis and Wanihem - Wanikade conflict. Increased conflicts may be related to the increasing resource requirements of a growing population. The absence of substantial military or police forces within the Ukelle homeland have been identified as contributing factors which the Cross River State government has tried to address. In addition the National Boundary Commission has failed to properly demarcate the appropriate boundaries.
