= Ntezi-Aba =

Village in Ebonyi State, Nigeria

- Town
- Location within Nigeria
- Country: Nigeria

Ntezi-Aba is a village in Abakaliki, the Ebonyi State Capital. It is located at the capital city of Abakaliki, and listed as a town under the Ebonyi local government area of Ebonyi State. The town is situated near Obiagu and Ofe-Iyiokwu villages of Izzi clan. Ntezi-Aba is presently inhabited by the Igbo subgroup of Izzi. However the town is as old as Abakaliki itself, tracing its origin back to the Orring people, a western Bantu speaking people found in Ebonyi, Benue and Cross River states. Oral sources and some written materials have it that the town was founded and inhabited by the Orring people prior to the coming of the present settlers.

== History ==
Igbo oral history has it that the Igbo people began migration from Nri to their various communities and settlements. C C. Ugoh's book "The gods of Abakaliki" mentioned that the Orring people are the aboriginal settlers of Abakaliki prior to the coming of the Igbo clans of Ezza, Izzi, Ikwo and Ngbo. Patrick Aleke also mentioned that the Orring people are the first settlers of Abakaliki, and had settled in Ntezi-Aba before their relocation to their present settlements. Linda Chinelo Nkamigbo in her lexical study of the similarities and extent of linguistic borrowings between Korring and Igbo languages of Abakaliki wrote that:

"Talbot (1969) claimed that the Oring were the first to settle in the area where they now cohabit with the Igbo in southeastern Nigeria. He went further to assert that the Igbo might have joined the Oring later but being greater in number, they subdued the Oring through constant fights. This compelled some of the Oring to look for new settlements farther north and farther south with non-Igbo ethnic groups as neighbours."

Quoting Eze (2007), she concluded that

"it is not in doubt that Koring borrowed extensively from Igbo Some lexical items examined for this present study have been observed to exist in Igbo neighbouring languages such as Yoruba but not in Koring neighbouring languages. It is therefore pertinent to state that the recipient language speakers are the original settlers of the land while the donor language speakers arrived later."

This asymmetrical relationship amongst the Abakaliki people has continued to create a unique sociocultural lifestyle of the people. In addition, Abakaliki centred historical books such as the "Ikwo man in his environment," "Ngbolizhia," "Ezza People," "Amuda People," amongst others literally featured the Orring people as the aboriginal settlers of their various settlements prior to their migration and settlements based on their various oral history. To this extent, the Orring people both those in Benue and Cross River states have in most versions of their histories, traced their origins to Abakaliki, holding that they were all settling in Ntezi-Aba after the decline of the Kwararafa empire and the Korring (Okpoto; Akpato) empire, and prior to the various historical factors that is concerned with their presence settlements.
