= Kele people =

Kele people may refer to:

- Kele people (Congo), a Bantu ethnic group
- Kele people (Gabon)
- Kele people (Nigeria), a Cross River ethnic group
