= Kota language (Gabon) =

Language of Gabon

Kota
- iKota
- Native to: Gabon, Republic of the Congo
- Native speakers: (34,000 cited 2000–2007)
- Language family: Niger–Congo?: Atlantic–Congo; Benue–Congo; Bantoid; Bantu (Zone B); Kele (b. 20); Kota

Language codes
- ISO 639-3: koq
- Glottolog: kota1274
- Guthrie code: B.25
- ELP: Kota (Gabon)

Kota, or iKota, is a Bantu language spoken by the Bakota people. It is spoken in northeastern Gabon, Ogooué-Ivindo Province and in some areas of Republic of Congo. According to Ethnologue there are 34,442 Kota speakers in Gabon and 9,055 in the Republic of Congo.

Kota includes several dialects, which include: Ndambomo, Mahongwe, Ikota-la-hua, Sake, Menzambi, Bougom.

== Phonology ==
Consonants
	Labial	Alveolar	Palatal	Velar	Glottal
Plosive	p b	t d	tʃ dʒ	k	
Prenasalized	ᵐp ᵐb	ⁿd		ᵑg	
Fricative	f	s z			h
Nasal	m	n	ɲ		
Approximant	w	l	j		

Vowels
	Front	Central	Back
High	i iː		u uː
Mid-high	e eː		o oː
Mid-low	ɛ ɛː		ɔ ɔ̃ ɔː
Low		a ã aː	

Kota also has two tones; high and low.
