= Balengue =

Balengue may refer to:

- Lengue people, an African ethnic group who are indigenous to Equatorial Guinea and Gabon
- Lengue language, a Bantu language spoken by the Lengue people
