= WUM (disambiguation) =

WUM, Wum or wum may refer to:

- Wum, a town and commune in Cameroon
- Wumbvu language, the ISO 639-3 code
- The Women University Multan, a public University in Multan, Pakistan
- Medical University of Warsaw, a medical school in Poland
