= Mbangwe language =

Bantu language

Mbangwe
- Mbaŋwe
- Native to: Gabon, Congo
- Native speakers: (ca. 3,500 cited 2000–2007)
- Language family: Niger–Congo?: Atlantic–Congo; Benue–Congo; Bantoid; Bantu (Zone B); Kele (b. 20); Mbangwe

Language codes
- ISO 639-3: zmn
- Glottolog: mban1268
- Guthrie code: B.23

Mbangwe (Mbaŋwe, Mbahouin) is a Bantu language spoken in Gabon and the Congo.
