= Amuda people =

Ethnolinguistic group in Ebonyi, Nigeria

The Amuda people, also known as the Idzem people, are a subgroup of the Orring ethnic group in the southeastern Nigeria state of Ebonyi. It includes four major clans: Ojolokpa, Buolung, Buora and Anmosho. The Amuda people are found predominantly in the Ezza North and Ohaukwu Local Government Areas.

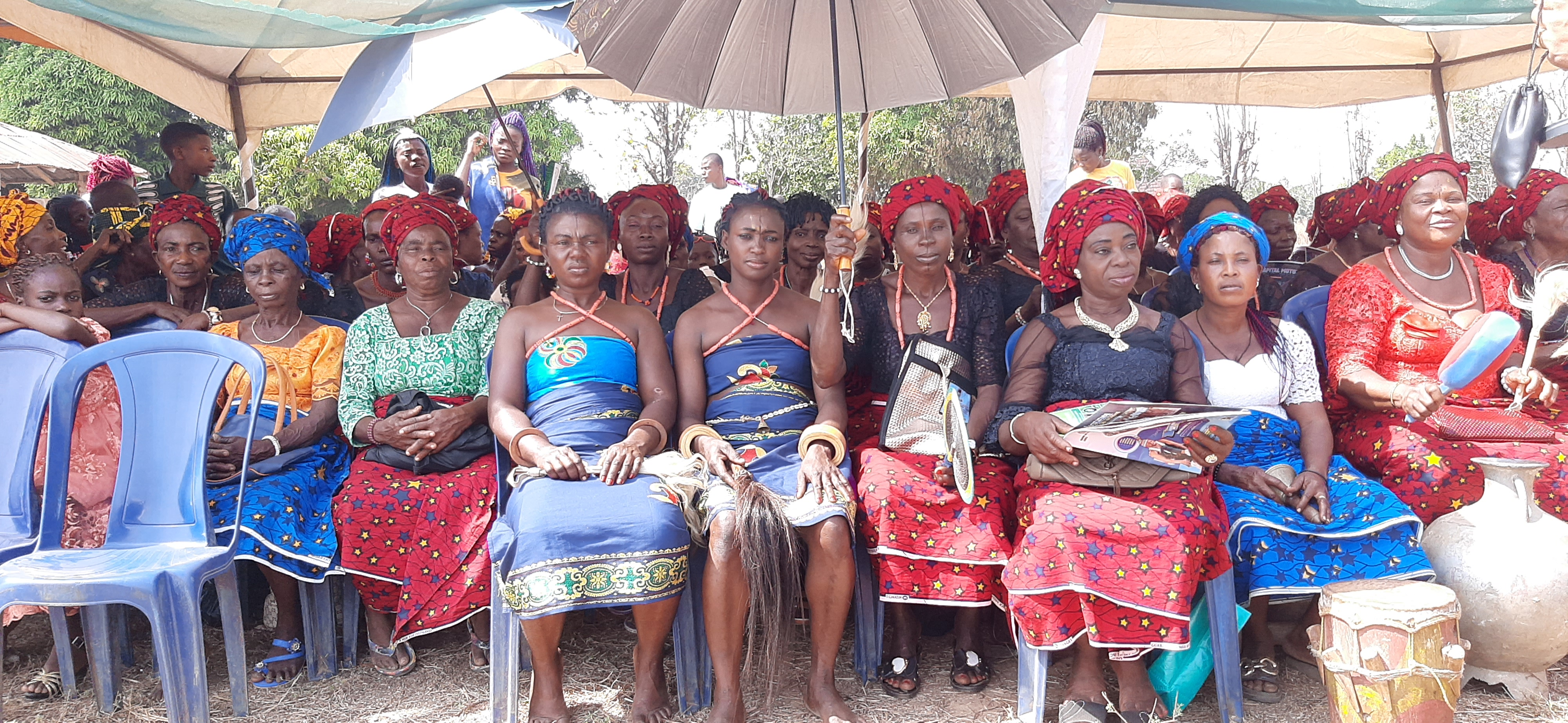
Amuda (Idzem) Cultural Group at the 2022 Orring Day Annual Festival

== Language ==
The Amuda people speak Korring.

== Distribution ==
The Amuda people are located predominantly in Ezza North Local Government Area. Some Amuda communities live in Effium (Amuda Effium) and Ntezi (Amuda Ntezi).

== History ==
The Amuda people like other Orring sub-ethnic groups in Ebonyi State, such as the Eteji, Lame, Okpolo and Uffiom), they are a sub Igbo group. They are the first settlers of Abakaliki prior to the coming of other igbiod sub ethnic groups, such as the Ezza, Izzi, Ikwo, Ngbo, and the others. Orring people are also found in Ukelle in Yala Local Government Area of Cross River state, and in Ufia of Ado LGA of Benue state, in which two of these K'orring speaking groups live in their common settlement prior to the present developments of history.

== Culture ==
Traditional ceremonies and festivals include Mukpushi (traditional marriage), Ugbuduogu, which marks the end of planting season, and Etukpa (new yam festival).

UNICEF, working with the Ebonyi State National Orientation Agency, helps raise awareness of safe practices for healthy living.
