= Ndasa language =

Bantu language spoken in Gabon and the Congo

Ndasa
- Native to: Gabon, Congo
- Native speakers: (5,500 cited 2000–2007)
- Language family: Niger–Congo?: Atlantic–Congo; Benue–Congo; Bantoid; Bantu (Zone B); Kele (b. 20); Ndasa

Language codes
- ISO 639-3: nda
- Glottolog: ndas1238
- Guthrie code: B.201

Ndasa is a Bantu language spoken in Gabon and the Congo.
