= KOZX =

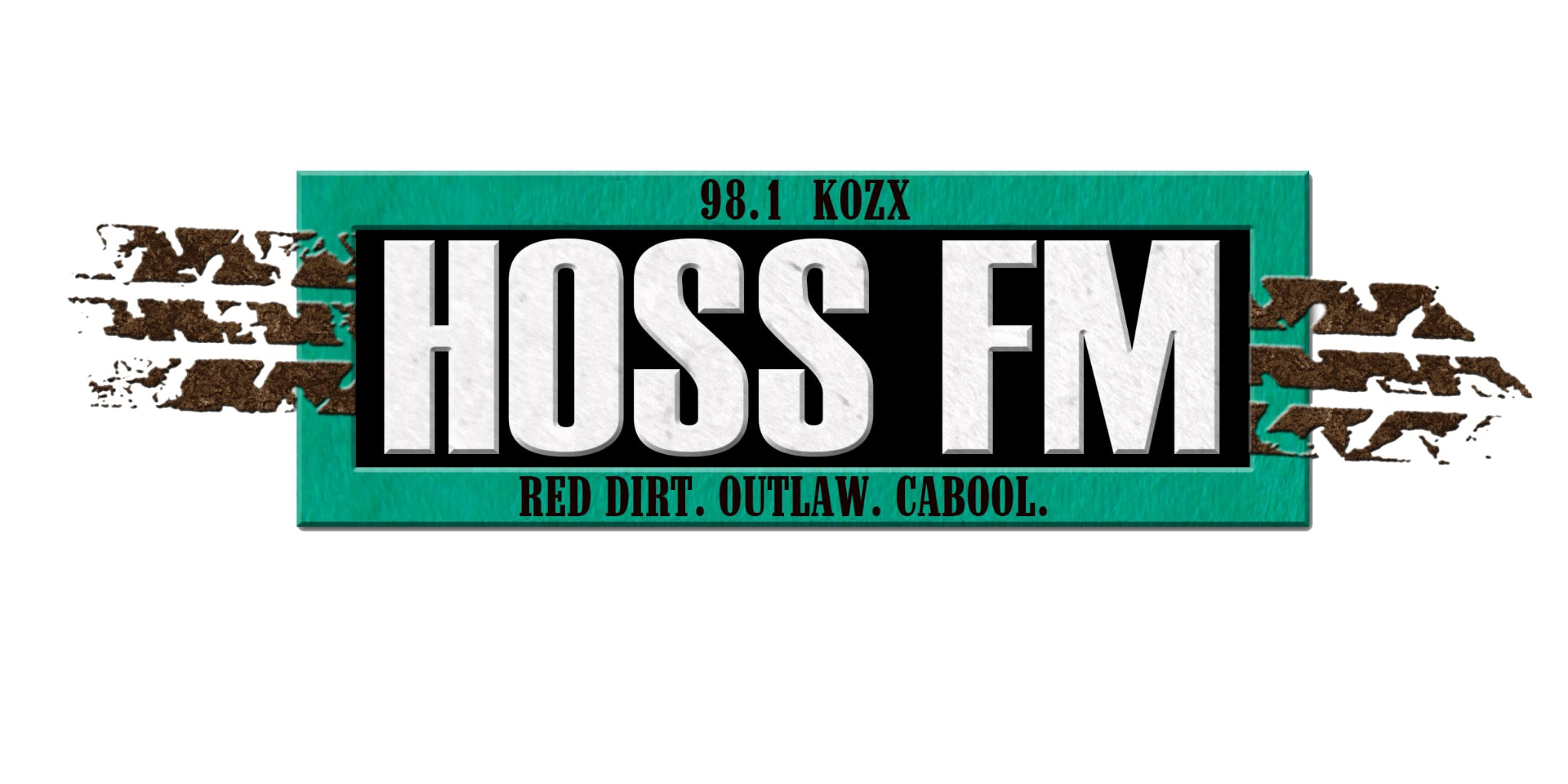
- Cabool, Missouri; United States
- Frequency: 98.1 MHz
- Branding: The Hoss FM

Programming
- Format: Red Dirt and Outlaw Country

Ownership
- Owner: Doug and Amy Driesel; (A and D Group, Inc.)
- Sister stations: KELE

History
- First air date: May 1978
- Former call signs: KVVC-FM (1978–1989)
- Former frequencies: MHz (1978–1989)

Technical information
- Licensing authority: FCC
- Facility ID: 68596
- Class: A
- ERP: 6,000 watts
- HAAT: 67 meters (220 ft)
- Transmitter coordinates: 37°07′58″N 92°08′03″W

Links
- Public license information: Public file; LMS
- Website: www.thehossfm.com

KOZX is a radio station airing a rock music format licensed to Cabool, Missouri, United States. It is known as The Hoss FM and owned by A and D Group, Inc.

This station began broadcasting as KVVC-FM 106.3 in 1978. It moved to 98.1 MHz in 1989, when it changed call signs to KOZX but retained its country music format.

In 2018, KOZX and its sister stations KELE AM and FM in Mountain Grove, then owned by Ozark Media, went silent. They resumed operation after nearly a year and were purchased by Joy Christian Communications, with KOZX running a Southern gospel format. The station was purchased by Dockins Communications in 2021. KFDS-FM (the former KELE FM) and KOZX were sold to Doug and Amy Driesel in 2025, with KOZX flipping from classic hits to a red dirt country format as "The Hoss".
