= Ishielu =

- LGA
- Interactive map of Ishielu
- Country: Nigeria
- State: Ebonyi State
- Capital: Ezillo

Government
  - Local Government Chairman: Agwu Peace Ifeoma

Area
  - Total: 872 km^{2} (337 sq mi)

Population (2006)
  - Total: 151,048
  - Density: 173/km^{2} (449/sq mi)
- Time zone: UTC+1 (WAT)
- Postal code: 481

Ishielu is a Local Government Area of Ebonyi State, Nigeria. Its headquarters are in the town of Ezillo. It has an area of 872 km^{2} and a population of 151,048 at the 2006 census. The postal code of the area is 481.

Ishielu LGA is made up of communities which can be categorized into two groups; The Orring-Agba group and the Igbo-Esa group. In no particular order, the communities are:

1. Nkalaha
2. Ntezi
3. Okpoto
4. Ohofia
5. Agba
6. Ezza-agu
7. Ezillo
8. Umuhali
9. Obeagu
10. Nkalagu
11. Amaezu
12. Iyonu
13. Azu inyaba

== Geography and climate ==
Ishielu LGA spans about 872 square kilometres or 337 square miles and maintains an average temperature of around 27 °C (81 °F). The area experiences two main seasons the dry and the rainy seasons and has an average humidity level of about 67 percent. The typical wind speed recorded in Ishielu LGA is approximately 10 km/h (9.1 ft/s; 6.2 mph). The area records generally high annual temperatures, usually falling between 21 and 31 °C (70 and 88 °F). On a typical day, temperatures often range from about 27 and 30 °C (81 and 86 °F).

== Economy ==
Agriculture is a key economic activity in Ishielu LGA, where crops like rice, yam, and cassava are widely cultivated. The area is also rich in mineral resources, including salt and limestone, and serves as an important centre for cement production. Trade thrives as well, supported by several markets such as the Ezillo and Nwafor Ehioji markets, where various goods are exchanged.
