= Sighu language =

Bantu language spoken in Gabon

Sigu
- Sighu
- Native to: Gabon
- Native speakers: (1,000 cited 1990)
- Language family: Niger–Congo?: Atlantic–Congo; Benue–Congo; Bantoid; Bantu (Zone B); Kele (b. 20); Sigu

Language codes
- ISO 639-3: sxe
- Glottolog: sigh1238
- Guthrie code: B.202
- ELP: Sighu

Sigu (Sighu) is an undocumented threatened Bantu language spoken in Gabon.
