= Samay language =

Bantu language spoken in Gabon

Samay
- Osamayi
- Native to: Gabon
- Native speakers: 1,000 (2007)
- Language family: Niger–Congo?: Atlantic–Congo; Benue–Congo; Bantoid; Bantu (Zone B); Kele (b. 20); Samay

Language codes
- ISO 639-3: syx
- Glottolog: osam1235
- Guthrie code: B.203

Samay (Osamayi, also Sama) is a minor Bantu language of Gabon.
