= Seki language =

Language indigenous to Equatorial Guinea and Gabon

Seki
- Sekiyani
- Native to: Equatorial Guinea, Gabon
- Native speakers: (12,000 cited 2001-2007)
- Language family: Niger–Congo?: Atlantic–Congo; Benue–Congo; Bantoid; Bantu (Zone B); Kele (B.20) ?; Seki

Language codes
- ISO 639-3: syi
- Glottolog: seki1238
- Guthrie code: B.21
- ELP: Seki
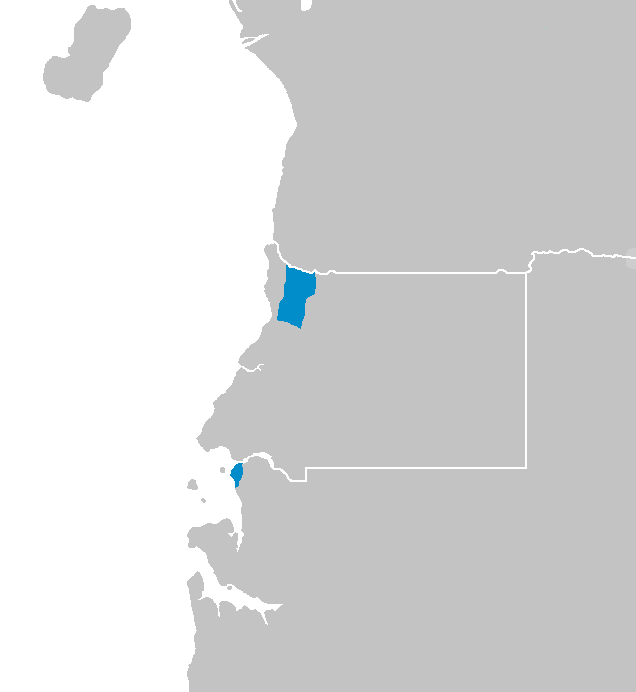

Seki, also Baseke, Sheke or Sekiana, is a language indigenous to Equatorial Guinea and Gabon. It had been spoken in villages of Rio Campo and Northern Bata, along the coast, but its native speakers have begun abandoning the language for Spanish, Fang, and Kombe. Can be related to Kako spoken in the East region of Cameroon and some parts of the west of Central African Republic.

== Phonology ==
=== Consonants ===
		Labial	Alveolar	Post-alv./ Palatal	Velar	Labio- velar
Nasal		m	n	ɲ	(ŋ)	
Plosive/ Affricate	voiceless	p	t	t͡ʃ	k	
Plosive/ Affricate	voiced	b	d	(d͡ʒ)	ɡ	
Plosive/ Affricate	prenasal vl.	ᵐp	ⁿt	ⁿt͡ʃ	ᵑk	
Plosive/ Affricate	prenasal vd.	ᵐb	ⁿd	ⁿd͡ʒ	ᵑɡ	ᵑɡ͡b
Fricative	voiceless		s			
Fricative	voiced	β	(z)			
Rhotic			r			
Approximant			l	j		w

- /z, d͡ʒ/ only rarely occur phonemically.
- /ɡ/ may be lenited as [ɣ] in intervocalic positions.
- /ᵑɡ/ can be heard as a nasal [ŋ] when in word-final position, or when followed by /l/.

=== Vowels ===
	Front	Central	Back
Close	i		u
Close-mid	e		o
Open-mid	ɛ		ɔ
Open		a	
