= Metombola language =

Bantu language of Gabon

Metombola
- Native to: Gabon
- Language family: Niger–Congo?: Atlantic–Congo; Benue–Congo; Bantoid; Bantu (Zone B); Kele (b. 20); Metombola

Language codes
- ISO 639-3: None (mis)
- Glottolog: None
- Guthrie code: B.205

Metombola is a minor Bantu language of Gabon.
