= Sake language =

Bantu language spoken in Gabon

Shake
- Sake
- Native to: Gabon
- Native speakers: 8,000 (2007)
- Language family: Niger–Congo?: Atlantic–Congo; Benue–Congo; Bantoid; Bantu (Zone B); Kele (b. 20); Shake

Language codes
- ISO 639-3: sak
- Glottolog: sake1247
- Guthrie code: B.251
- ELP: Sake

Sake (Shake) is an undocumented and threatened Bantu language spoken in Gabon.
