= Mahongwe language =

Bantu language spoken in Gabon

Mahongwe
- Native to: Gabon
- Native speakers: 8,000 (2007)
- Language family: Niger–Congo?: Atlantic–Congo; Benue–Congo; Bantoid; Bantu (Zone B); Kele (b. 20); Mahongwe

Language codes
- ISO 639-3: mhb
- Glottolog: maho1248
- Guthrie code: B.252
- ELP: Mahongwe

Mahongwe is an undocumented and threatened Bantu language spoken in Gabon. The Mahongwe language is a language spoken by the Mahongwe people, belonging to the Bantu ethnic group, who mainly reside in the central Gabon region. It is one of several Bantoid languages spoken in the Central African region.

The Mahongwe language is part of the Bantuid branch of the Niger-Congo language family. Under the broad umbrella of Bantu languages, Mahongwe is classified within the subgroup of Northern Bantu languages, which includes languages spoken in Cameroon, Gabon, Congo, and the Central African Republic.

Mahongwe is spoken by around 20,000 people, mainly in Gabon, but there are also some communities of Mahongwe speakers in other parts of Central Africa. The language has no official status and is not widely taught in schools, so it is considered an endangered language.

From a linguistic point of view, Mahongwe presents a number of interesting characteristics. It is a tonal language, meaning that variation in tone can distinguish words with different meanings. It also has a complex grammatical structure, with a focus on the noun system. For example, nouns in Mahongwe can have noun classes and agreement agreements based on gender, number, and other grammatical categories.

Regarding vocabulary, Mahongwe inherited a basic set of words from Proto-Bantu, but also absorbed influences from other languages in the region, such as French and surrounding local languages.

Due to social change and the influence of dominant languages, such as French, Mahongwe is under threat and facing rapid erosion. Many young Mahongwe speak predominantly French, and only a few maintain proficiency in their ancestral language.

However, efforts have been made by some members of the Mahongwe community to preserve and promote their language. Language revitalization programs have been organised, including documentation projects and teaching Mahongwe in local schools. These efforts are critical to conserving the linguistic and cultural heritage of the Mahongwe people.
