= Wumbvu language =

Bantu language spoken in Gabon and the Congo

Wumbvu
- Native to: Gabon, Congo
- Native speakers: (18,000 in Gabon cited 2000)
- Language family: Niger–Congo?: Atlantic–Congo; Benue–Congo; Bantoid; Bantu (Zone B); Kele (b. 20); Wumbvu

Language codes
- ISO 639-3: wum
- Glottolog: wumb1242
- Guthrie code: B.24

Wumbvu (Wumvu) is a Bantu language spoken in Gabon and the Congo.
