= Kele languages =

Bantu language family

Kele
- Sheke
- Linguistic classification: Niger–Congo?: Atlantic–Congo; Benue–Congo; Southern Bantoid; Bantu (Zone B.20); Kele–Tsogo?; Kele

Language codes
- ISO 639-3: –
- Glottolog: None grea1288 (Ndasaic) kele1262 (Ngomic)

The Kele or Sheke languages are a clade of Bantu languages coded Zone B.20 in Guthrie's classification. According to Nurse & Philippson (2003), apart possibly from Seki (Sheke) (B.21) itself, the languages form a valid node. They are:

Lengue, Ndasa, Sigu (Sighu), Kele (Dikele), Ngom, Mbangwe, Wumbvu, Kota, Shake (Sake), Mahongwe, ?Seki (Sheke)

Maho (2009) adds B203 Sama, B204 Ndambomo, B205 Metombola.
