= Ndambomo language =

Bantu language spoken in Gabon

Ndambomo
- Native to: Gabon
- Native speakers: 2,000 (2007)
- Language family: Niger–Congo?: Atlantic–Congo; Benue–Congo; Bantoid; Bantu (Zone B); Kele (b. 20); Ndambomo

Language codes
- ISO 639-3: nxo
- Glottolog: ndam1254
- Guthrie code: B.204

Ndambomo is a minor Bantu language of Gabon.
