= KELE (FM) =

- Mountain Grove, Missouri; United States
- Frequency: 92.5 MHz
- Branding: Ozark Mountain Groove (OMG)

Programming
- Format: Variety hits

Ownership
- Owner: A & D Group, Inc.
- Sister stations: KOZX

History
- First air date: 1977
- Former call signs: KLRS-FM (1976–1987); KRFI-FM (1987–1989); KCMG-FM (1989–1997); KELE-FM (1997–2024); KFDS-FM (2024–2026)

Technical information
- Licensing authority: FCC
- Facility ID: 12714
- Class: A
- ERP: 6,000 watts
- HAAT: 91.4 meters (300 ft)
- Transmitter coordinates: 37°8′7.2″N 92°14′59.6″W

Links
- Public license information: Public file; LMS

KELE (92.5 FM) is a radio station licensed to Mountain Grove, Missouri, United States. The station is currently owned by A & D Group, Inc. and broadcasts a variety hits format known as Ozark Mountain Groove.

== History ==
The station was first licensed in 1977 as KLRS-FM. It became KRFI-FM in 1987, KCMG-FM in 1989, KELE-FM in 1997, KFDS-FM in 2024, and KELE in 2026.

== See also ==
- KELE (AM), the former AM station at Mountain Grove
