= KELE (AM) =

- Mountain Grove, Missouri; United States
- Frequency: 1360 kHz
- Branding: AM 1360 The Patriot

Programming
- Format: News/talk
- Affiliations: CBS News Radio; NBC News Radio; Genesis Communications Network; Radio America; Westwood One

Ownership
- Owner: Fred Dockins; (Dockins Communications, Inc)
- Sister stations: KFDS-FM; KOZX; KFLW

History
- First air date: 1954
- Last air date: February 2024
- Former call signs: KLRS (1954–1987); KRFI (1987–1989); KCMG (1989–1996)

Technical information
- Licensing authority: FCC
- Facility ID: 12699
- Class: D
- Power: 1,000 watts day; 60 watts night
- Transmitter coordinates: 37.135278°N 92.249722°W

Links
- Public license information: Public file; LMS
- Website: 925thegrove.wordpress.com/about/am-1360-the-patriot/

KELE (1360 kHz) was an AM radio station airing a news/talk format licensed to Mountain Grove, Missouri. The station was owned by Fred Dockins, through licensee Dockins Communications, Inc. KELE was branded as "The Patriot".

KELE was an affiliate of Westwood One and CBS News Radio along with Radio America. The weekday program lineup included America in The Morning, First Light, Doug Stephan’s Good Day, The Jonathon Brandmeier Show, The Dana Show, The Ramsey Show, The Chad Benson Show and The Jim Bohannon Show.

KELE also carried local news at the bottom of the hour 24 hours a day along with local weather and feature programming.

KELE left the air in February 2024 due to transmitter failure. The Federal Communications Commission cancelled the station’s license on December 12, 2024.
