= Kele language (Gabon) =

Bantu language spoken in Gabon

Kélé
- Dikele
- Native to: Gabon, a few in Congo
- Ethnicity: Kele people
- Native speakers: (14,000 cited 2000–2007)
- Language family: Niger–Congo?: Atlantic–Congo; Benue–Congo; Bantoid; Bantu (Zone B); Kele languages (b. 20); Kélé

Language codes
- ISO 639-3: Either: keb – West Kele, Bubi nra – Ngom
- Guthrie code: B.22

Kele is a Bantu language of Gabon. Dialects of the Kele language are scattered throughout Gabon.

- West Kele (Kili) is spoken by the Kele people, scattered in Middle Ogooué Province, Mimongo area.
- Ngom (Angom, Ungomo) is used with only minor differences by the Kola/Koya Pygmies. It is spoken on both sides of the border with the Republic of the Congo.
- Bubi (not the same as the Bubi language)
- Tombidi
- Mwesa

== Phonology ==
Consonants
	Labial	Alveolar	Dorsal
Plosive	p b	t d	k g
Fricative	f v	s z	
Nasal	m	n	ŋ
Approximant	w	l	j

Vowels
	Front	Central	Back
High	i iː		u uː
Mid-high	e eː		o oː
Mid-low	ɛ ɛː		ɔ ɔː
Low		a aː	

Kele also has two tones; high and low.
