= Lengue language =

Bantu language spoken in Equatorial Guinea

Lengue
- Molengue
- Native to: Equatorial Guinea
- Ethnicity: Balengue
- Native speakers: 1,000 (2011)
- Language family: Niger–Congo?: Atlantic–Congo; Benue–Congo; Bantoid; Bantu (Zone B); Kélé (b. 20); Lengue

Language codes
- ISO 639-3: bxc
- Glottolog: mole1238
- Guthrie code: B.221

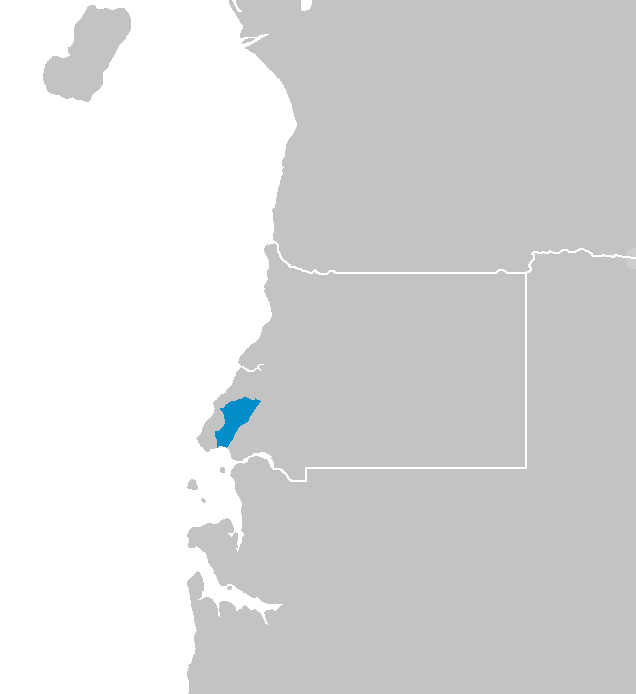
The Lengue language is spoken here; Idioma balengue

The Lengue language, also called Molengue, Balengue, Molendji, is a Bantu language of southern Equatorial Guinea, spoken by the Lengue people between Bata and the Gabon border near the coast. The speakers have come under increasing Fang influence. The Ethnologue describes it as a member of the B subgroup of Northwest Bantu, while Echegaray is more specific, saying that it is linguistically a member of the Sheke group (B21 of Guthrie's Bantu subclassification):

"The Balengues – linguistically at least – are related to the Sheke group in general, and especially to Itemus and Nvikos." (p. 51)

Echegaray lists their main settlements as being located south of Bata between Punta Nguba and the Benito River, as well as three before the Ndote River, and a few further south or inland.
