= Kele people (Gabon) =

Kele
Total population
- 10,774

Regions with significant populations

Languages
- Kele language, French language

Religion
- Catholicism

The Kele people (or Akele, Bakele, Dikele, Western Kele) are an ethnic group in Gabon with an estimated population of 10,774.

They live in groups around Mimongo in or near Middle Ogooue Province. Their Kele language is part of the Northwest Bantu cluster. They were known in the past as skilled hunters, and were also one of the main groups participating in the slave trade. American missionaries from the American Board of Commissioners for Foreign Missions started working with the Kele as early as 1849, but due to insecurity later withdrew to Nengenenge island.
