= Lengue people =

Ethnic group of people indigenous to Equatorial Guinea

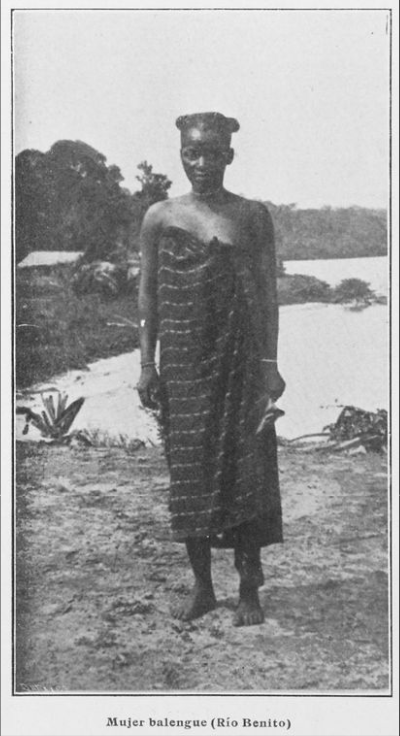
Lengue woman

Lengue people, or Balengue, are an African ethnic group, members of the Bantu group. Their indigenous language is Lengue. Lengue people currently inhabit the coastal region of the mainland of Equatorial Guinea, south of Bata.

This ethnic group has become increasingly influence by Fang culture during the past couple of decades; but have maintained their linguistic identity. They are referred to as Ndowe or "Playeros" (Beach People in Spanish), one of several peoples on the Rio Muni coast.
