= Korring =

Cross River language spoken in Nigeria

Orring
- Native to: Nigeria
- Native speakers: 700,000 (2019)
- Language family: Niger–Congo?: Atlantic–Congo; Benue–Congo; Cross River; Upper Cross; Central; North–South; Korring–Kukele; Orring

Language codes
- ISO 639-3: org
- Glottolog: orin1239

Orring (Korring) is an Upper Cross River language spoken by the Orring people of Nigeria. Korring language is spoken by the Orring people who are found in Benue, Cross River and Ebonyi states of Nigeria.

== Related dialects ==
Dialects are classified under a particular community. In places like where the Niger-Congo languages are spoken, languages and particularly dialects are named by prefixing the community name with its progenitor, this is also the case with Korring dialects and many other bantiod language of the upper Cross River groups. In Korring therefore, the letter K is emminiently in usage; take for instance as in Eteji (Ntezi), the dialect is K'eteji, while Lame (Okpoto) speak Ki'lame, Idzem (Amuda) speak K'idzem, Okpolo (Opkomoro) speak K'okpolo, Uffium( Effium) speak K'uffium in Ebonyi State, Nigeria. Ufia (Utonkon) in Benue State speak K'ufia. Ukelle, in Cross River State, speak K'ukelle, as the case may be. In some cases, also, the term 'K''' has been used interchangeably as an article that modifies Korring terms, however it is better used as a prefix than it is used as an article.

== Abakaliki territory ==
Owing to their heritage in Ebonyi State, Abakaliki scholars such as C.C Ugoh in his book Gods of Abakaliki stated that the Orring people settled in Abakaliki territory prior to the coming of the four major Igbo groups of Ezza, Izzi, Ikwo and Ngbo. Other writers mentioned the Orring as the aboriginals of Abakaliki region prior to the coming of the Igbo groups.

Orring intermarried with Igbo and created a hybrid culture. The Orring settled in Ntezi-Aba in Abakaliki before spreading to other settlements within Ebonyi State. Abakaliki is a Mbembe term the emerged before the coming of the later Abakaliki People.
