= Ntezi =

Ntezi Eteji-Ogba
- Town
- Ntezi
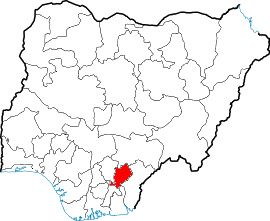
- Ntezi
- Country: Nigeria
- State: Ebonyi State
- LGA: Ishielu
- Postal code: 480002
- Area code: 480012

Ntezi a is town located in the eastern outskirts of Ishielu, Nigeria and is populated by an Orring sub-ethnic group.

== Villages ==
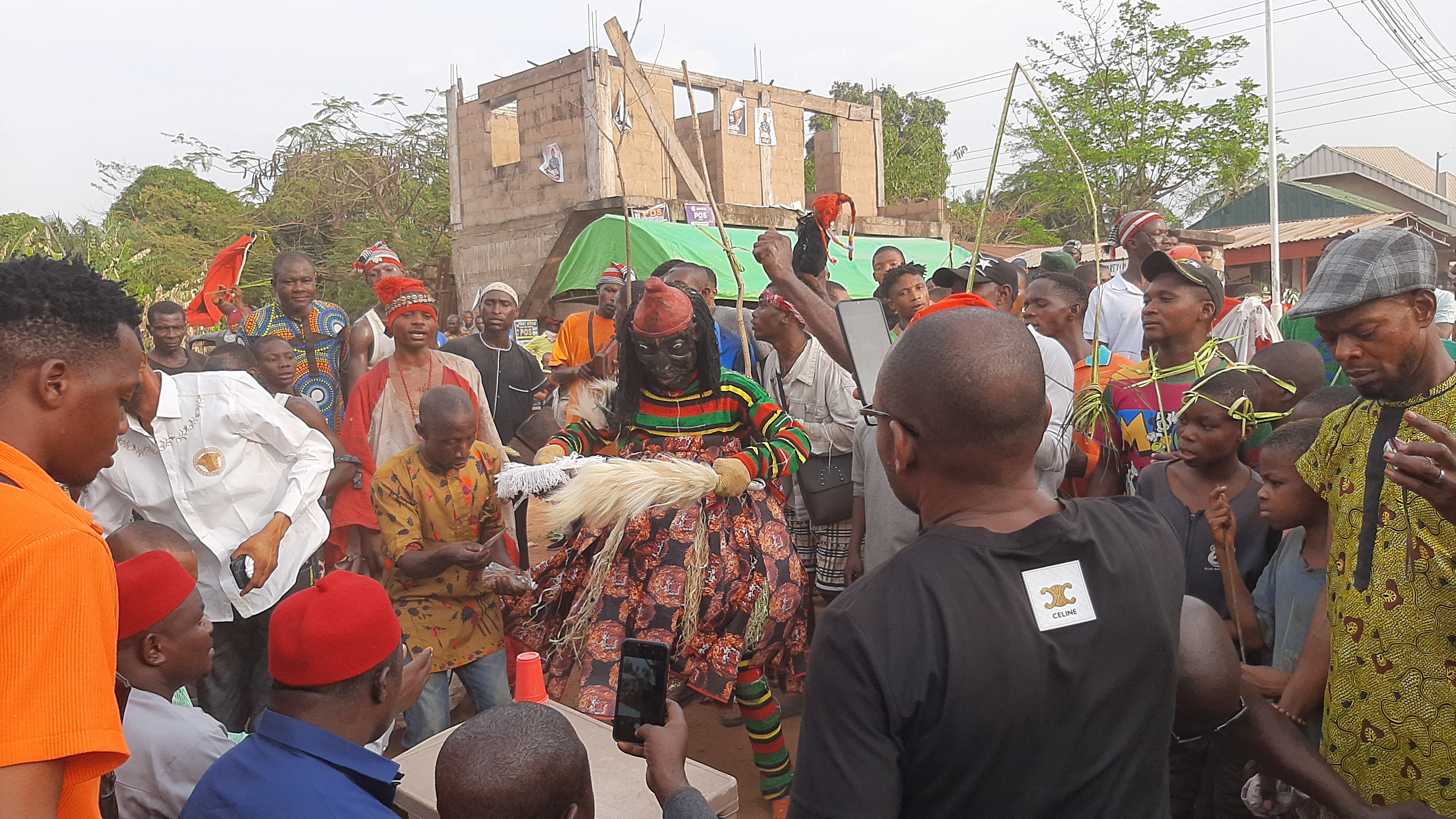
Oviode Festival in Ntezi

Ntezi is a homogeneous community comprising five Korring-speaking clans, whose ancestors are recognized as the sole founders of Nteziland. According to oral traditions, notably narrated by Papa Okpurakpu (2005) of the Bilode kindred in Ulepa clan, the Orring patriarchs of Ntezi extraction trace their ancestry to Ugboloke, the progenitor of Eteji. Ugboloke's descendants subsequently established the principal clans of Agaga, Amata, Biledeba, Iyokpa, and Ulepa (arranged alphabetically) which together constitute the Ntezi town. These clans are further organized into homogenous villages, subdivided into various hamlets and farm settlements that reflect a deeply rooted socio-cultural unity among the people.

== Colonial record ==
A significant episode in Ntezi’s history occurred around 1928, during a period of heightened tension between the Ntezi community and Ezza settlers. At the time, a prominent Ntezi statesman, Agivoh Igiri-Nya, alongside other community representatives, embarked on a historic journey on foot to the Ogoja Administrative Court. Their mission was to formally lodge a complaint regarding what they perceived as the unlawful incursion of Ezza settlers into Nteziland. The Ntezi community had previously permitted the Ezza temporary settlement rights for agricultural purposes under a tenancy arrangement, which required the payment of annual tribute as part of the agreement. However, these terms were reportedly violated, with the Ezza neither fulfilling the agreed payments nor respecting the territorial limits established under colonial jurisdiction.

The intervention of the colonial administration marked a decisive moment in the dispute. The Ogoja Administrative Court adjudicated in favor of Ntezi, reaffirming their territorial rights while formally granting the Ezza a documented tenancy status. This arrangement mandated annual payments in recognition of the tenancy agreement, a development that temporarily stabilized relations between the two groups. Nevertheless, tensions resurfaced in subsequent decades. Archival records from the 1940s reveal that the colonial authorities remained dissatisfied with continued Ezza encroachments. An official statement by Cook, documented in page five of an archival source on Ntezi in the Ogoja Province, explicitly noted that “the Ezza, however, have overstepped the boundaries,” underscoring the persistent challenges in managing inter-community boundaries during the colonial era.

Ntezi is one of the Koring speaking communities in Ebonyi state, Nigeria. The people are called Oring, and the language is Koring.

== Language ==
Korring is the indigenous most common language spoken among Ntezi people. The people also speak central Igbo fluently, and equally bear Igbo names, but as surnames and first names. The Korring dialects spoken in Ntezi is “Keteji,” Korring is grouped into different languages similar to Kukele, and Kufia of Cross River and Benue states respectively. The Korring dialect spoken in Ebonyi has exchanged number of linguistic borrowings with Igbo language spoken in the state.
