= Effium =

- Town
- Location in Nigeria
- Coordinates: 6°38′N 8°04′E
- Country: Nigeria
- State: Ebonyi State
- Time zone: UTC+1 (WAT)

Effium is the largest of the autonomous Orring communities in Ebonyi State of southeast region, Nigeria. Effium is located in the Ohaukwu local government area of Ebonyi State. The indigenous people are the Effium, a subgroup of the Orring people found in Ebonyi, Benue and Cross River states.

== Economy ==
The major occupation in Effium is agriculture. The major agricultural products include: yam, cassava, rice, groundnut, palm oil and timbers.

== Demographics ==
Effium community has other minor communities known as Okporo, Okpodum, Okpere, Ivweda, Ebia, Watuma, Ogbagere, Ikachi, Ohage, Enweminyi, Ubegu, Okpudu, Uffiacha, Ibilifu, Ikachi, and Lebadọgọm communities.

== History ==
The first tribe that settled in Effium were the Effium people then they accommodated the Ezza followed by Arochukwu, Amuda and others.

== Culture ==
Effium as a community has common cultures that has been passed down by the ancestors of Effium which includes: New yam festival Jioha, and Kija S'etuo. Other cultural ceremonies include Vwujojo, and Vwugba.

Effium shares common boundaries with Benue State, Izzi, Ngbo, Uli and Igumale.

It has a very large market popularly known as Effium main market among many others where agricultural commodities are purchased in large quantities and transported to other parts of the country and for export. It is one of the largest markets in Ebonyi State, Nigeria. Other markets in Effium include Inikiri Udeno market and Inikiri ichari market.

== See also ==
- Lists of villages in Nigeria
