= Izzi people =

Izhi
Total population
- 865,000

Regions with significant populations
- Nigeria 865,000

Languages
- Igboid languages

Izhi// is a North Eastern Igbo sub-group, in South Eastern, Nigeria. It is also the name of the territory in which they live - Izzi Local Government Area. They speak the Izhi dialect. Izhi is spoken majorly in Ebonyi State and some parts of Benue State. Some notable persons from Izzi include the current Governor, Rt. Hon. Francis Ogbonna Nwifuru, and Elias Mbam, the former Revenue Mobilisation Allocation and Fiscal Commission chairman.
