= Sunday Elom =

Nigerian academics

3rd Vice-Chancellor of Alex Ekwueme Federal University Ndufu Alike Ikwo
- Incumbent
- Assumed office 11 February 2021
- Preceded by: Chinedum Nwajiuba

Personal details
- Born: Sunday Oge Elom; 5 November 1961 (age 64) Ekwashi, Ngbo, Ohaukwu LGA, Ebonyi State
- Education: University of Nigeria, Nsukka
- Profession: Academic; Educator; Administrator

Sunday Oge Elom (born 5 November 1961) is a Nigerian professor of Medical Biochemistry who became the first indigenous, and third substantive Vice Chancellor of Alex Ekwueme Federal University Ndufu-Alike, (AE-FUNAI) Ebonyi State, Nigeria since January 2021. He was the immediate Deputy Vice-Chancellor (Academics) before his appointment as the Vice-Chancellor of the institution.

== Educational background ==
Elom attended the University of Nigeria, Nsukka, where he obtained his first degree in Biochemistry, graduating with First Class Honours. He then proceeded to Vrue University, Brussels, Belgium, where he obtained a Master of Science (M.Sc.) degree in Molecular Biology, in 1992. In furtherance of his academic pursuit, he attended Ebonyi State University, Abakaliki, where he bagged a Doctor of Philosophy (Ph.D.) in Medical Biochemistry, in 2006.

== Career ==
Elom's prospects in academia first came to light in 1987 when he held a Research Assistant position in the Department of Applied Biology, Anambra State University of Science and Technology (ASUTECH). His career as an academic scholar spans over thirty years, with many published academic papers and other scholarly work to his name. In 2006, he attained the position of a professor of Medical Biochemistry, and has since acted in various administrative capacity in the Nigerian university system.
