= South East (Nigeria) =

- Geopolitical Zone
- Interactive map of South East
- Country: Nigeria
- States: Abia State; Anambra State; Ebonyi State; Enugu State; Imo State
- Largest city: Onitsha
- Major cities: Aba; Enugu; Owerri; Nnewi; Umuahia; Awka; Abakaliki; Nsukka

Area
  - Total: 29,388 km^{2} (11,347 sq mi)

Population (2022)
  - Total: 24,488,500
- Time zone: UTC+1 (WAT)
- Languages: English; Ezaa; Idoma; Igala; Igbo; Ikwo; Izi; Mgbo; Nigerian Sign Language; Ngwa

The six geopolitical zones of Nigeria.

The South East (often written as South-East) is one of the six geopolitical zones of Nigeria representing both a geographic and a political region of the country's inland southeast. It comprises five states – Abia, Anambra, Ebonyi, Enugu, and Imo.

The zone is bounded by the River Niger on the west, the riverine Niger Delta on the south, the flat North Central to the north, and the Cross River on the east. It is divided between the Cross–Niger transition forests ecoregions in the south and the Guinean forest–savanna mosaic in the drier north. Culturally, the vast majority of the zone falls within Igboland – the indigenous cultural homeland of the Igbo people, a group which makes up the largest ethnic percentage of the southeastern population.

Although the South East is the smallest geopolitical zone, it contributes greatly to the Nigerian economy due to oil and natural gas reserves along with a growing industrialized economy. The region has a population of about 36 million people, around 18% of the total population of the country. Onitsha and Aba are the two most populous cities in the South East. Other large southeastern cities include Umuahia, Enugu, Owerri, Nnewi, Awka, and Abakaliki.

The South East is predominantly Igbo ethnically and linguistically. Various Igbo subgroups and their dialects in the South East are the Owerri people, Mbaise people, Nkanu people, Ngwa people, Omambala people, Nsukka people, Enuani people, Ezza people, Afikpo people, Aro people, Igala(Yoruboid) people, Aguata/Orumba, Okigwe people, Egbema people, Izzi people, Effium people, Idemili people, Agbaja people, Ikwo people, Ndoki people, Nkporo people, Abiriba people, Ohafia people Orlu people, Ohaji people, Ohaozara people, Anaedo people and many others.

== Economy ==
The zone has 95 local government areas with a total population of over twenty million people. The zone has about ten large commercial cities. Apart from agriculture which is the major economic activity, the zone is also known as for commercial and trading activities with small and medium indigenous industries that are manufacturing goods and services. The main agricultural products in the zone are yam, cassava, rice, and cocoyam. The zone has solid minerals and nature resources such as crude oil, natural gas, bauxite, iron ore, sandstone, lignite, clay, coal, tin and columbite.

It is estimated that the sit-at-home order in South East cost the geopolitical zone more than 7.6 trillion naira within two years. On July 21, 2023, Nnamdi Kalu through his lawyer and IPOB's spokesperson, Emma Powerful, cancelled the Monday IPOB sit-at-home order imposed on South East States.

== Origin and people ==
The South East came about with Alex Ekwueme's recommendations, although is formerly known as Eastern Nigeria, or simply East, following the division of the country into three parts in 1950s. In 1967, it was later split into three under the Gowon Administration (1967–1975). It was in 1976 that more states, including Imo and Anambra began to emerge.

South East is occupied by Igbos.

== See also ==
- Eastern Nigeria
- Igboland
- Alex Ekwueme
- Owo
