= List of people from Afikpo =

Afikpo is the second most urbanized area in Ebonyi, Nigeria, after the state capital Abakaliki. It is also known as Afikpo North LGA. Formerly, Afikpo used to consist of Afikpo North and Afikpo South, but Afikpo South was administratively renamed to its historical nomenclature, Edda.

The current member of the House of Representatives (9th assembly) representing Afikpo North / Afikpo South federal constituency is Iduma Igariwey Enwo.

Below is a list of people from Afikpo:

- Akanu Ibiam
- Uche Azikiwe
- Iduma Igariwey Enwo
- Priscilla Ekwere Eleje
- Chris Abani
- Michael Nnachi Okoro
- Francis Otunta
- Nnenna Oti
