= List of federal polytechnics in South East Nigeria =

This article is a list of federal polytechnics in South East Nigeria. It does not include state owned polytechnics, private polytechnics and other technical institutions.

The South East region of Nigeria, comprising the states of Abia, Anambra, Ebonyi, Enugu, and Imo, is home to several federal polytechnics. These institutions provide technical and vocational education and contribute to the region's economic and industrial development.The polytechnics and colleges are regulated by the Nigerian Federal Ministry of Education, through the National Board for Technical Education (NBTE).The official medium of instruction in these institutions is English language.

== Institutions ==
S/N	State	Name	Location	Website
1.	Abia State	Federal Polytechnic Ngodo-Isuochi	Isuochi, Abia State	https://www.fpi.edu.ng/
2.	Anambra State	Federal Polytechnic, Oko	Oko, Anambra State	https://federalpolyoko.edu.ng/
3.	Ebonyi State	Akanu Ibiam Federal Polytechnic, Unwana	Unwana, Afikpo North LGA, Ebonyi State	https://www.polyunwana.net/
4.	Enugu State	Federal Polytechnic Ohodo	Ohodo, Enugu State	https://fedpod.edu.ng/
5.	Imo State	Federal Polytechnic Nekede, Owerri	Owerri, Imo State	https://fpno.edu.ng/

== Academic programs and specializations ==
The federal polytechnics in the South East region offer a diverse range of programs designed to equip students with practical skills and knowledge Common fields of study include but are not limited to the following:

- Civil Engineering
- Electrical/Electronic Engineering
- Mechanical Engineering
- Computer Science
- Computer Engineering
- Accountancy
- Business Administration
- Mass Communication
- Environmental Studies
- Food Science Technology
- Science Laboratory Technology
- Hospitality Management and Tourism

== See also ==
- List of Polytechnics in Nigeria
