= Ogiji Imo Chike =

Nigerian politician

State Representative
- In office 2007–2019
- Constituency: Ikwo South

Personal details
- Occupation: Politician

Ogiji Imo Chike is a Nigerian politician who served three consecutive terms in the Ebonyi State House of Assembly, representing the Ikwo South State Constituency.

== Controversies ==
In 2018, Ogiji was arraigned before an Abakaliki Magistrate Court by the Nigeria Police on charges of allegedly forging his First School Leaving Certificate and primary school testimonial.
