= Ehugbo =

Afikpo Ali Ehugbo Omaka-ejali Ehugbo
- City
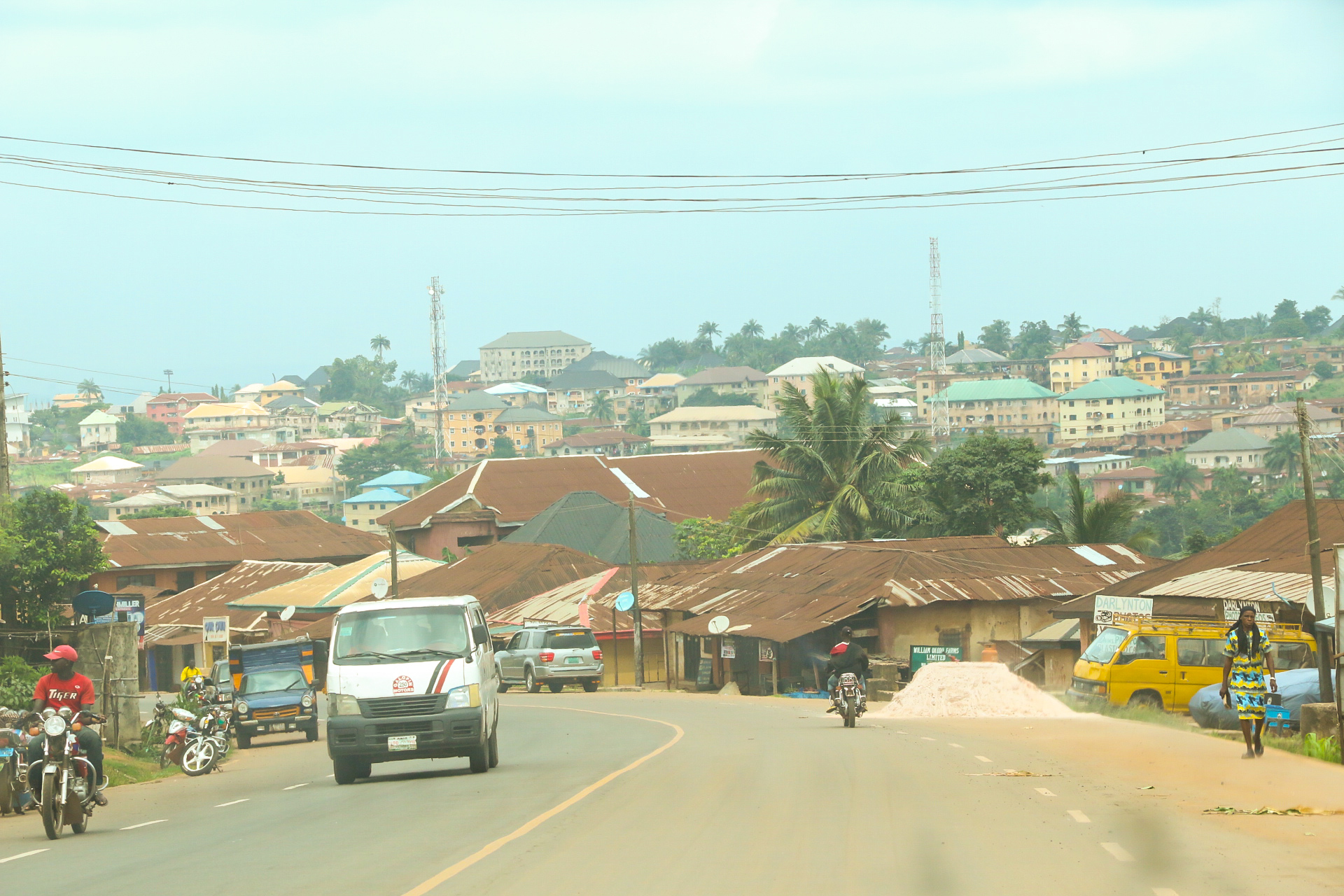
- Ehugbo street

- Location in Nigeria
- Coordinates: 5°53′N 7°56′E
- Country: Nigeria
- State: Ebonyi State
- LGA: Afikpo North

Area
  - Total: 164 km^{2} (63 sq mi)
- Elevation: 62 m (203 ft)

Population (2006)
  - Total: 156,611
  - Density: 955/km^{2} (2,470/sq mi)

Languages
  - National language: Igbo
- Time zone: UTC+1 (WAT)

Ehugbo often referred to as Afikpo, is the second largest urban area in Ebonyi State, Nigeria. It is the headquarters of the Afikpo North Local Government Area.

It is situated in the southern part of Ebonyi State and is bordered to the north by the town of Akpoha, to the south by Unwana, to the south west by Edda LGA, to the east by the Cross River State and to the west by Amasiri town. Afikpo spans an area approximately 164 km^{2} (63 sq mi). It is located on 6 degrees north latitude and 8 degrees east longitude. Afikpo is a hilly area despite occupying a region low in altitude, which rises 110 metres (350 feet) above sea level. It is a transitional area between open grassland and tropical forest and has an average annual rainfall of 2,000 millimetres (79 inches).

The population of Afikpo is estimated at 156,611, according to the Nigerian 2006 Census.

== Climate ==
Köppen-Geiger climate classification system classifies its climate as tropical wet and dry (Aw).

Climate data for Afikpo
Month	Jan	Feb	Mar	Apr	May	Jun	Jul	Aug	Sep	Oct	Nov	Dec	Year
Mean daily maximum °C (°F)	32.6 (90.7)	33.8 (92.8)	33.8 (92.8)	33.4 (92.1)	32 (90)	30.8 (87.4)	29.3 (84.7)	28.6 (83.5)	29.9 (85.8)	30.8 (87.4)	32.1 (89.8)	32.6 (90.7)	31.6 (89.0)
Daily mean °C (°F)	27.5 (81.5)	28.5 (83.3)	29 (84)	28.7 (83.7)	27.6 (81.7)	26.7 (80.1)	25.4 (77.7)	25.6 (78.1)	26 (79)	26.6 (79.9)	27.4 (81.3)	27.4 (81.3)	27.2 (81.0)
Mean daily minimum °C (°F)	22.5 (72.5)	23.2 (73.8)	24.2 (75.6)	24 (75)	23.3 (73.9)	22.6 (72.7)	22.2 (72.0)	22.7 (72.9)	22.2 (72.0)	22.4 (72.3)	22.8 (73.0)	22.3 (72.1)	22.9 (73.1)
Average precipitation mm (inches)	19 (0.7)	34 (1.3)	84 (3.3)	159 (6.3)	247 (9.7)	261 (10.3)	303 (11.9)	270 (10.6)	309 (12.2)	269 (10.6)	57 (2.2)	10 (0.4)	2,022 (79.5)
Source: Climate-Data.org (altitude: 62m)

== Gallery ==
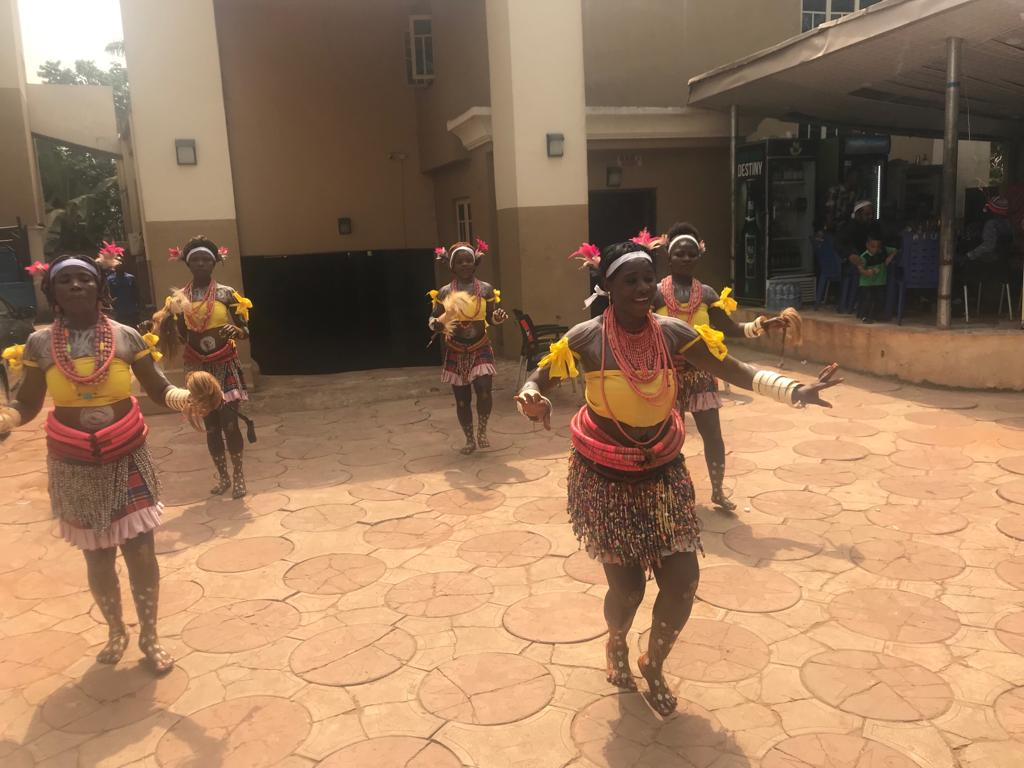
Ehugbo dancers

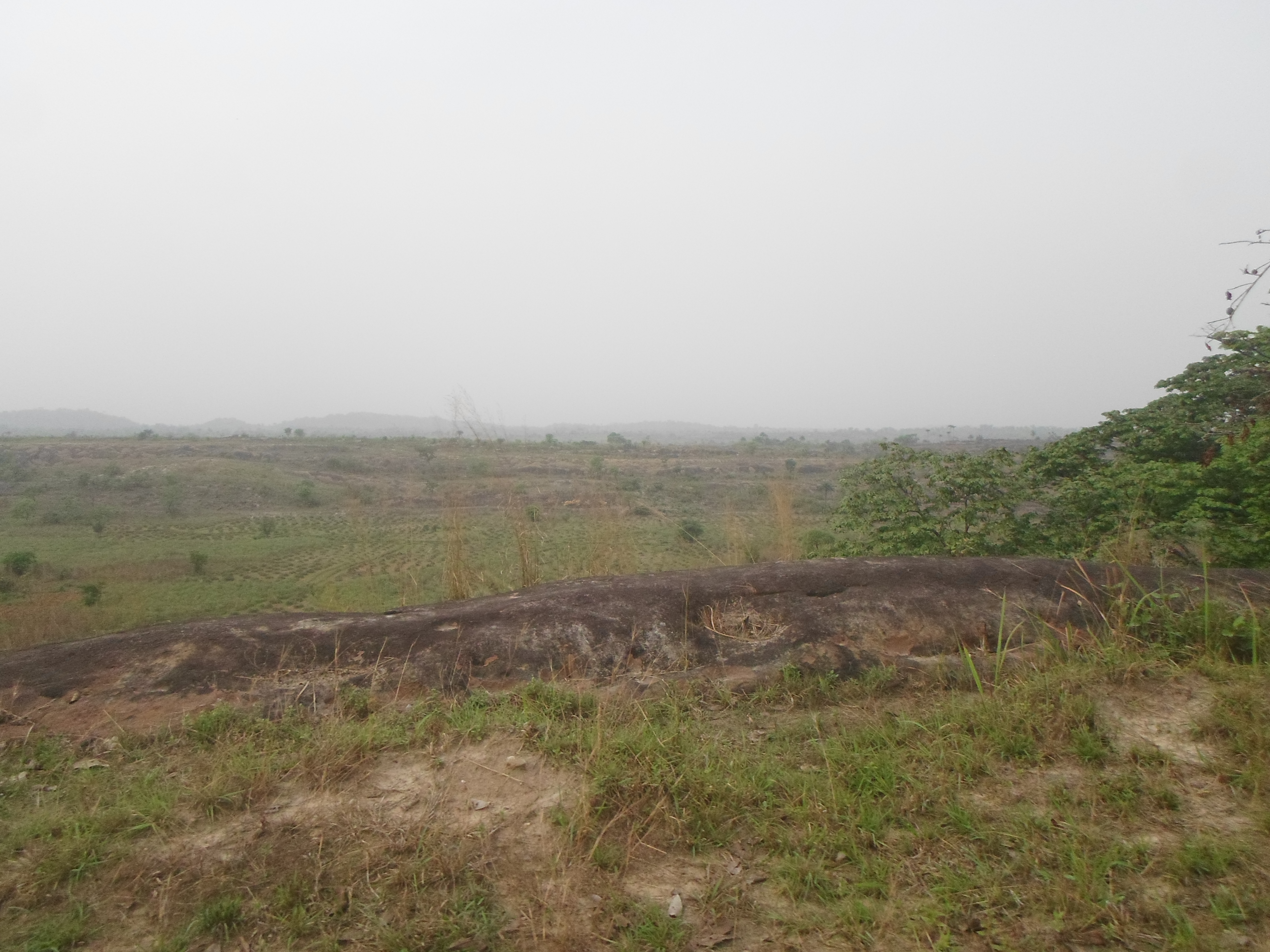
Landscape around Afikpo

== See also ==
- Igbo people
- Okumkpa, African dance of Igbo Afikpo tribes
