= Daniel Nwachukwu =

Nigerian Academic

4th Vice Chancellor of Alex Ekwueme Federal University Ndufu Alike Ikwo

Personal details
- Education: University of Lagos; University of Benin
- Occupation: Academic
- Profession: Academics

Daniel Nwachukwu is a Nigerian professor of Cardiovascular Physiology and the fourth vice chancellor of Alex Ekwueme Federal University, Ndufu-Alike (AE-FUNAI), Ebonyi State. His appointment was announced on 20 December 2025.

== Early life and education ==
Daniel Nwachukwu is from Okposi in Ohaozara, Ebonyi State. He attended Government Secondary School and later concluded it at the Federal School of Arts and Science, Suleja, Niger State in 1988. Nwachukwu obtained his first degree in Human Physiology in 1995 from the University of Lagos and earned his master's degree in 1997 from the University of Benin and later completed his PHD program in 2012.

== Career ==
Nwachukwu began his career as a university lecturer in 1999 at the University of Nigeria, Nsukka where he eventually promoted to the rank of professor in 2016. Until his appointment, he was the immediate past Deputy Vice-Chancellor of the University of Nigeria Enugu Campus (UNEC), a position he assumed in 2023. He was once the HOD of Physiology and the Faculty of Basic Medical Sciences Dean at UNN. He is the first DVC UNEC to come from Ebonyi.

== personal life ==
He is married with children.
