= Peace Ibekwe Abdallah =

Nigerian police officer

- Born: 1963 (age 62–63)
- Occupation: police officer
- Known for: Deputy Inspector General of police
- Parent: Mike Ibekwe

Peace Ibekwe Abdallah (born 1963) is the former Deputy Inspector-General of Police in Nigeria. Before her promotion to a Deputy Inspector General of Police, she was an Assistant Inspector General of Police at the Office of the National Security Adviser, The presidency, Abuja where she contributed to the maintenance of national security. She also served as the commissioner of police in Ebonyi state Nigeria in 2015. As a Commissioner of Police, she dismantled police check points on state roads following complaints from the public that police officers in the check points were corrupt. she also introduced different programmes to reduce crime including operation ‘Show of force' and operation ‘Walk down crime'. she retired from Nigerian Police Force on 28 January 2019

== Personal life ==
Abdallah was born on 7 April 1963 in Odoje village, Onitsha, Anambra State, Nigeria. Her father was Mike Ibekwe, who retired as a commissioner of police in charge of the old East Central State of Nigeria shortly after the Nigerian Civil War ended in 1970.

== Career ==
She was enlisted in the Nigerian Police in 1989 as a cadet ASP. She was appointed the Commissioner of Police in Ebonyi State in 2015. While she was a Commissioner of Police in Ebonyi State, she introduced different programmes to reduce crime including ‘Show of force' and ‘Walk down crime'. She also dismantled police checkpoints in the State roads as many residents complained that policemen at the checkpoints were corrupt. She was given the nick name "NNE Oma (good mother)" of Ebonyi State by riders of commercial motorcycles union in Ebonyi State when she served there as Commissioner of Police. She was later transferred to the Police Headquarters Abuja as Commissioner of Police in charge of Force Intelligence Bureau. The Police Service Commission subsequently approved her promotion at the 27th Plenary Meeting of Police Service Commission which ended in Abuja on Friday, 20 April 2018. she was promoted to the rank of Assistant Inspector General of Police and posted to the Office of the National Security Adviser, The presidency, Abuja. Furthermore, at the Plenary Meeting of the Police Service Commission held in Abuja between 9 and 11 October 2018, the Commission approved the promotion of three Assistant Inspectors-General of Police to the position of Deputy Inspector-General of Police and Peace Abdallah was the only woman among the officers. Her promotion took effect on Thursday, 1 November 2018. She was retired from the service of Nigerian Police following the appointment Muhammed Adamu as a new Inspector General of Police on 15 January 2019. Her retirement was in furtherance to the convention that recommends the retirement of senior police chiefs when an officer junior to them in service or lower in rank is appointed to lead the police force. Seven Deputy Inspectors General and eight Assistant Inspectors-General were identified as having joined the police before Adamu and had to be retired when Adamu was appointed the Inspector General of Police. She retired from Nigerian Police on 28 January 2019.
