= Mgbo people =

Ethnic subgroup in Nigeria

Ngbo
Ndu Ngbo

Total population
- 149,000

Regions with significant populations
- Nigeria: 149,000

Languages
- Ngbolizhia Ngbo

Related ethnic groups
- Izzi, Ezhiulo, Ikwo, Ezza

The Ngbo// are an Igboid ethnic group in Ebonyi state of southeastern Nigeria.
