= Izi language =

Igboid language spoken in Nigeria

Izhi
- Izhi
- Native to: Nigeria
- Region: Ebonyi State
- Native speakers: 540,000 (2012)
- Language family: Niger–Congo?: Atlantic–Congo; Volta–Niger; yeai; Igboid; Nuclear Igboid; Izhi–Iza–Ikwo–Mgbo; Izhi
- Writing system: Latin

Language codes
- ISO 639-3: izh
- Glottolog: izhi1239

Izhi (Izii, Izzi) is an Igboid language spoken in Ebonyi state in Nigeria. It forms a dialect cluster with the closely related languages Ikwo, Ezza, and Mgbo.

== Demographics ==
Speakers of the Izhi language are spread over a large area. Belonging to a larger group of people called the Igbo, the Izhi distinguish themselves from their neighbors and have divided themselves into many clans. Izhi speakers are found east of Abakaliki, the capital of the Ebonyi State and extend as far as the Anambra and Imo State boundaries. Longitudinally, Izhi speakers extend from the Plateau State to approximately 12 miles north of the Cross River, which runs through the appropriately named Cross River State.

The maps on this page highlight the area where Izhi speakers live, showing both the country of Nigeria within the African Continent and the divisions within Nigeria. Izhi's parent group, the Igbo, reside in Southeast Nigeria. The area where the Igbo live has been termed “Igboland.” Though this area is divided by the Niger River, cultural unity is maintained by the Igbo people, as the river provides a convenient means of communication.

== History ==
Research on the origins of the Igbo is limited, but a leading hypothesis is that many different communities immigrated in waves from the West and North to the borders of the central area of Igboland. These waves of immigration may have begun as early as the 5th century when they split off from the Ekumaenyi heartland ( in todays Onueke of Ezza the heartland of Ekumaenyi group ). as the area remains the location which Enyi nwegu settled, migration in the more recent past has occurred in all directions, which has welcomed other sojourners to form a homogeneous Igbo culture.

The Portuguese arrived in Igboland in the mid-15th century, and from 1434 to 1807, contact points between European and African traders were established along the Nigerian coast. After slavery was abolished in 1807, the British became aggressive in its practices of industrial trade and imperialism. The British eventually conquered Igboland, and Igbo culture was compromised by British imperialism.

=== Igbo orthography ===
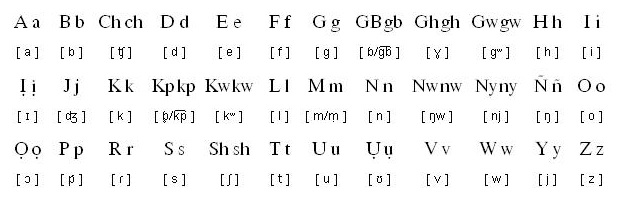
Igbo Alphabet

Before the Arrival of the Portuguese, the Igbo had a pictogram form of writing called “Nsibidi”. That form died out, most likely because many of its users were members of secret societies and did not want it to be public. In 1854, A German philologist named Karl Richard Lepsius made a “Standard Alphabet”, meant for all the languages of the world. In 1882, Britain enacted an educational ordinance to direct the teaching of reading and writing only in English which temporarily inhibited the development of Igbo along with other languages of West Africa.

Controversy over Igbo orthography began in 1927, when the International Institute of African Languages and Cultures (IIALC) published a pamphlet, "Practical Orthography of African Languages". Consonants /gw/, /kw/, and /nw/ were added to represent Igbo sounds. The pamphlet used some symbols from the International Phonetic Alphabet (IPA), which began a controversy with the missionary society who had used Lepsius's writing for almost 70 years.

In 1929, the Colonial Government Board of Education tried to replace Lepsius with the IIALC's orthography. The government, along with Roman Catholic and Methodist missionaries, accepted and adopted the new orthography; however, other Protestant missionaries opposed it. A standard alphabet based on a central dialect was proposed in 1944 by Dr. Ida Ward, but the controversy continued, and a resolution was made to use the new alphabet only for government literature.

A standard form was agreed upon by 1962 and is still in use today. In 1972, a standardization committee met to expand the Igbo language, borrowing words from various dialects other than the central one, the idea for a Standard Igbo being meant to be spoken and understood by all Igbo speakers.

Between 1973 and 1976, the standardization committee's recommendations for Igbo spelling were approved, and new suggestions for the rearrangement of the Igbo alphabet were taken into consideration. The standard Igbo orthography that is currently in use is based on the dialects of Owerri and Umuahia. The alphabet is shown below along with the IPA transcriptions.

== Vocabulary ==
Comparing Izhi, Ezaa, and Ikwo reveals that these dialects share about 95% of their vocabulary. However, comparisons with the Central Igbo language showed only an 80% consistency in lexical items. Since Izhi, Ezaa, and Ikwo are mutually intelligible with each other but not with Central Igbo, they are classified as one language separate from the Central Igbo language. However, some of the words in Izhi are cognates of Central Igbo.

== Phonology ==
=== Consonants ===
Izhi contains 26 consonant phonemes classified under six manners of articulation and five places of articulation which are shown in the chart below. Consonants are also distinguished by voicing. Both voiced and voiceless stops occur in labial, alveolar, velar, and labio-velar places of articulation. There are also corresponding nasals for each of these places of articulation. Fricatives are always labials, alveolars, and velars; affricates are always labials and alveolars. Izhi has both a lateral and non-lateral liquid, but some speakers replace the non-lateral with the lateral liquid.

Table 1. Consonant Inventory
		Labial	Alveolar	Palatal	Velar	Labio-velar
Nasals		m	n		ŋ	ŋm
Stops	Vl	p	t		k	kp
Stops	Vd	b	d		ɡ	ɡb
Affricates	Vl	pf	ts			
Affricates	Vd	bv	dz			
Fricatives	Vl	ɸ ~ f	s		x	
Fricatives	Vd	β ~ v	z		ɣ	
Liquids	Lateral		l			
Liquids	Central		ɹ			
Semivowels				j		w

=== Vowels ===
Izhi has an average vowel inventory. There are nine vowel phonemes in Izhi, including the canonical vowels and two more front vowels and two more back vowels. Below is a table of the vowels divided by their places of articulation in the oral cavity as well as the position of the root of the tongue:

Table 2. Vowel Inventory:
	(Position of tongue root)	Front	Central	Back
High	Advanced	i		u
High	Retracted	ɪ		ʊ
Mid	Advanced	e		o
Mid	Retracted	ɛ		ɔ
Low			a	

=== Syntagmatic features ===
Syntagmatic features are related to the syntactic relationship between morphological or phonological units. In Izhi, every syllable is marked with one or more features of pitch and quality. The three features of quality in Izhi are palatalization, labialization, and neutral. They are regarded as syllable features for several reasons but most importantly since they cause contrast between syllables rather than between individual phonemes.

Palatalization is phonetically realized as strong palatal friction or as slight vowel fronting in the syllable and occurs if a syllable margin is a palatal /j/ and sometimes when the margin is an alveolar consonant (with the exception of liquids) or bilabial stops. For example, /jɔ̀/ 'to shake a rattle' and /àpjà/, 'a bird' are marked by the palatalization feature because they contain a syllable with a /j/ margin.

The labialization feature is phonetically realized by the semivowel /w/ between a consonant margin and a vowel nucleus, as in /ákwɔ̀/ 'razor'. It can also occur when the syllable margin is a velar stop, nasal or liquid. The contrast in meaning is exemplified by comparing it to the word /ákɔ̀ / 'story'. Lip rounding occurs throughout the entire syllable of /ákwɔ̀/, which differentiates it from /ákɔ̀/.

The neutral feature is simply the absence of the other two features of quality. There are no consonant margin restrictions other than the absence of /w/ and /j/ margins found in syllables marked by the labialization and palatalization features. An example of a neutral syllable is /únú/ 'salt'.

=== Syllable structure ===
There are two distinguished types of syllable structures in Izi: CVN, whose the consonant onset and nasal coda are optional, and N, which consists of a syllabic nasal. Thus, the five possible combinations are V, CV, VN, CVN, N (V is a vowel, C a consonant, and N, a syllabic nasal. There are a few syllable restrictions in Izi:

- Consonants /pf/ and /bv/ are always in syllables with nuclei consisting of a high back vowel and are marked by the neutral feature.
- Consonant /ŋm/ is always between vowels /e/, /a/ and /o/ and is marked by the neutral feature.
- High front vowels do not occur in syllables with labialisation and syllables with the neutral feature and consonant margins consisting of fricatives, velar and labio-velar nasals, and stops (except /ɡb/).
- High back vowels do not occur in syllables with palatalisation and syllables with the neutral feature and a consonant margin of /ŋm/.

=== Tone system ===
Izhi, like many Niger–Congo languages, has a two-tone system, a high tone and a low tone. Low tone has two variations: raising low tone (L) and non-raising low tone (^L). High tone has only raised high (R). The tone system also has three features: downstep (!), upstep (^) and latent low (‘ placed before the word). Rules for the operation of the tonal variations are as follows:

- There is a two-way phonemic contrast after a low tone. Thus, a low tone may be followed by another low tone or a high tone.
- A three-way phonemic contrast exists after a high tone, which may be followed by another high tone, a low tone, or a downstep to another high tone.

Tone can often change meaning. /eka/, pronounced with a high tone followed by a high tone, means 'hand'. However, with two low tones, it means 'worm'. It changes again to mean 'notch mark' when it is pronounced with a high tone followed by a low tone. Finally is a fourth meaning when the high tone follows the low tone, 'place'.

== Morphology ==
Izhi is a fairly isolating language, and it has equal suffixing and prefixing, as in the following example.

sʊ́ ɪꜜjá lɛ ɔ̀ɔ́ ńdʊ́ mkpùkpú ̂ànji ́kùrù mí́tìná ònó
Say him that {it is} people village our called meeting that
'Tell him it is the people of our village who called that meeting.'

Instead of the morphemes combining to form one sentence, each morpheme in the sentence is unconnected, which suggests that Izi is an isolating language. The sentence also reveals that the word order of this language is subject–verb–object (SVO), like English. The sentence means 'It is people'.

== Syntax ==
Another feature illustrated by the sentence is the order of nouns and genitives, and nouns and demonstratives, which are head-initial, and the noun head comes before both the genitive and the demonstrative. For instance, in the sentence, 'village' appears before 'our', and 'meeting' appears before 'that'. Adjectives usually precede the noun but can follow it.

The order of the adposition in relation to the order of the object and verb is typical. Izi, like other languages whose verb precedes the object reference. The following shows the preposition-object relationship:

é, lɛ́ mgbábʊ̀ lɛ ɛ̀ká ònó
yes, in garden in place that
'Yes, in the garden there.'

ḿꜜbʊ́ ndʊ kɛ ónjìkwá
meaning people of Onyikwa?
'You mean Onyikwa people?'
