= Ebonyi State College of Education =

State government higher education institution in Ikwo, Nigeria

- Type: Public
- Established: 2001
- Affiliations: Ebonyi State University
- Provost: Benedict Edigbo Mbam
- Location: Ikwo, Ebonyi State, Nigeria

The Ebonyi State College of Education is a state government higher education institution located in Ikwo, Ebonyi State, Nigeria. It is affiliated to Ebonyi State University for its degree programmes. The current Provost is Benedict Edigbo Mbam.

== History ==
The Ebonyi State College of Education was established in 2001. It was formerly a College of Agriculture which originated from the Norwegian Church Agricultural Project (NORCAP).

== Courses ==
The institution offers the following courses;

- Computer Education
- Economics
- Christian Religious Studies
- Igbo
- Geography
- Physical And Health Education
- Mathematics Education
- Fine And Applied Arts
- Biology Education
- Political Science
- Chemistry Education
- English Education
- Fisheries Technology
- Agricultural Science Education
- History
- Integrated Science Education
