= Ikwo (local government area) =

- LGA, City
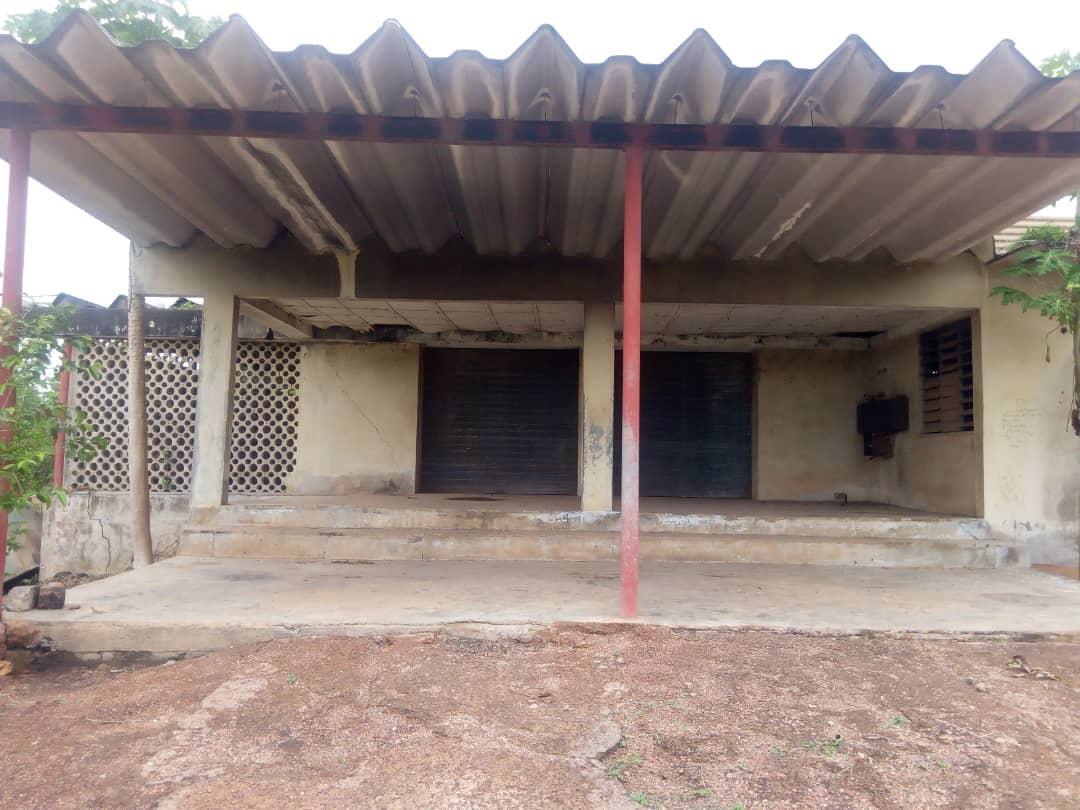
- Ikwo post office
- Interactive map of Ikwo
- Coordinates: 12.473°N 7.487°E
- Country: Nigeria
- State: Ebonyi State
- Headquarters: Onu-Ebonyi Echara

Government
  - Local Government Chairman: Barr. Sunday Nwankwo

Area
  - Total: 500 km^{2} (190 sq mi)
- Time zone: UTC+1 (WAT)

Ikwo is the largest Local Government Area in Ebonyi State. It is situated on the eastern part of the state. The city and local government area has a land mass of approximately 500 square kilometres (190 sq mi) and shares a border with Abakaliki, Izzi and Ezza Local Government Areas as well as Cross River State. It is the home land of a former Governor of the state Chief Martin Elechi. Ikwo is the home to Alex Ekwueme Federal University Ndufu Alike Ikwo (FUNAI) One of the Universities established by president Goodluck Jonathan. Ikwo also plays host to Ebonyi State College of Education, Ikwo at Ndufu Echara.

The local government headquarters is at Onu-Ebonyi Echara.

Ikwo has a boundary with Cross River State.

The Ikwo an Igboid language is generally spoken.

== See also ==
- Ikwo people
- List of governors of Ebonyi State
