= Evangel University, Okpoto =

Evangel University, Akaeze
- Motto: Education for the total man
- Type: Private
- Established: 2012
- Affiliations: Assemblies of God
- Academic affiliations: Federal Teaching Hospital, Abakaliki
- Chairman: Dr. Sam Egwu
- Vice-Chancellor: Prof. I.U. Kalu
- Academic staff: 173
- Students: Full-time equivalent
- Location: Kilometre 48, Enugu-Abakaliki Expressway , Akaeze, Ebonyi state, Nigeria
- Campus: * Okpoto; Akaeze
- Website: www.evangeluniversity.edu.ng

Evangel University, Akaeze (EUA) is a private Christian university in Ebonyi State. It is owned by the Assemblies of God Christian denomination. The university was licensed in February, 2012 and commenced academic activities on 27 November 2012 for the 2012/2013 academic session. The university began operation at its take-off campus in Okpoto with two colleges and one school. It has since been extended to four colleges while work is ongoing in view of a planned move to its permanent campus at Akaeze.

Full accreditation was obtained from the National Universities Commission, NUC in 2016. The school is one of Nigeria's least expensive private universities. A 2016 survey report by Economic Confidential described Evangel University as one of the less popular destinations for students seeking admission to higher institutions.

== Location ==
The takeoff campus of Evangel University is located at Okpoto, 48 km east of Enugu along Enugu-Abakaliki Expressway (Highway A341) in Ebonyi State, Nigeria.

The main campus is under construction at Akaeze, Ebonyi state at the previously disputed Igboro section which lies between Ivo local government and Afikpo south local government.

== Constituent Colleges ==
There are four colleges and one school

1. College of Management Sciences
2. College of Health Sciences
3. College of Science
4. College of the Arts
5. College of Social Sciences
6. School of General Studies
