= Nwoke Victor Chidi =

Nigerian politician

Nwoke Victor Chidi is a Nigerian politician. He currently serves as a member representing Abakaliki North Constituency in the Ebonyi State House of Assembly.
