= Ebisike =

Ebisike is a surname. Notable people with the surname include:

- Chimaobi Ebisike (fl. 2019), Nigerian politician
- Christian Ebisike (died 2018), Nigerian Anglican bishop
