= Chacha Eke =

Nigerian actress

Chacha Eke Faani
- Born: Charity Chinonso Eke; 17 July 1987 (age 39); Ebonyi State, Nigeria
- Education: Ebonyi State University
- Occupation: Actress
- Years active: 2009–present
- Known for: Acting
- Notable work: C.E.O Print-Afrique Fashion Ltd
- Spouse: Austin Ikechukwu Faani (m. 2013)
- Children: 4

Charity Eke, popularly known as Chacha Eke Faani, is a Nigerian actress from Ebonyi State, a state in the southeastern part of Nigeria. Her rise to fame came when she starred in the 2012 drama film, The End is Near.

== Education ==
She had her basic education at ESUT Nursery & Primary school in Ebonyi State and completed her secondary school education at Our Lord Shepherd International School in Enugu State. She graduated from Ebonyi State University with a B.Sc. degree in accountancy.

== Personal life ==
Chacha Eke suffered a chemical reaction disorder in the brain making her dislike her Mother when she was young. Chacha was once married to Austin Faani for nine years but announced on air that it was over. Her struggles with Bipolar Disorder makes her despise her husband. The Actress is a Mother of four Children.

== Selected filmography ==
- The End is Near (2012)
- Commander in Chief
- Clap of Thunder
- Two Hearts (2011)
- Beach 24
- Gift of Pain
- A Cry for Justice
- Jewels of the Sun
- Bloody Carnival
- Cleopatra
- Dance For The Prince (2011) as Udoka
- Mirror of Life
- Innocent Pain
- Bridge of Contract
- Palace of Sorrow
- Secret Assassins
- Royal Assassins
- The Promise
- Valley of Tears
- Village Love
- Weeping Angel
- Rosa my Village Love
- My Rising Sun
- My Sweet Love
- Secret Palace Mission
- Stubborn Beans
- Bitter Heart
- Shame to Bad People
- Beauty of the gods
- Pure Heart
- Rope of Blood
- Hand of Destiny
- Lucy
- Sound of Ikoro
- Omalicha
- Palace of Sorrow (2013)
- Basket of Sorrow
- Festival of Sorrow
- Kamsi the Freedom Fighter
- Pot of Riches
- Girls at War
- Crossing the Battle Line
- Money Works With Blood
- Happy Never After
- Who Took My Husband
- Roasted Alive
- Song of Love
- My Only Inheritance
- Royal First lady
- Beyond Beauty
- After the Altar
- Bloody Campus
- Princess's Revenge

Bondage

- ’’My Last Blood’’
- " Dangerous Assassin (2015) as Anita
- "Black Val (2016) as Hilda

== Personal life ==
Eke is the daughter of Ebonyi State Commissioner for Education, Professor John Eke. She married Austin Faani Ikechukwu a movie director in 2013; the couple has four children (three girls and a boy). In June 2022, she announced the end of her marriage to Austin Faani.

== See also ==
- List of people from Ebonyi State
