= Chinedum Nwajiuba =

Nigerian agricultural economist

Prof. Chinedum Nwajiubam

Was The Vice-Chancellor of Federal University Ndufu Alike Ikwo in Ebonyi, Nigeria
- Preceded by: Prof. Oyewusi Ibidapo Obe
- Succeeded by: Prof. Oge Elom

Personal details
- Born: Chinedum Nwajiuba was born in Port Harcourt, Rivers State, Nigeria
- Education: University of Nigeria, Nsukka; University of Hohenheim
- Occupation: Academic; author
- Profession: Economist

Chinedum Uzoma Nwajiuba (born 1964) is a Nigerian academic and a professor of agricultural economics. He was the Vice-Chancellor of the Federal University Ndufu Alike Ikwo in Ebonyi, Nigeria.

== Education ==
Nwajiuba was born in Port Harcourt and studied at the University of Nigeria, Nsukka, where he obtained his BSc.Agric in 1986 and also later his MSc in Agricultural Economics in 1989. He proceeded to the University of Hohenheim, Germany for further studies, where he earned his PhD in Agricultural Economics in 1994. He later went to Imo State University where he acquired another MSc in Development economics in the year 2007.

== Career ==
Chinedum Nwajiuba has previously worked as a part-time lecturer at the Michael Okpara University of Agriculture, Umudike, and additionally as an External Examiner to the university. In 2009/2010 he also worked as an adjunct lecturer at the Federal University of Technology Owerri. He has also been on the Governing Council of the Imo State University Teaching Hospital.

== Positions held ==
Nwajiuba held the position of Deputy Dean to the Faculty of Agriculture and Veterinary Medicine from October 2005 to December 2005. Later, he held the position of Director of the Information Communication Technology Centre from January 2008 to February 2009. He then became Director of Academic Planning until December 2009. Nwajiuba was acting Vice-Chancellor of the university in 2012, as well as Dean to the School of Postgraduate Studies from November 2011 till February 2016.

== Services ==
Chinedum as served (part-time) in the Nigerian Environmental Study Action Team (NEST) Ibadan as the Executive Director.

== Personal life ==
Prof. Chinedum Nwajiuba is married to Dr. (Mrs,) Chinyere Nwajiuba and has children.
