= Frank Ogbuewu =

Frank Nchita Ogbuewu
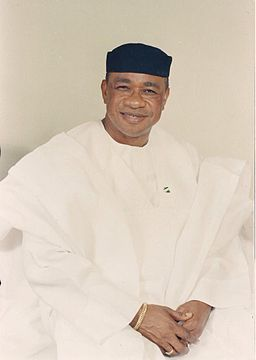

Politician

Chairman (Mayor), Ikwo Local Government Area
- In office April 1994 – May 1996
- Preceded by: Livinus Nwambe

Nigeria Ambassador to Greece
- In office February 1999 – May 2003

Federal Minister of Culture and Tourism
- In office July 2003 – June 2006
- Succeeded by: Femi Fani-Kayode

Personal details
- Born: 12 December 1953 (age 72) Abina - Amagu, Ikwo LGA, Ebonyi State, Nigeria
- Party: People's Democratic Party (PDP)
- Spouse(s): Eunice Ebin Ogbuewu and Rebecca Ogbuewu
- Education: BSc. Business Administration

Frank Nchita Ogbuewu (born 12 December 1953) is a Nigerian political figure and a former Minister of Culture and Tourism for the country. His appointment as minister was confirmed in July 2003 by the Obasanjo administration. Frank Ogbuewu is on record as being the longest serving minister of the culture and tourism ministry in the Obasanjo administration. Prior to his appointment as minister of culture and tourism, he served as Nigeria's ambassador to Greece and was also a one time Chairman (1994–1996) of his local government council, Ikwo. His appointment as chairman (mayor) of Ikwo Local Government shot him into the political lime light and he has continued to be a proponent of youth development in his state. Ogbuewu who until August 2010 was a member of the ruling People's Democratic Party (PDP) sought his former party's gubernatorial ticket in 2007 against incumbent governor of Ebonyi State, Chief Martin Elechi but lost. He later vied for the PDP national chairmanship position but was not successful. On August 28, 2010, during the traditional marriage of his oldest daughter, Nnenna Ogbuewu, the Ambassador announced his intention to vie once again, for the office of governor in his home state of Ebonyi but this time, under a different party. His party of choice, the All Progressives Grand Alliance was made known in September 2010. On January 12, 2011, Ambassador Ogbuewu was nominated by the All Progressives Grand Alliance with a total vote of 1852 to represent the party in the April 16, 2011 gubernatorial election.

== Brief family history ==
Ambassador Frank Ogbuewu was born on December 12, 1953, in Ikwo Local Government Area in Ebonyi State, Nigeria, and is the last born of his mother Oginyi Nchita. His father was a traditionalist who specialized in native herbal treatment as well as being a reputable hunter. A one time monogamist, Ambassador Ogbuewu now has seven children from two wives. The first four (3 boys and a girl) are from his first wife, Mrs. Eunice Ebin Ogbuewu. Eunice, a native of Etung Local Government Area in Cross River State was legally married to Ogbuewu for 22+ years before their separation. Ogbuewu was left with the second wife, Mrs. Rebecca Ogbuewu, a native of Ezza LGA with whom he has 3 children.

== Political career ==
Ogbuewu's venture into politics came as a surprise to both his family and friends. A former Nigeria Immigration Service officer, Ogbuewu retired from service as an Assistant Superintendent of Immigration. While in retirement, he registered as a member of the defunct National Republican Convention (N. R. C) party to enable him run for political office. His first attempt was the local government chairmanship position in his native local government area. Ogbuewu took his campaign to every nook and cranny of his LGA but his efforts were soon stopped as the electoral process was circumvented by the then military administration of late General Sani Abacha in 1993. In 1994, Ogbuewu was later appointed as chairman, Caretaker Committee for his Local Government Area, Ikwo. The tenure lasted for two years. After the death of General Sani Abacha and the appointment of General Abdulsalami Abubakar (rtd) as Nigeria's military head of state, registration of new political parties commenced and elections were scheduled to be held in Nigeria for a civilian hand over. Ogbuewu registered as a member of the defunct All People's Party to contest the gubernatorial election but lost in the primaries to Chief Ogbonnaya Onu, who was Chairman of the Party. Ogbuewu was to later join the People Democratic Party (PDP) and was instrumental to the successful election of Dr. Sam Egwu as the first governor of the young state. In 1999, Ogbuewu was nominated for an ambassadorial position which was ratified by the senate. He was tasked with re-opening Nigeria's embassy in Greece which had been shut down for quite some time. Ogbuewu served as Nigeria's Ambassador to Greece from 1999 to 2003.

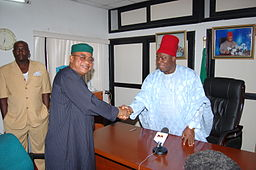
Ambassador Ogbuewu at APGA's Secretariat delivering his Gubernatorial expression form and meeting with APGA's Chairman, Chief Umeh

In 2003, the Obasanjo administration recalled him back to Nigeria to head the ministry of Culture and Tourism. In 2006, Ambassador Ogbuewu resigned his position as Nigeria's minister of culture and tourism to contest the 2007 gubernatorial election in Ebonyi State under the umbrella of the People Democratic Party (PDP). The gubernatorial primaries which had about thirteen (13) PDP aspirants including the incumbent governor, Chief Martin Elechi ended up being a contest between just two individuals. It is on record that Ogbuewu was the only candidate who refused to step down and accept a sole candidacy of Chief Elechi at the primaries held in the township stadium, Abakaliki. Ogbuewu lost the primaries as he polled just over 580 votes compared to Elechi's over 2000 delegate votes. In 2008, after an unsuccessful gubernatorial bid, Ambassador Ogbuewu expressed interest in the Peoples Democratic Party's national chairmanship position that was zoned to the south eastern states of Abia, Imo, Ebonyi, Anambra and Enugu. Notable politicians like Emmanuel Iwuanyanwu, former Senate President Pius Anyim and Ex-Governor of Ebonyi State, Dr. Sam Egwu also indicated interest in the position. Ebonyi State seemed to be the favoured state of all the five South Eastern State but the state governor was not disposed to the candidacy of any of the aspirants from his state.

== See also ==
- List of people from Ebonyi State
