= IQW =

IQW or iqw may refer to:

- IQW, the Telegraph code for Shuangliu West railway station, Chengdu, Sichuan, China
- iqw, the ISO 639-3 code for Ikwo language, Ebonyi State, Nigeria
