= Maria Ude Nwachi =

Nigerian politician

State Representative
- In office 2015–2019
- Constituency: Afikpo North East

Personal details
- Party: People's Democratic Party (Nigeria) (PDP)
- Occupation: Politician, Media Personality

Maria Ude Nwachi is a Nigerian politician and media personality. She served as the Minority Leader representing the Afikpo North East Constituency in the Ebonyi State House of Assembly from 2015 to 2019.

== Political career ==
Nwachi was initially elected to the Ebonyi State House of Assembly on the platform of the Progressive Peoples Alliance (PPA) in 2015. She later defected to the People's Democratic Party (PDP) in 2020.

In 2016, Nwachi was suspended after being accused of sponsoring a protest by Afikpo youth against the Enugu Electricity Distribution Company (EEDC) due to complaints of poor service.

In 2018, Nwachi faced another suspension on charges of "gross misconduct," which included accusations of impersonating a public photographer. Nwachi was suspended on four occasions during her four-year legislative tenure from 2015 to 2019.

== Personal life ==
In 2019, Nwachi adopted Emeka Samuel Ndudi, a 19-year old artist, as her son.

== Awards ==
In 2023, she won the Pulse Africa Facebook Influencer of the Year Award.
