= Priscilla Ekwere Eleje =

Nigerian bank executive

- Born: Afikpo, Ebonyi State, Nigeria
- Education: University of Jos (BSc); Boston University (Fellowship)
- Occupations: Banker, Auditor
- Known for: First female Director of Currency Operations, Central Bank of Nigeria; First female signatory on the Nigerian naira
- Title: Director of Currency Operations, CBN (2018–present)

Priscilla Ekwere Eleje is the first Director of Currency Operations at the Central Bank of Nigeria (CBN). She is the first woman to have her signature appended on the Nigeria Currency, the naira note.

== Background and education ==
Eleje is a native of Afikpo in Ebonyi State. She obtained a Psychology degree at the University of Jos, Plateau State. She attained the Hubert H. Humphrey Fellowship in Banking and Management at Boston University, Massachusetts, USA. Also, she is a Certified Information System Auditor (CISA).

== Career ==
Eleje was appointed as the substantive Director of Currency Operations of the Nigerian apex bank, CBN, in August 2018. Prior to her appointment, she held the position in an acting capacity. The first set of naira currency featuring her signature was the 1000 naira note that came into circulation in 2019. Her appointment was lauded by the several women bodies in Nigeria, most notably the National Council of Women Societies (NCWS), Nigeria.

== See also ==
- List of Igbo people
- List of people from Ebonyi State
- List of people from Afikpo
