= 2011 clashes in Ebonyi State =

2011 clashes in Ebonyi State of Nigeria took place between the Ezza and Ezilo peoples due to a land dispute. At least 50 people were killed. Riot police was deployed to the area.
