= Chigozie Ogbu =

Nigerian politician

Vice-Chancellor of Ebonyi State University
- In office 2017–2025
- Preceded by: Francis Idike
- Succeeded by: Michael Ugota Awoke

Personal details
- Occupation: Academic, politician
- Known for: Former Deputy Governor of Ebonyi State

Chigozie Ogbu is a Nigerian academic and a former Vice Chancellor of Ebonyi State University. He was appointed by the Governor of Ebonyi State David Umahi to replace Prof. Francis Idike. His tenure ended in 2025 and he was succeeded by Professor Michael Ugota Awoke.
