= Ebonyi State International Airport =

State owned airport in Ebonyi state, Nigeria

- IATA: none; ICAO: DNEB

Summary
- Airport type: Public
- Owner: Ebonyi State Government
- Serves: Abakaliki
- Location: Onueke
- Opened: 13 June 2025; 13 months ago
- Coordinates: 06°11′49″N 008°01′05″E
- Interactive map of Ebonyi State International Airport

Runways
Direction	Length		Surface
Direction	m	ft	Surface
05/23	3,100	10,171	Asphalt

Ebonyi State International Airport is an airport located in Onueke, Abakaliki, Ebonyi State, Nigeria, along the Abakaliki-Afikpo Expressway. The airport was commissioned by the administration of Dave Umahi in 2023.

The airport is meant to service Ebonyi, Abia, Benue and part of Cross River states. The airport is owned and operated by the Ebonyi state government.

The airport was initially called Muhammadu Buhari International Airport, named after the former president of Nigeria.

The airport recorded its first flight in April 2023.

The airport is the fastest airport in Nigeria to get its licence and approval from the Nigerian regulatory bodies and the first airport in Nigeria to have its runway constructed on a rigid pavement of 1 foot thickness and coated with asphalt of 7 inches thickness, making it one of the world strongest and best runway in recent time that can accommodate and land any size of aircraft

The airport is 133,000 square metres (1,430,000 sq ft; 159,000 sq yd) in land area and has a runway of about 4 km (2.5 mi)

The cost of building the airport was shouldered by the Ebonyi State government and funds from the constituency projects of the state’s lawmakers.
