= Mgbo language =

Igboid language spoken by the Mgbo people in Ebonyi state in Nigeria

Mgbo
- Mgbolizhia
- Native to: Nigeria
- Region: Ebonyi State, Benue State
- Ethnicity: Mgbo people
- Native speakers: 190,000 (2012)
- Language family: Niger–Congo?: Atlantic–Congo; Volta-Congo; Volta–Niger; yeai; Igboid; Nuclear Igboid; Izi–Ezaa–Ikwo–Mgbo; Mgbo
- Writing system: Latin

Language codes
- ISO 639-3: gmz
- Glottolog: mgbo1238

The Mgbo language, 'Mgbolizhia', is an Igboid language spoken by the Mgbo people in Ebonyi state in Nigeria. It forms a dialect cluster with closely related Izii, Ezza, and Ikwo languages though they are only marginally mutually intelligible.
