= Security vote in Nigeria =

Allocation for security

Security vote in Nigeria is a monthly allowance that is allocated to the 36 states within the Federal Republic of Nigeria for the sole purpose of funding security services within such states. The monthly fund runs into billions of naira and vary based on the level of security required by the individual state.

The state governments are advised to use their discretion in ways on how to spend the funds.

== Security votes by states ==
=== South East ===
Imo State: N333.333M Monthly (N4B Annually)

Enugu State: N600M Monthly (N7.2B Annually)

Anambra State: N850M Monthly (N10B Annually)

Abia State: N700M Monthly (N8.4B Annually)

*Ebonyi State: No Record Available

=== South South ===
Cross River State: N500M Monthly (N6B Annually)

Rivers State: N1.5B Monthly (N18B Annually)

Akwa Ibom State: N1.8B Monthly (N21.6B Annually)

Edo State: N900M Monthly (N10.8B Annually)

Delta State: N2B Monthly (N24B Annually)

*Bayelsa State: No Record Available

=== South West ===
Lagos State: N1.429B Monthly [N1.297B (Public order and safety) + N132.5M (Social Protection)] (N17.149B Annually [N15.559B + N1.59B])

Ondo State: N600M Monthly (N7.2B Annually)

Osun State: N400M Monthly (N4.8B Annually)

Ogun State: N80-N100M Monthly (N960M-N1.2B Annually)

Ekiti State: N100M Monthly (N1.2B annually)

Oyo State: N1B Monthly (12B annually)

=== North East ===
Borno State: N806.25M Monthly (N9.675B Annually)

Yobe State: N316.667M Monthly (N3.8B Annually)

Taraba State: N200M Monthly (N2.4B Annually)

Bauchi State: N1.417B Monthly (N17B Annually)

=== Norht West ===
Kano State: N0.00

Kaduna State: N400M Monthly [N175M (Security vote) + N225M (Security Vote (Preventive and Supportive) for the SSG's office)] N4.8B Annually [N2.1B + N2.7B]

Katsina State: N17.583M Monthly (N211M Annually)

Zamfara State: N600M Monthly (N7.2B Annually)

=== North Central ===
Benue State: N3.092B allocation to personnel and overhead costs monthly which cover security vote, among others. (N37.1B Annually)

Niger State: N1.308B Monthly (N15.7B Annually)

Plateau State: N216.667M Monthly (N2.6B Annually)

Kogi State: N400M Monthly (N4.8B Annually)

Nasarawa State: N100M Monthly (N1.2B annually)

*Kwara State: No Record Available
