= Federal Polytechnic, Nekede =

Polytechnic in Nekede, Owerri West, Nigeria

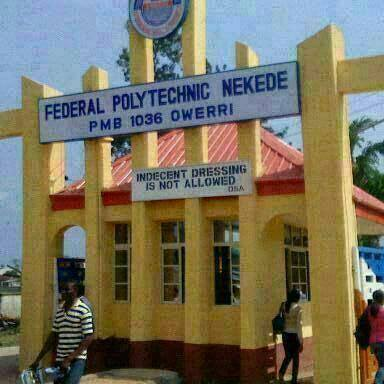
- Motto: Knowledge and Skill for Service
- Type: Public
- Established: 1978; 48 years ago
- Rector: Dr (Mrs) Basilia Igbokwe
- Location: Nekede, Imo State, Nigeria; 5.4339°N 7.0301°E
- Campus: Urban
- Website: www.fpno.edu.ng

The Federal Polytechnic, Nekede is a federal government-owned higher education institution located in Nekede, Owerri West local government area, Imo State, south-eastern Nigeria. It was established on a temporary site at the premise of Government Technical College by the Imo State government in 1978 as the College of Technology, Owerri before it was moved to its present location in Nekede. On April 7, the Polytechnic was changed to a federal government institution and was named "The Federal Polytechnic, Nekede." The Federal Polytechnic, Nekede offers National Diploma and Higher National Diploma courses at undergraduate levels.

On October 3, 2018, Rev. Engr. Dr. Michael Arimanwa was installed as the eighth Rector of the Polytechnic and the first alumnus Rector of Federal Polytechnic, Nekede. Rev. Engr. Dr. Micheal Arimanwa is a priest who works in the civil engineering department. He formerly served as the departmental head and as the school of engineering's dean.

== Library ==
The library supports the teaching and learning process, and helps students and staff for research purposes.

== Schools/faculties ==
Federal Polytechnic, Nekede has seven schools (faculties) of study:

- School of Engineering Technology (SET)
- School of Industrial and Applied Science (SIAS)
- School of Business and Management Technology (SBMT)
- School of General Studies (SGS)
- School of Environmental Design and Technology (SEDT)
- School of Agriculture and Agricultural Technology (SAAT)
- School of Information and Communication Technology (SICT)
- School of Health and Related Technology (SHRT)

== Departments ==
The departments available in the above faculties comprises the following:

School	Departments
School of Engineering Technology (SET)	Agricultural and Bioenvironmental Engineering; Chemical Engineering; Civil Engineering; Computer Engineering; Electrical/Electronics Engineering; Mechanical Engineering; Mechatronics Engineering; Mineral and Petroleum Engineering; Material and Metallurgical Engineering; Welding and Fabrication Engineering
School of Industrial and Applied Science (SIAS)	Science Laboratory Technology; Food Technology; Mathematics and Statistics; Fisheries Technology; Hospitality Management; Agricultural Technology; Printing Technology
School of Business and Management Technology (SBMT)	Accountancy; Business Administration and Management; Banking and Finance; Cooperative Economics and Management; Marketing; Office Technology and Management; Public Administration; Procurement and Supply Chain Management; Taxation
School of General Studies (SGS)	Mass Communication
School of Agriculture and Agricultural Technology (SAAT)	Agricultural Technology; Animal Health and Production Technology; Fisheries Technology
School of Environmental Design and Technology (SEDT)	Architecture Technology; Building Technology; Estate Management Technology; Quantity Surveying Technology; Urban And Regional Planning Technology; Surveying And Geo-Informatics Technology; Arts And Design Technology
School of Information and Communication Technology (SICT)	Computer Science; Library and Information Science
School of Health and Related Technology (SHRT)	Pharmaceutical Technology; Dispensing Opticianry

In 2022, Federal Polytechnic, Nekede commenced six new academic programs, including:

- HND Art and Design (Ceramics)
- HND Art and Design (Sculpture)
- HND Art and Design (Textile)

== See also ==
- List of polytechnics in Nigeria
- List of federal polytechnics in South East Nigeria
