= Igboid languages =

Branch of the YEAI Languages

Igboid
- Geographic distribution: South central Nigeria, lower reaches of the Niger River and east, south of the Benue
- Linguistic classification: Niger–Congo?: Atlantic–Congo; Volta-Congo; Volta-Niger; Igboid
- Proto-language: Proto-Igboid

Language codes
- Glottolog: igbo1258

The Igboid languages constitute a branch of the Volta–Niger language family.

Williamson and Blench conclude that the Igboid languages form a "language cluster" that are somewhat mutually intelligible. Igboid languages are spoken by over 40 million people.

== Names and locations ==
Below is a list of language names, populations, and locations from Blench (2019).

Language	Cluster	Dialects	Alternate spellings	Own name for language	Endonym(s)	Other names (location-based)	Other names for language	Exonym(s)	Speakers	Location(s)
Ịka		Agbor (standard form)	Ìḳá			Agbor				Delta State, Ika and Orhionmwon LGAs
Enuani		Akwukwu-Igbo, Illah, Ebu, Okpanam, Atuma, Ukala-Okpunor, Ukala-Okwute, Ogbe-Onihe, Asaba, Oko-Amakom, Oko-Anala, Okwe, Igbuzo, Ogwashi-Uku, Ubulu-Uku, Ubulu-Okiti, Ubulu-Unor, Ubulu-Ogume, Ubulu-Isiogogo, Onicha-Olona, Onicha-Ugbo, Onicha-Uku, Idumuje-Unor, Idumuje-Ugboko, Issele-Uku, Issele-Azagba...	Enuani							Delta State, Oshimili (North/South), Aniocha (North/South) LGAs
Ikwere		Northern dialets: Elele, Apanị, Ọmerelu, Ubima, Isiokpo, Ọmagwa (Ọmegwa), Ipo, Ọmudioga, Ọmuanwa, Igwuruta, Egbeda, Alụu, Ịbaa; Southern dialects: Akpọ–Mgbu–Tolu, Ọbio, Ọgbakiri, Rụmuji, Ndele, Emọhua	Ikwerre		Ìwhuruò`hnà				54,600 (1950 F&J); possibly 200,000 (SIL)	Rivers State, Ikwerre, Emohua, Port Harcourt and Obio–Akpor LGAs
Ogbah		Egnih (East Ogbah), South Ogbah, West Ogbah	Ogba						22,750 (1950 F&J)	Rivers State, Ahoada LGA
Ẹkpẹyẹ		According to clan names: Ako, Upata, Ubye, Igbuduya					Ekpeye, Ekpabya (by Abua), Ekkpahia, Ekpaffia		20,000 (1953); 50,000 (1969 Clark)	Rivers State, Ahoada LGA
Ụkwuanị–Aboh–Ndọnị cluster	Ụkwuanị–Aboh–Ndọnị								150,000 (SIL)	Delta State, Ndokwa LGA; Rivers State, Ahoada LGA
Ụkwuanị	Ụkwuanị–Aboh–Ndọnị	Utaaba, Emu, Abbi, Obiaruku	Ukwani, Ukwali, Kwale							Delta State, Ndokwa LGA
Aboh	Ụkwuanị–Aboh–Ndọnị		Eboh							Delta State, Ndokwa LGA
Ndọnị	Ụkwuanị–Aboh–Ndọnị									Rivers State, Ahoada LGA
Ezza-Ikwo-Izzi-Ngbolizhia cluster	Ezza-Izzi-Ikwo-Ngbolizha								over 4million (SIL)	Ebonyi state , Benue ,Enugu
Ezaa language		Ezaa proper: Izo-imoha-Kpakpaji-Izzikworo ; Ukawu dialects: Amudo, Abba-omegge, Ishinkwo, Amankpuma, Amoffia, Okuzzu	Ezza		ézáá,				1.3million+ 2018 projection	Ebonyi state ,Benue state Ado LGA and Enugu state Nkanu East LGA
Izzi language		Izzi								Ebonyi state and Benue state
Ikwo language		Ikwo								Ebonyi state, Ikwo LGA
Ngbolizhia		Ngbo , Ezzamgbo								Ebonyi state Ohaukwu LGA
