= Njiko Igbo Movement =

The Njiko Igbo Movement is a non-partisan and apolitical initiative spearheaded by Dr. Orji Uzor Kalu to help secure Nigeria's presidential seat for a citizen of Igbo origin. The Igbos, who some pundits believe remain widely resented in Nigeria due to their prominent role in the Nigerian Civil War, have only held the presidency for six months since the country's independence. Despite the seeming political pendulum in Nigeria, according to which the presidency is swapped between the members of different regions on an alternating basis, Dr. Kalu has stated that the Igbos remain a political non-entity and third-class citizens who have not been provided the opportunity to hold the country's leading political office.

The Njiko Igbo Movement has garnered immense support among Igbos and the wider Nigerian community domestically and abroad, and today boasts branches and support groups throughout the diaspora.

Former Nigerian Senator, international lawyer, and human rights activist Emmanuel Onwe is a founding and executive member of the Njiko Igbo Movement.
