= Eze Kenneth Emeka =

Nigerian politician (born 1971)

Senator Eze Kenneth Emeka

Member of the Nigerian National Assembly from Ebonyi State
- Constituency: Ebonyi Central

Personal details
- Born: 22 March 1971 (age 55) Ebonyi State, Nigeria
- Party: All Progressive Congress
- Education
- Occupation: Politician; Engineer

Eze Kenneth Emeka (born 22 March 1971) is a Nigerian engineer and politician from Ebonyi State. He serves as the Senator representing Ebonyi Central District in the 10th National Assembly of Nigeria. He was elected under the platform of the All Progressives Congress during the 2023 Nigerian general election.

== Early life and education ==
Emeka was born on 22 March 1971 in Ebonyi State, Nigeria. He obtained a bachelor's degree in engineering.

== Career ==
Emeka has a background in engineering and politics. He currently serves as the Senator representing Ebonyi Central District in the Nigerian National Assembly. He secured his party's ticket to contest in the 2023 Nigerian general election and was subsequently elected. Emeka is now a member of the 10th Assembly in the Nigerian Senate.
