= Okumkpa =

Okumkpa // is an African dance noted for its humorous qualities, performed in Igbo Afikpo tribes in Nigeria. It is usually performed after the Dry Season Festival. The performers wear masks to transform themselves into mma (spirit).

Each Okumkpa mask has a name, and the dancer wearing the mask is expected to dance according to the quality of the mask. Themes include satirical subjects, such as competing for being the most foolish man on earth to win the "Pot of Foolishness".
