= Ukwuani-Aboh-Ndoni language =

Igboid language cluster of Nigeria

Ukwuani
- Aboh
- Ndoni
- Native to: Nigeria
- Region: Delta and Rivers States
- Ethnicity: Ukwuani
- Native speakers: (550,000 cited 1973)
- Language family: Niger–Congo?: Atlantic–Congo; Volta-Congo; Volta–Niger; yeai; Igboid; Nuclear Ndokwa; Ukwuani
- Dialects: Ukwuani; Aboh; Ndoni

Language codes
- ISO 639-3: ukw
- Glottolog: ukwu1241

Ukwuani, Aboh, and Ndoni are a cluster of Igboid languages of Nigeria.

== Writing system ==
Eboh, Ukwuani Alphabet
a	b	ch	d	e	ẹ	f	g	gb	gh	gw	h	i	ị	j	k	kp	kw	l	lh
m	n	ñ	nw	ny	o	ọ	p	r	s	sh	t	u	ụ	v	w	y	z	zh	
