= Akanu Ibiam Federal Polytechnic =

Polytechnic in Unwana, Ebonyi State, Nigeria

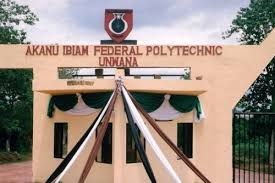
- Type: Public polytechnic
- Established: 1981; 45 years ago
- Rector: Felix Uroko Attah
- Location: Unwana, Ebonyi State, Nigeria; 5°48′11″N 7°55′10″E
- Language: English
- Website: https://polyunwana.edu.ng/

Akanu Ibiam Federal Polytechnic, Unwana, is located in Unwana city, Ebonyi State, Nigeria. The polytechnic was founded in 1981 and is owned by the federal government. It is named after Akanu Ibiam, the First Republic Governor of Eastern Region, Nigeria. The school was initially located on the present site of Federal Government College Okposi, and moved to its site in Unwana in 1987. There are five schools that offer programs leading to National Diploma (ND) and Higher National Diploma (HND) in sciences, engineering, and humanities.

In October 2003 the polytechnic was designated a center for excellence in the southeast by the Nigeria Board for Polytechnic Education due to its excellent administration and the quality of its courses. On 16 September 2008 the school had to be temporarily closed after a violent protest that caused considerable property damage triggered by the murder of an elderly woman at the school. In October 2008 the Polytechnic was selected for establishment of a world class Information and Communication Technology center by the United Nations Education, Scientific and Cultural Organization (UNESCO). In November 2009 a new library was being constructed.

== Library ==
The Polytechnic's library, was opened at the same time the institution was established. It has been instrumental in helping the institution realize its goals and objectives. The library's collection comprise two hundred and fifty serial items in addition to fifteen thousand books covering a variety of subjects. It is not yet computerized at the library. It is not linked to the Internet as a result. Nonetheless, the organization maintains an Internet-driven information and communication center staffed by four non-professionals and six information technology (IT) specialists.

=== Services Rendered by the Library ===
The library supports the institution's research, teaching, and learning activities. Apart from creating an environment that facilitates reading and consulting pertinent information, the Library also provides a range of facilities and services to help users utilize its resources to the fullest. The services include:

- inter-library loan services
- photocopying services
- Reference services
- library publications
- exhibitions and displays
- readers' advisory services
- instruction in the use of library materials

== Faculties and Departments ==
=== School of Business Studies ===
The School of Business Studies contains the following departments; Accountancy, Business administration and management, Library & Information Science, Marketing, Mass Communication and Public Administration

=== School of General & Basic Studies ===
Departments here include; Continuing education, Dean's office (gen and basic studies), Director (continuing education)

General studies, Languages, Legal studies, Mass communication, Remedial studies, Remedial studies (business), Social science and Staff schools

=== School of Industrial Technology ===
Agricultural technology, Animal production technology, Ceramics technology, Dean's office (industrial), Food technology, Horticulture and landscaping, Hospitality management and tourism

=== School of Engineering Technology ===
Building technology, Civil engineering technology., Computer engineering technology, Dean's office (engineering), Elect/elect engineering technology, Mechanical engineering technology, Mechatronics engineering technology, Metallurgical engineering technology, Registry

=== School of Environmental Design and Valuations ===
Dean's office (environmental), Administration, Architectural tech, Building technology, Ceramics tech, Estate management and valuation, Surveying and Geoinformatics tech, Horticulture and landscaping, Quantity surveying, Urban and regional planning and Estate Management and Valuation.

=== School of Science ===
Departments in the school of Science include; Computer Science, Mathematics and Statistics, Science Laboratory Technology and Pharmacology/Pharmaceutical Technology.

== Awards and recognition ==
In February 2025, Akanu Ibiam Federal Polytechnic Unwana gained national acclaim after coming third place at the National Tech Exhibition for Nigerian Polytechnics and other technical institutions for their innovative Online Staff Appraisal (OSTAPP) project. The OSTAPP Team was represented by Mr. Okwara Kalu Kalu, Mr. Gift Adene and an ND II student, Miss Ekpo Virtue Iniobong. Their outstanding performance and technological ingenuity earned them significant recognition, further solidifying the institution's reputation as a leader in technological education and innovation.

== See also ==
- List of polytechnics in Nigeria
- List of federal polytechnics in South East Nigeria
