= Emmanuel Onwe =

Nigerian politician, lawyer, human rights activist and newspaper columnist

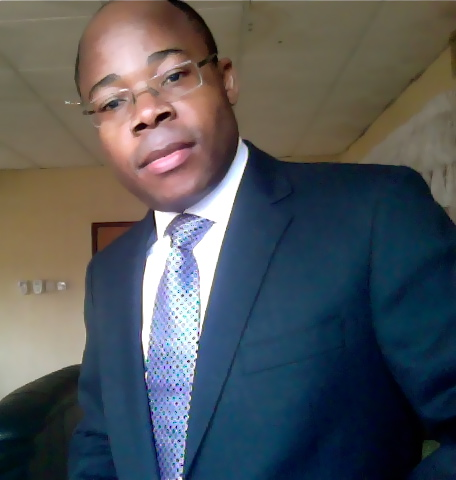
- Emmanuel Onwe in 2013

Commissioner for Information, Ebonyi State

Senator for Ebonyi Central
- In office 10 August 2010 – January 2011

Personal details
- Party: People's Democratic Party; All Progressives Grand Alliance
- Occupation: Lawyer, politician, human rights activist, newspaper columnist

Emmanuel Onwe is a lawyer, human rights activist, newspaper columnist, and former member of the Nigerian Senate. He is presently the Commissioner for Information in Nigeria's Ebonyi State. He is also a founding and executive member of the Njiko Igbo Movement.

Onwe supports the need for transparency and non-politically driven anti-corruption reforms in Nigeria. He has stated that internal squabbles continue to paralyse the government and "if gone unchecked, could result in national paralysis and the tragic death of hope itself."

== Background and education ==
Onwe is from ikwo Local Government Area of Ebonyi State in south east geographical location of Nigeria. He received his early education at Our Lady of Fatima (later renamed the Community Primary School) in Ikwo and the Presbyterian Secondary School, Abakaliki in Anambra State.

Onwe studied law on a scholarship at the London School of Economics and Political Science (LSE), where he earned his bachelor's degree. After his graduation, he entered University College London, where he embarked on postgraduate studies in law.

Onwe trained as a barrister at the Inns of Court School of Law in London. He was admitted to the Honourable Society of Lincoln's Inn in 1999 and called to the English Bar. While at the Inns of Court School of Law, Onwe received the Sir Thomas More Award. He later undertook his pupillage at Two Garden Court Chambers, Middle Temple, London.

== Non-governmental organization background ==
Onwe has worked for the non-governmental organisations, Y-Care International, Friends of the Earth and Amnesty International. At Y-Care International, he worked chiefly on mobilising and delivering relief materials for the victims of the Rwanda Genocide in 1995. At Amnesty International, he worked in the campaigns department and took a special interest in the organisation's campaigns on issues such as the death penalty and in the 1991–1992 campaign against the Maoist guerrilla insurgent organisation Sendero Luminoso (Shining Path) in Peru. During this period, Onwe attended the historic World Conference on Human Rights in Vienna, Austria in June 1993. The conference gave rise to the Vienna Declaration and Programme of Action on Human Rights. As a prelude to the conference, Onwe wrote an essay published in the New Internationalist in June 1993, which extolled the principle of universality and indivisibility over the concept of the cultural relativity and peculiarity of human rights.

Onwe was a founding member of the Civil Liberties Organization's United Kingdom Section alongside Dr. Amazu Anthony Asouzu. After joining the British Labour Party in 1992, he worked on the election campaigns of MPs Bernie Grant and Paul Boateng between 1992 and 2005. Both Grant and Baoteng were long-serving members in the British Parliament.

== Political career ==
Onwe returned to Nigeria after a successful legal practice in the United Kingdom to run for a seat in the Senate to represent Ebonyi Central in the 2007 general elections on the platform of the People's Democratic Party (PDP). Although Onwe won the election, he would later spend nearly 3.5 years in court litigation before successfully retrieving his mandate to serve.

On 16 July 2010, the Court of Appeals in Enugu upheld his appeal and declared that he was the duly elected candidate to represent Ebonyi Central, ordering the Independent Electoral Commission to issue him a Certificate of Return, but a two-week battle ensued before the commission complied with the ruling. After three failed attempts, Senate President David Mark finally allowed Onwe to take his oath of office as a senator on 10 August 2010. However, in January 2011, the Nigerian Supreme Court overturned Onwe's victory in the appeals court.

Onwe stated at the time that the ruling violated the Constitution of Nigeria, which precluded the Supreme Court's jurisdiction in respect to election petition matters, declaring: “There is a burning perversity at the heart of the Supreme Court's ruling. The court’s assumption of jurisdiction over the matter is not supported by a single precedent in the annals of our laws."

In the first few weeks as a senator, Onwe co-sponsored several motions, including a motion exhorting President Goodluck Jonathan to concentrate more on intelligence gathering as a central tool in combating terrorism following the bomb blast in Abuja on the occasion of the celebrations marking the fiftieth anniversary of Nigeria's independence on 1 October 2010.

Onwe remained in the PDP and ran in the primary election for a Senate seat in Ebonyi Central in January 2011. Election violations were reported widely in the media, prompting Onwe to boycott the results, stating that the process was “a complete disgrace to democracy," and declaring that he was ashamed to belong to "such a country that calls itself a democracy."

Onwe ran again for the Senate seat in 2011 on the platform of the All Progressives Grand Alliance. Halfway through the National Assembly elections on 2 April 2011, the Independent Electoral Commission called off the elections, citing the inadequacy of election materials. The exit poll results showed that Onwe led at the time when the balloting was stopped. Onwe opted against participating in the rescheduled election a week later, and called for the results to be annulled. Following the election, he led a protest march against the police, accusing them of facilitating the electoral fraud that allegedly marred the election. The police responded by firing bullets and teargas at the crowd, injuring several protesters.

Onwe’s campaign came under intimidation and violence, leading to the vandalisation of his campaign offices, the destruction of his campaign vehicles, the kidnapping of his campaign aides, and a physical attack on others who variously received knife and gunshot wounds. On 29 October 2010, Onwe claimed that his life was under threat solely as a result of his political aspirations.

== Writings ==
Onwe is also the author of the book Serpents and Doves, which was published in 2009, and a columnist with the New Telegraph newspaper.
