= New Telegraph =

Newspaper in Nigeria

- Type: Daily newspaper
- Format: Broadsheet
- Publisher: Dr. Uzor Kalu
- Editor-in-chief: Mr. Ayodele Aminu
- Editor: Juliet Bumah
- Founded: October 2013
- Language: English
- Headquarters: Lagos, Nigeria
- Website: http://newtelegraphng.com

The New Telegraph is an all-national newspaper in Nigeria, with a circulation of up to 100,000 copies per day.

The New Telegraph targets Nigerian and foreign readers in and around the country's urban centers, as well as internationally, and aims to provide objective and incisive coverage of pressing political and socio-cultural issues.

The New Telegraph is chaired by Orji Uzor Kalu and features prominent domestic and foreign columnists, including human rights lawyer Emmanuel Onwe.

== See also ==
- List of newspapers in Nigeria
