= Odozi Obodo (cult) =

Odozi Obodo Society was a secret cult that operated between 1954 and 1958 in Abakaliki area of Eastern Nigeria. A ruthless cult, it was led by a high priest, Nwiboko Obodo who was also known as "afunanya ekwe".

== History ==
Nwiboko Obodo hailed from Isieke, a village a few kilomeres from Abakaliki. He had lived in different communities before returning to Isieke in 1953. In the village, he formed a group to curb criminal activities within the community. However, the group's activities soon turned oppressive and deadly, as villagers began to believe the group was involved in the murder of community members. During this period, the incomes of the cult members showed improvement and they began to flaunt their wealth, attracting more members. The high priest, Obodo, would pay the taxes of adult residents in the village and then turn around and bill them fines; if the resident could not pay, their farm or property would be seized.

Criminal investigation into the activities of the cult arose after the disappearance of Obodo's wife. After she was not seen publicly for a few months, her brother reported a missing persons case at the local police station. A subsequent undercover operation gathered incriminating evidence on the activities of the cult. Obodo's house was searched and further evidence implicating him and six others in the murder of his wife was found. The investigation revealed that the cult was involved in various murders in the Eastern region, mostly of persons alleged to be involved in criminal activities or social vices and who were unable to pay the fines imposed by the society. The trial of members of the cult led to the sentencing of 59 persons to death.
