= Federal Polytechnic, Oko =

Polytechnic in Oko, Anambra State, Nigeria

Federal Polytechnic, Oko, Anambra State
- Type: Public Institution
- Established: 1979; 47 years ago
- Rector: Eugene C. Ubaka.
- Location: Oko, Anambra State, Nigeria
- Campus: Rural campuses
- Website: federalpolyoko.edu.ng

Federal Polytechnic, Oko is a Nigerian polytechnic located in Oko, Orumba North Local Government Area, Anambra State. Established in 1979, it was previously named the College of Arts, Science and Technology.

Federal Polytechnic, Oko has established memoranda of understanding with several universities in Nigeria and abroad.

On July 31, 2024, Eugene C. Ubaka was announced the Acting Rector by the Chairman of Federal Polytechnic Oko Governing Council, Sen. Engr. Barnabas Gemade.

== Faculties/Schools ==
Presently, there are 8 academic faculties/schools in the polytechnic.

=== School of Engineering Technology ===
- Civil Engineering
- Mechanical Engineering
- Electrical Electronics Engineering
- Agricultural Engineering
- Computer Engineering
- Agricultural Technology
- Chemical Engineering

=== School of Environmental Design and Technology ===
- Architecture
- Building Technology
- Estate Management
- Urban and Regional Planning
- Quantity Surveying
- Surveying and Geo-informatics

=== School of Applied Science and Technology ===
- Science Laboratory Technology
- Home and Rural Economics
- Food Technology
- Mathematics and Statistics
- Hospitality Management and Tourism
- Computer Science
- Agricultural Technology
- Horticultural Technology

=== School of Information Technology ===
- Mass Communication
- Library and Information Science

=== School of Arts, Design and Printing Technology ===
- Fashion Design & Clothing Technology
- Printing Technology
- Fine and Applied Arts

=== School of Business Studies ===
- Business Administration & Management
- Public Administration
- Office Technology and Management
- Marketing

=== School of Financial Studies ===
- Accountancy
- Banking and Finance
- Insurance

=== School of General Studies ===
- Natural Science
- Social Science
- Languages

== Campus ==
The Polytechnic has three campuses located across Nigeria.

- The main campus is at Oko which occupies a total land area of 89 hectares or approximately acres.
- Ufuma campus occupies a total land area of 52 hectares or approximately 129 acres.
- Atani campus has a total area of 40 hectares.

== See also ==
- List of federal polytechnics in South East Nigeria
- List of Polytechnics in Nigeria
