= Ezaa language =

Igboid language spoken in Ebonyi State, Nigeria

Ezaa
- Ezza
- Region: Ebonyi State, Nigeria
- Ethnicity: Ezaa people
- Native speakers: 1,590,000 (2020 projection)
- Language family: Niger–Congo?: Atlantic–Congo; Volta-Congo; Volta–Niger; yeai; Igboid; Nuclear Igboid; Izi–Ezaa–Ikwo–Mgbo; Ezaa
- Writing system: Latin

Language codes
- ISO 639-3: eza
- Glottolog: ezaa1238

Ezaa// (Ezza, Eza) is an Igboid language spoken in Ebonyi state in Nigeria. It forms a dialect cluster with closely related Izii, Ikwo, and Mgbo, though they are only marginally mutually intelligible. The Ezaa language consists of 2 tonal patterns of speakers the broader Ezza language and the ukawu tone (southern Ezza communities) only a different of word patterns in pronunciation and intonation. The phonetic alphabet of the Ezza language has 40 letters due to huge tonal features present in it compared to standardized Igbo with 36.
