= General Council of the Assemblies of God Nigeria =

- Classification: Evangelical Christianity
- Theology: Pentecostal
- Associations: Assemblies of God
- Headquarters: Enugu, Nigeria
- Origin: 1934
- Congregations: 16,300
- Members: 3.6 million

The General Council of the Assemblies of God, Nigeria is a Pentecostal Christian denomination in Nigeria affiliated with the World Assemblies of God Fellowship, with headquarters in Enugu, Enugu State. Abel Amadi is the General Superintendent of Assemblies of God, Nigeria.

== History ==
The General Council of the Assemblies of God Nigeria has its origins in the Nigerian Church of Jesus Christ and a partnership with the Assemblies of God USA in 1917. The council was founded in 1934. The current General Superintendent of Assemblies of God, Nigeria is Abel Amadi.
