= Christian Ebisike =

Anglican bishop in Nigeria (died 2018)

Christian Ebisike (died 2018) was a Nigerian Anglican bishop. He was the Bishop Emeritus of Ngbo.

He was kidnapped in 2010 after being bishop for one day.

He died in 2018.
