= Unwana =

Unwana Ali Unwara light of the state Unwara
- City
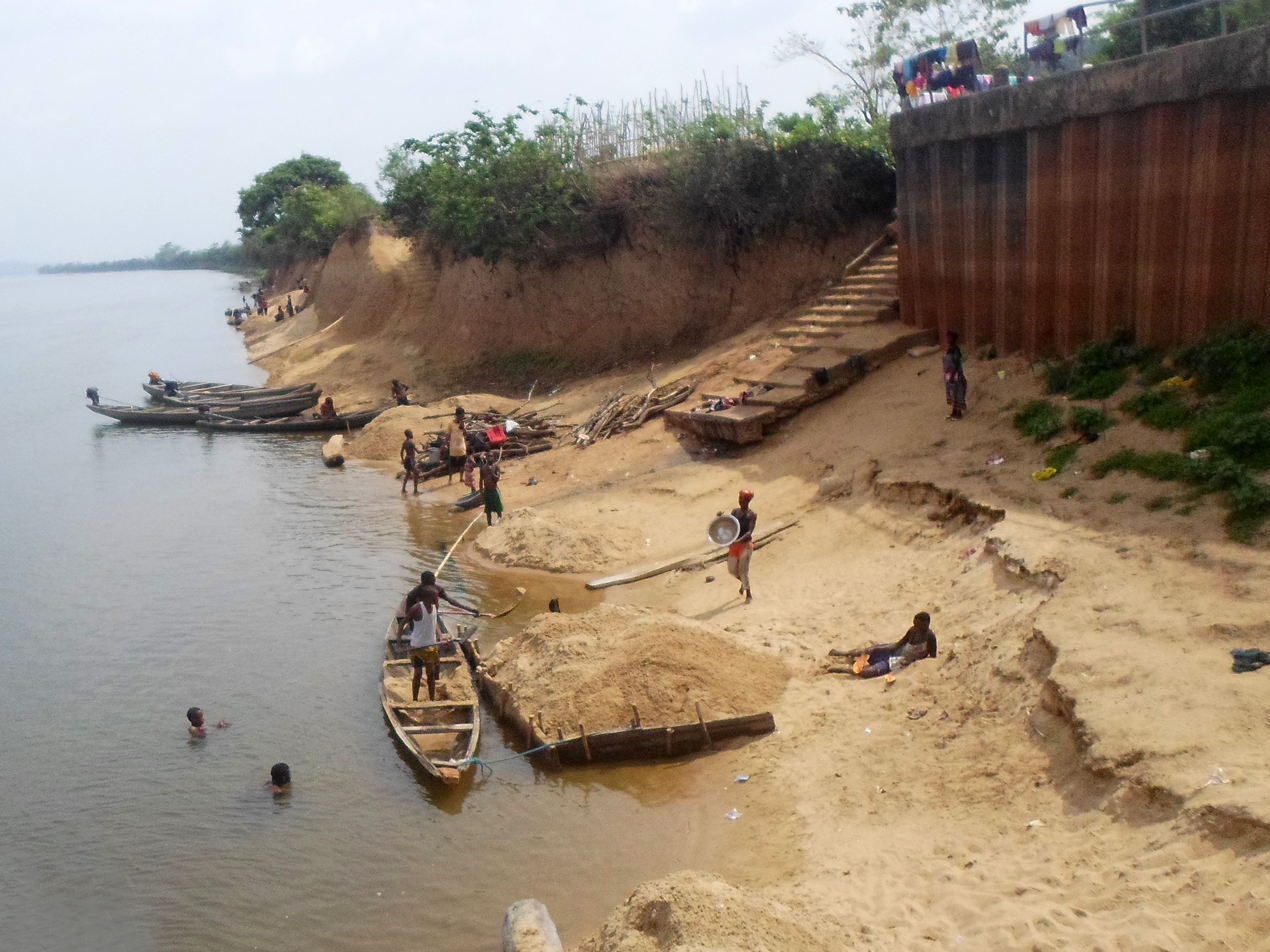

- Location in Nigeria
- Coordinates: 5°51′45″N 7°56′55″E
- Country: Nigeria
- State: Ebonyi State
- LGA: Afikpo North

Area
  - Total: 190 km^{2} (73 sq mi)
- Elevation: 62 m (203 ft)

Population (2006)
  - Total: 120,000
  - Density: 630/km^{2} (1,600/sq mi)
- Time zone: UTC+1 (West Africa Time)

Unwana also known as Unwara, is a town and the third-most important urban area in Ebonyi State, Nigeria. It is situated in the southern part of Ebonyi State. It is bordered in the north by Afikpo, in the west by Edda, and in the east by Cross River State. It is the seat of Akanu Ibiam Federal Polytechnic Unwana.

== History and geographical study ==
Unwana is situated upon a hill and is the hometown of Ezeogo Dr Akanu Ibiam, the first governor of eastern Nigeria.

Unwana city is located in eastern Nigeria at Ebonyi state. It is located at latitude 5.7833' and longitude 7.9333'. Altitude 354 feet (107 m), lat (DMS) 5'46', long (DMS) 7'55'60E.

Unwana city is bounded on the west by cross-river state river, in the west by Afikpo.

=== Size ===
Unwana city has a total land area of approximately 190 km^{2}, but actually occupies 110% of the total land area.

=== People and population ===
The Igbo remains the largest tribe in Unwana city. As the place where Akanu Ibiam Federal Polytechnic is located and the capital of Ubeyi Development center. It also inhabits some of the tribes in the country. Although Unwana city is among the largest towns in Ebonyi state, as of 1991, the total population of Unwana was estimated at 120,000 people.

=== Geography ===
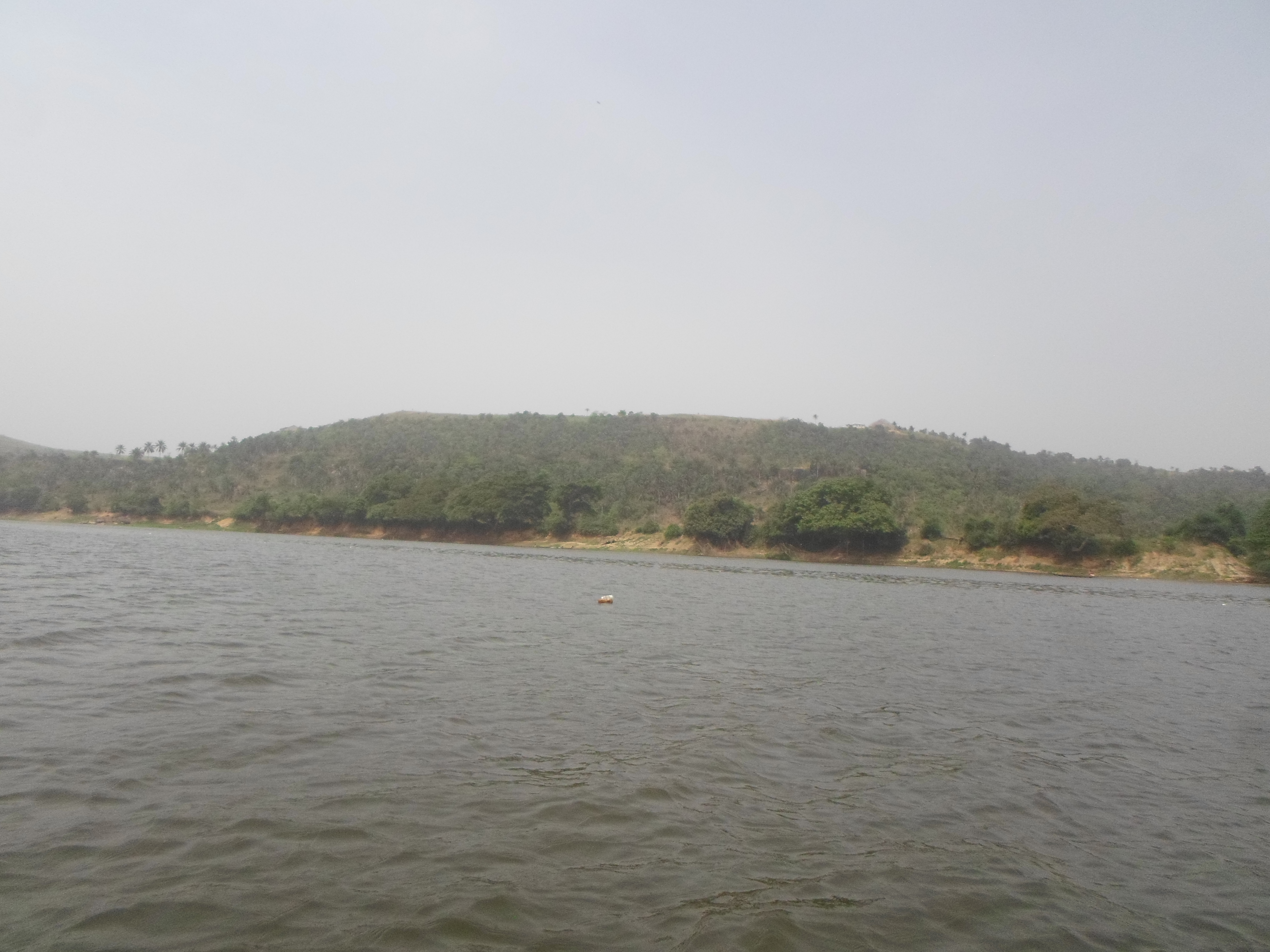
Unwana Beach.

Unwana city is a highland area of 200 m (660 ft) above sea-level. The town can be divided into two sub-regions: the narrow lowland area with the Itara river and Ubeny river, and the low-narrow sandy beach.

Unwana City is purely a riverine town. It has beaches like Unwana beach and Ozara Lake.

=== Economy ===
Inhabitants of Unwana City are involved in a large number of economic activities which include: small-scale industries, fishing, Farming, administration, commercial, transportation, trading and education.

== Climate ==
Unwana City is located in the equatorial climate belt of Nigeria. Rainfall is high with a maximum during June/July and September/October with a short August break. Humidity, due to its nearness to the river is moderate.

Unwana City has one vegetation belt which is the freshwater swamp.

Köppen-Geiger climate classification system classifies its climate as tropical wet and dry (Aw).

Climate data for Unwana
Month	Jan	Feb	Mar	Apr	May	Jun	Jul	Aug	Sep	Oct	Nov	Dec	Year
Mean daily maximum °C (°F)	32.6 (90.7)	33.8 (92.8)	33.8 (92.8)	33.4 (92.1)	32 (90)	30.8 (87.4)	29.3 (84.7)	28.6 (83.5)	29.9 (85.8)	30.8 (87.4)	32.1 (89.8)	32.6 (90.7)	31.6 (89.0)
Daily mean °C (°F)	27.5 (81.5)	28.5 (83.3)	29 (84)	28.7 (83.7)	27.6 (81.7)	26.7 (80.1)	25.4 (77.7)	25.6 (78.1)	26 (79)	26.6 (79.9)	27.4 (81.3)	26.4 (79.5)	27.1 (80.8)
Mean daily minimum °C (°F)	22.5 (72.5)	23.2 (73.8)	24.2 (75.6)	24 (75)	23.3 (73.9)	22.6 (72.7)	22.9 (73.2)	22.7 (72.9)	22.2 (72.0)	22.4 (72.3)	22.8 (73.0)	22.8 (73.0)	23.0 (73.3)
Average precipitation mm (inches)	19 (0.7)	34 (1.3)	84 (3.3)	159 (6.3)	247 (9.7)	261 (10.3)	303 (11.9)	270 (10.6)	309 (12.2)	269 (10.6)	57 (2.2)	15 (0.6)	2,027 (79.7)
Source: Climate-Data.org (altitude: 62 m [203 ft])
