= Enyi =

Enyi is a name. Notable people with the name include:

- Enyi Okoronkwo, British actor
- Chiamaka Enyi-Amadi, Nigerian-Irish poet
