= Ezaa people =

Ethnic subgroup in Nigeria

Ezza (Ezaa)
Total population
- ~about 1,300,000 (2018 projection)

Regions with significant populations
- Nigeria about 1,300,000 (2018 projection)

Languages
- Igbo language

Ezaa or Ezza is a northeastern Igbo group, in Ebonyi State, southeastern Nigeria. The Ezaa are direct descendants of Anakiwha predecessors . the share same progenitors with other Umuekumenyi which comprises Nnoyo, Nnodo and Ezekuna respectively. Ezekuna is the father of the Ezza culture . The Ezzas refers themselves as Ezaa Ezekuna . “. The group is found in Ebonyi Central and also have many significant populations in the North and south LGA's across the Ebonyi state

== Origin of Ezza people ==
Ezza people traces origin to a group of Neolithic autochthonous Igbo group who lived around the Northestearn Igboland called the Anakiwha . The Formation of modern Ezza culture revolves around a figure called Enyi. based on the migratory story, the partriarch called EKuma Enyi is said have to flee his Egu settlement and move northward after a conquest (possibly Ugwuegu story of afikpo ) and sought refuge among his ancestral kin the Anakiwha in Onueke area. Enyi as adopted to Anakiwha leke rose to be among the council of Anakiwha Ezeke (Anakiwha leke) the last ancient custodian of the Anakiwha council who died of an mythical ailments. Enyi married amongst the family of Anakiwha Ezeke begot two sons Nnoyo and Nnodo who later founded the Izzi and Ikwo . Ezekuna (Ezeke Una) is the direct linage of Anakiwha leke and was a stepbrother to Ekumaenyi . Ezekuna married Anyigor, sister to Nnoyo and Nnodo the sons of Enyi nwegu which automatically made him brother in-law and step uncle them .

== Geography ==
Ezza people lives homogeneously in 22 autonomous communities and shares several communities with other groups Ezza community are classified into groups below.

1. Izo-imoha group : This communities lives in northern Ezza heartland especially in Ezza north LGA; Umuezeoka, Umuezekeoha, Umuoghara, Oriuzo and Ekka with integration of Ogboji , umuhuali and Amaewula.

2.Izzikworo group : This communities are in Ezza southeast development axis ; Amegu Headquarters, Amana, Amaezekwe, Idembia , Echara, Okoffia,

3.Kpakpaji group: This communities host the urban of Onueke and it's the centre of Ezza administration; Amekka, Amuzu, Ezzama.

4. Ukawu group : this are isolated communities in southernmost part of Ezza formed out of prior sojourning of other groups from the heartland due dispersal and as refuge of war and exile's; Abba-omegge, Okuzzu, Ishinkwo, Amankpuma,

5. The Proto-Ezza unclassified communities are Nsokkara and Amudo

6. Satellites communities gotten out of war and mercenarial service includes; Izzo, Ezzagu , Ezza akpoga, Izzo , Ezza Benue (ojiegbe ,Otsukputu, Ulayi), Ezza-Ezzilo , and many other settlements

== Notable people ==
- Offia Nwali
- Paulinus Igwe Nwagu
- Eze Kenneth Emeka
- Lazarus Ogbee
- Benard Odoh
- Julius Ucha
