= Ebonyi State University =

University in Abakaliki, Nigeria

Ebonyi State University, Abakaliki
- Other name: EBSU
- Established: 1999
- Chairman: Frank Nchita Ogbuewu
- Vice-Chancellor: Prof. Michael Ugota Awoke
- Location: Abakaliki, Ebonyi, Nigeria
- Campus: CAS, Presco, Ishieke, Perm Site
- Website: www.ebsu.edu.ng

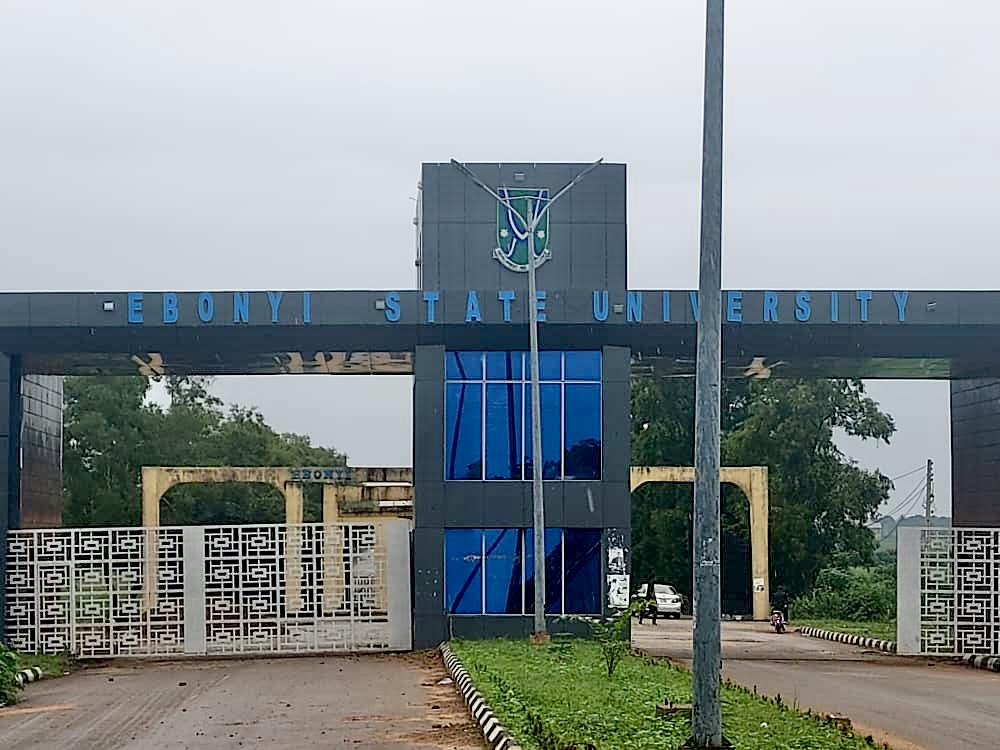
Ebonyi State University Abakaliki Front gate

Ebonyi State University, Abakaliki (EBSU) was founded in 1999 in Abakaliki, Ebonyi State Nigeria. The university's medical faculty was established in 1991 as ESUT's Faculty of Health Sciences. Many of its facilities were developed in response to a Guinea worm pandemic; the Abakaliki Specialist Hospital, created for this purpose, was remodelled to become Ebonyi State University's primary teaching hospital. It was subsequently granted accreditation by the Medical and Dental Council of Nigeria (MDCN) for the training of medical students and resident doctors. Since it became part of Ebonyi State University, the medical school has received considerable funding from the Ebonyi government.

== Background ==
EBSU was founded in 1999 in Abakaliki, Nigeria. Its medical faculty, established in 1991, was initially part of ESUT's Faculty of Health Sciences. After becoming part of EBSU, the medical school received significant funding from the Ebonyi government and operates with accreditation from the Medical and Dental Council of Nigeria. It is also sectioned into four (4) major campuses, all situated in Abakaliki. They are as follows:

- The permanent site Campus is the main location of the institution established in 1999 by the then government of Ebonyi state, Samueul O. Egwu. It is located between Ezzamgbo and Ishieke The campus has part of the administrative block and offices. The campus also consists of the Faculty of Management Sciences; Faculty of Social Science; Faculty of Arts and Humanities and Faculty of Natural Science.
- Presco Campus is located at Presco junction in Abakaliki. Presco Campus has the Faculties of Health science and the Faculty of Basic Medical Science.
- Ishieke Campus is located at Ishieke community in Ebonyi state. It has the Faculty of Education.
- Cas Campus located at a waterworks in Abakaliki. It has the Faculty of Law and the Faculty of Agricultural sciences.

== Faculties and departments ==
=== Social Science and Humanities ===
1. Department of English and Literary Studies
2. Department of Linguistics and French
3. Department of History and International Relations
4. Department of Philosophy
5. Department of Mass Communication
6. Department of Political Science
7. Department of Sociology and Anthropology
8. Department of Psychology
9. Department of Economics

=== Basic Medical Sciences ===
1. Department of Anatomy
2. Department of physiology
3. Department of medicine and surgery
4. Department of physiotherapy

=== Faculty of Sciences ===
1. Department of Applied Biology
2. Department of Applied Microbiology
3. Department of Biochemistry
4. Department of Biotechnology
5. Department of Computer Science
6. Department of Geology/Exploration
7. Department of Industrial Chemistry
8. Department of Industrial Mathematics and Statistics
9. Department of Industrial Physics

=== Clinical Medicine ===
Clinical training and research opportunities for medical students, resident doctors, and other healthcare professionals is provided through the Ebonyi State University Teaching Hospital.

=== Ebonyi State University Teaching Hospital ===
Ebonyi State University Teaching Hospital (EBSUTH)

Geography
- Location: Ebonyi state, Nigeria
- Coordinates: 6.331823857256235°N 8.092351141411637°E

Organisation
- Type: Teaching hospital

Links
- Lists: Hospitals in Nigeria

Ebonyi State University Teaching Hospital (EBSUTH) is a public teaching hospital located in Abakaliki, Ebonyi State, Nigeria. It serves as the primary medical training facility for students of Ebonyi State University College of Medicine and provides healthcare services to the residents of the state and surrounding regions. The hospital was established to support medical education and improve healthcare delivery in Ebonyi State. Over the years, it has expanded its services to include specialized medical care, research, and training programs for healthcare professionals.

=== Health Science & Technology ===
1. Department of medical laboratory science
2. Department of nursing

=== Law ===
Department of Law

=== Engineering and Environmental Science ===
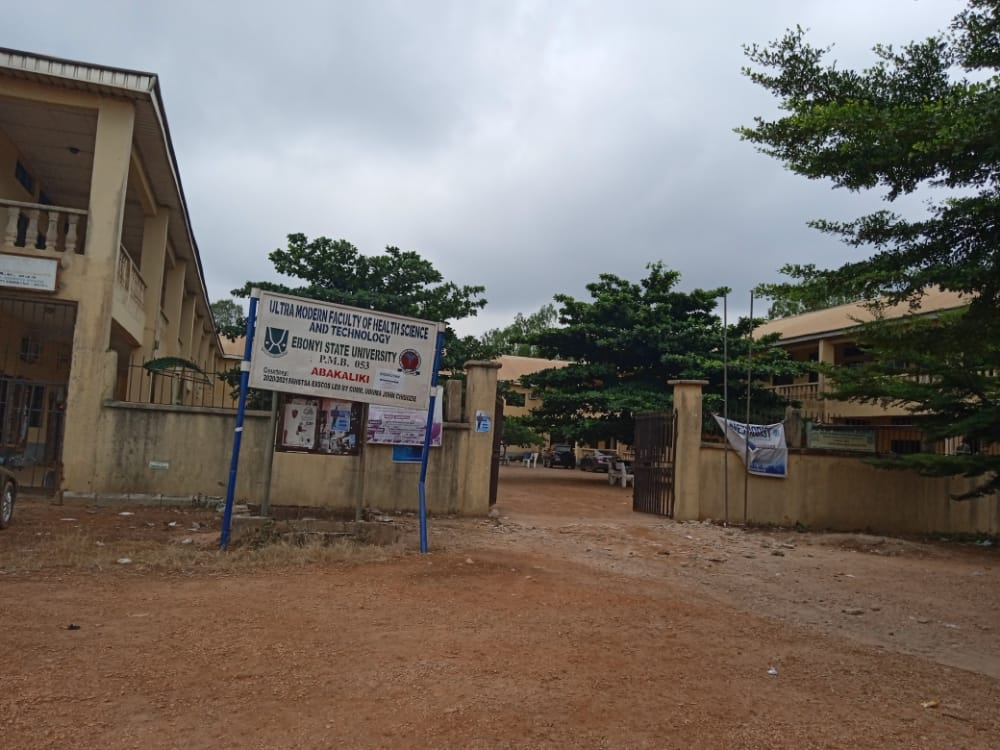
Faculty of Health Science and Technology, Ebonyi State University Abakaliki

School of Post Graduate studies

== Notable alumni ==
- Charity Eke, Nigerian actress
