= Anglican Diocese of Ngbo =

Anglican diocese in Nigeria

Coordinates: 6°21′N 8°07′E

The Anglican Diocese of Ngbo is one of 12 dioceses within the Anglican Province of Enugu, itself one of 14 ecclesiastical provinces within the Church of Nigeria. The bishop emeritus is Christian Ebisike and the current bishop is the Right Rev. Godwin Awoke.
