= Ikwo people =

Ethnic subgroup in Nigeria

Ikwo
Total population
- 600,000

Regions with significant populations
- Nigeria 600,000

Languages
- Ikwo language

The Ikwo is a group of the Igbo people who live in southeastern Nigeria. The area is rich in mineral resources, and the ancestors of today's inhabitants developed bronze-casting techniques over a thousand years ago, some found in the town of Igbo Ukwu. The creativity and technical skill demonstrated by those early Igbo bronze, metal and terra cotta crafters is recognized as among the finest in the history of the world. They number around 600,000.

Ikwo language is spoken in Ebonyi state.

== Notable Indigenes ==
- Chief Martin Elechi, former Governor of Ebonyi State.
- Eric Kelechi Igwe, Deputy Governor of Ebonyi State.
- Frank Ogbuewu, Nigeria's former Ambassador and former Minister of Culture and tourism.
- Senator Emmanuel Onwe, former Senator of the Federal Republic of Nigeria.

== See also ==
- Igbo people
- Ikwo (local government area)
