= Ikwo language =

Igboid language spoken in Ebonyi state, Nigeria

Ikwo
- Native to: Nigeria
- Region: Ebonyi State, Cross River State
- Ethnicity: Ikwo people
- Native speakers: 260,000 (2012)
- Language family: Niger–Congo?: Atlantic–Congo; Volta-Congo; Volta–Niger; yeai; Igboid; Nuclear Igboid; Izi–Ezaa–Ikwo–Mgbo; Ikwo
- Writing system: Latin

Language codes
- ISO 639-3: iqw
- Glottolog: ikwo1238

Ikwo is an Igboid language spoken in Ebonyi state in Nigeria. It forms a dialect cluster with closely related Izii, Ezza, and Mgbo, though they are only marginally mutually intelligible.
