= Alex Ekwueme Federal University Ndufu Alike Ikwo =

Nigerian University in Ebonyi State

Coordinates: 6.13165°N 8.14136°E

- Motto: Excellence and Integrity
- Type: Public
- Established: 2011
- Chancellor: HRM Oba (Dr.) Michael Aremu Adedotun Gbadebo CFR, Alake and Paramount Ruler of Egbaland
- Vice-Chancellor: Professor Elom Sunday Oge
- Students: Over 10000
- Location: Ikwo, Ebonyi, Nigeria
- Colours: Green
- Website: www.funai.edu.ng

The Alex Ekwueme Federal University Ndufu-Alike, Ebonyi State (AE-FUNAI) is a public university located in Ndufu-Alike Ikwo, Ebonyi State, Nigeria. Established by the Federal Government in 2011, it was called the Federal University Ndufu Alike Ikwo until 2 February 2018, when it was renamed after former Vice President of Nigeria, Dr. Alex Ekwueme. The university sits on a land area of 438 hectares, and has 10,000 students and 2,230 staff.

== Faculties and Departments ==
The university has 13 Faculties, 50 departments, 58 academic programmes and a college of Medical Sciences as well as a School of Postgraduate Studies:

- Agriculture
- Basic Medical Sciences
- Education
- Engineering and Technology
- Humanities
- Management Sciences
- Social Sciences
- Biological Sciences
- Environmental Sciences
- College of Medicine
- Physical Sciences
- Law
- Nursing

== The University Library ==
The University Library was founded in 2012, not long after the university was founded in 2011. The university's primary focus area —teaching/learning, research, and community services — are in tandem with the library as a social institution.

The primary aims of the library are to:

- Establish fully ICT-driven library services by adopting the application of information technology to all library operations
- Make sure to build a solid library of resources using reliable information sources.
- Create and maintain a strong electronic library on the Virtual Learning Environment platform (VLE).
- Provide a suitable environment for learning and research purposes.
- Make sure the sources are current, pertinent, and, most essential, have a significant impact on the university's programmes.
- Provide staff and students sufficient access to the collection and ensure that they make the most of the information sources available.
- Manage the resources effectively for the university's benefit.
- offer auxiliary services to the university population.

== The Library Structure ==
The university Librarian oversees the University Library as it currently stands. There are five departments: Readers' Services, Cataloguing and Book Processing, Serials Management, Acquisitions and Gifts, and the Library Systems Development Unit. The departments in charge of acquisitions and serials management are primarily in charge of collection development (books and journals in print format only). The cataloguing department is responsible for cataloging and classifying new materials. The Readers' Services Department manages the programs and activities that library patrons engage in, such as book borrowing, reference services, reserved book services, etc., while the Systems Development Department is in charge of managing the library's automation and computerization systems as well as its electronic resource management.

=== Library Services ===
- Lending books to both staff and students
- E-library services
- Inter-library loan services
- Book Reservation
- Reference services

== See also ==
- Education in Nigeria
- List of universities in Nigeria
