= Ebonyi (local government area) =

Local Government Area in Ebonyi State, Nigeria

- LGA
- Interactive map of Ebonyi
- Coordinates: 6°12′N 8°00′E
- Country: Nigeria
- State: Ebonyi State
- Capital: Nkaliki

Area
  - Total: 446 km^{2} (172 sq mi)

Population (2006)
  - Total: 126,837
  - Density: 284/km^{2} (737/sq mi)
- Time zone: UTC+1 (WAT)
- Postal code: 480

Ebonyi is a Local Government Area in Ebonyi State, Nigeria. Its headquarters are in the town of Nkaliki.

It has an area of 443 km^{2} and a population of 126,837 based on the census conducted in 2006. The postal code of the area is 480.

The current chairman of the local government is Chief (Hon) Nwogba Ebere Stephen.
