= Afikpo North =

Afikpo Afikpo North
- LGA
- Interactive map of Afikpo
- Coordinates: 5°52′N 7°57′E
- Country: Nigeria
- State: Ebonyi State
- Headquarters: Ehugbo
- Major city: Unwana; Amasiri

Government
  - Type: Local Government Area
  - Chairman: Engr. Timothy Nwachi

Area
  - Total: 240 km^{2} (93 sq mi)

Population (2021)
  - Total: 881,611
  - Density: 3,700/km^{2} (9,500/sq mi)
- Time zone: UTC+1 (WAT)

Afikpo is a Local Government Area of Ebonyi State, Nigeria. Its headquarters is in the town of Ehugbo, Afikpo. Important townships include Ehugbo (with Itim Ukwu, Ohaisu, Nkpoghoro, Ugwuegu/Amaizu, Ozizza autonomous communities characteristic of towns too) Unwana and Amasiri. Other notable areas are Ibii and Akpoha. Afikpo North is located in Ebonyi South senatorial district of Ebonyi state Nigeria.

It has an area of 240 km^{2} and a population of 881,611 at the 2021. Its postal code is 490. The major language is a more localised form of the Igbo language known as the 'Ehugbo Language'. It has a rich Igbo traditional heritage and culture and has festivals like the 'New Yam Festival' that hold at the end of the month of August every year, which marks the beginning of a new traditional year.

== Igbo traditional centre ==
Afikpo is a centre of ancient Igbo tradition. Ceremonial (now antique) masks have been carefully preserved by the state tourism board. Several archaeological findings support the claim that Afikpo civilisation existed as far back as the Neolithic age.

There is a rite of passage for every male child from Afikpo. This entails initiation into the Ogo cult. It is shrouded in secrecy and mystery, as women are not let into the workings of the cult. This confers adulthood to the male child.

Afikpo is the only surviving hamlet of the ancient ugwuegu culture 3000 BCE - 5th century CE, Afikpo preserved the ancient hamlet complex culture of the Egu people as a fortress of the refugees from the ugwuegu abandoned valley. It is undoubtedly one of the oldest continuously inhabited settlements and one the still existing pre Nri society in Igbo land.

== Climate ==
In Afikpo, the rainy season is humid, oppressive, and overcast and the dry season is hot, muggy, and partially cloudy. Over the course of the year, the temperature normally fluctuates between 66 °F to 88 °F and is rarely below 60 °F or over 91 °F.

=== Geography and economy ===
Afikpo North Local Government Area (LGA) is 240 km^{2} in size, with an average temperature of 27.5 degrees Celsius or 81.5 degrees Fahrenheit and an estimated humidity of 74%.

Yam, cassava, and rice are among the many crops grown in Afikpo North, which is well known for its substantial agricultural output. Also, business thrives in the Afikpo North local government region with markets such as the Eke and Nkwo markets providing veritable forums for the interchange of a wide range of goods and services.

== Higher institutions in Afikpo North ==
- Mater Misericordia Hospital School of Nursing and Midwifery
- Akanu Ibiam Federal Polytechnic, Unwana
- Government secondary school afikpo

== Notable people ==
- Chris Abani, Nigerian-American author
- Abuja Area Mama, LGBTQ sex worker and activist murdered in 2024
- Uche Azikiwe, premier first Lady of Nigeria, wife of Nnamdi Azikiwe
- Onyebuchi Chukwu, Minister of Health from 2010 until 2014
- Priscilla Ekwere Eleje, first woman to have her signature on the naira note
- Iduma Igariwey Enwo, lawyer and politician former chairman afikpo North local government area, legislative representative for afikpo North and South federal constituency since 2015
- Akanu Ibiam, first governor of Eastern Nigeria, predecessor of Chukwuemeka Ojukwu
- Maria Ude Nwachi, politician and online personality
- Patricia Obila, deputy governor of Ebonyi state
- Michael Nnachi Okoro, clergyman and former bishop of the Roman Catholic Diocese of Abakaliki
- Nnenna Oti, Vice Chancellor Federal University of Technology Owerri
- Francis Otunta, mathematician
