= Abakaliki =

Capital city of Ebonyi State, Nigeria

- City and LGA
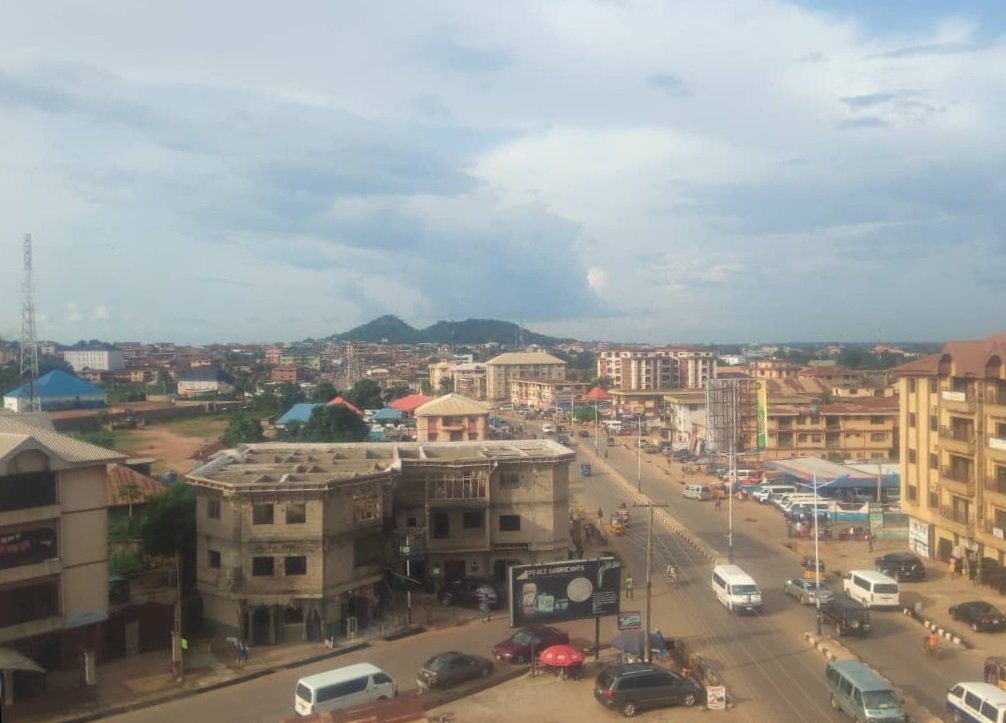
- Abakaliki with Azugwu Hill in the background
- Interactive map of Abakaliki
- Location in Nigeria
- Coordinates: 6°20′N 8°06′E
- Country: Nigeria
- State: Ebonyi State

Population (2022)
  - City and LGA: 223,000
  - Metro: 662,000
- Time zone: UTC+1 (WAT)
- National language: Igbo

Abakaliki is the capital city of Ebonyi State in southeastern Nigeria, located 64 kilometres (40 mi) southeast of Enugu. The inhabitants are primarily members of the Igbo tribe. It was the headquarters of the Ogoja province before the creation of the Southeastern State in 1967.

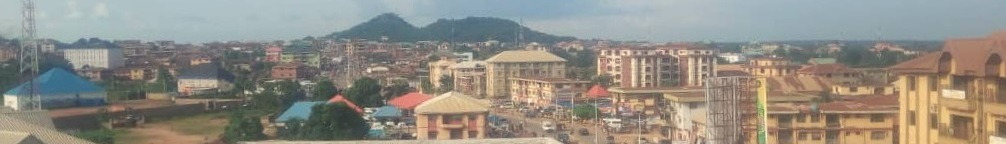
Abakaliki metropolis with Azugwu Hill in the background.

== Etymology ==
The name Abakaliki originally means 'Aba Nkaleke' and is the name of a community in Izzi land (Nkaleke).

== History ==
Abakaliki was an important centre for the slave trade in the 17th century. The slave trade continued in the area with Aro raids into Abakaliki and surrounding areas through the 18th century.

The Odozi Obodo Society was a secret cult that operated between 1954 and 1958 in Abakaliki.

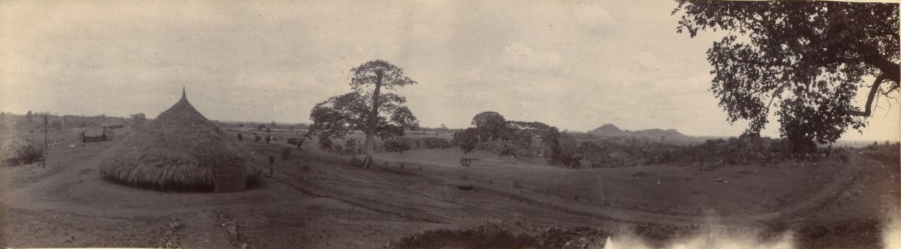
Old Abakaliki, ca.1910

== Economy ==
Abakaliki, as in the past, is a centre of agricultural trade including such products as yams, cassava, rice, and both palm oil and palm kernels. It is also known for its local lead, zinc, salt, and limestone mining or quarrying. They host a golf course and many hotels. There are also isolated poultry and egg production farms across the state.

== Population ==
The last known population of Abakaliki was 223,000 (year 2022). The population of the metro area was estimated to be 662,000 (year 2023).

=== Demographics ===
Abakaliki is generally populated by the Igbo people. Abakaliki is predominantly populated by the Northeastern Igbo of the Afikpo-Abakaliki axis. Abakaliki is also used to refer to people of old Abakaliki political block comprising Ohaukwu-Ishielu-Izzi-Ezza-Ikwo.

== Climate ==
The dry season in Abakaliki is hot, muggy, and partially cloudy while the wet season is warm, welcoming, but overcast. The temperature rarely falls below 14 °C (58 °F) or rises over 33 °C (92 °F) throughout the year, often fluctuating between 18 °C (65 °F) and 32 °C (89 °F).

== Infrastructure ==
Abakaliki lies at the intersection of the Enugu, Afikpo and Ogoja Roads. Abakaliki also hosts a Federal hospital, which has largely contributed to the affordability of public healthcare delivery in the city and the state. There have been massive infrastructural developments ongoing in the urban centre in recent years; these include road construction, shopping malls and market places, trans-African Highway fly-over bridges at Presco and Spera-in-Deo junctions, amongst others.

=== Education ===
Ebonyi State University main campus is located on the outskirts of the city.

== Religion ==
Abakaliki people like other southeastern Nigerians are predominantly Christian. Other religious faiths like Traditionalist, Islam, etc. are practiced by handfuls of natives as well as non-natives from other parts of the country. Roman Catholic, Presbyterian, Anglican and Pentecostal missions are the dominant Christian faiths. On March 1, 1973, the city was made the seat of the Roman Catholic Diocese of Abakaliki.
