= Ebonyi State =

State of Nigeria

Ebonyi
- State
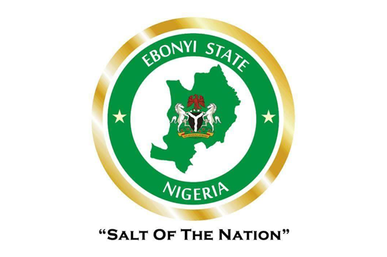
- Flag Seal
- Nicknames: Salt of the Nation; Igbo: Nnu nke Mba
- Location of Ebonyi State in Nigeria
- Coordinates: 6°15′N 8°05′E
- Country: Nigeria
- LGAs: 13
- Date created: 1 October 1996
- Capital: Abakaliki

Government
  - Body: Government of Ebonyi State
  - Governor: Francis Nwifuru (APC)
  - Deputy Governor: Patricia Obila (APC)
  - Legislature: Ebonyi State House of Assembly
  - Senators: C: Kenneth Eze (APC); N: Peter Onyekachi Nwebonyi (APC); S: Ani Okorie (APC)
  - Representatives: List

Area
  - Total: 6,400 km^{2} (2,500 sq mi)
  - Rank: 33rd of 36

Population (2006 Census)
  - Total: 2,176,947
  - Estimate (2022): 3,242,500
  - Rank: 29th of 36
  - Density: 340/km^{2} (880/sq mi)
- Demonym: Ndi Ebonyi

GDP (PPP)
  - Year: 2023
  - Total: $14.5 billion 25th of 36
  - Per capita: $4,376; 15th of 36
- Time zone: UTC+01 (WAT)
- postal code: 840001
- ISO 3166 code: NG-EB
- HDI (2022): 0.706 high · 2nd of 37
- Language: Igbo; English
- Website: http://www.ebonyistate.gov.ng/

Ebonyi (Igbo: Alaọha Ebonyi) is a state in the South-East geopolitical zone of Nigeria, bordered to the north and northeast by Benue State, Enugu State to the west, Cross River State to the east and southeast, and Abia State to the southwest. Named after the Abonyi (Aboine) River—a large part of which is in the state's south—Ebonyi State was formed from parts of Abia and Enugu state in 1996 and has its capital in Abakaliki.

One of the smallest states of Nigeria, Ebonyi is the 33rd largest in area and 29th most populous with an estimated population of nearly 2.9 million as of 2016. Geographically, the state is divided between the Cross–Niger transition forests in the far south and the drier Guinean forest–savanna mosaic in the rest of the state. The other important geographical features are the Cross River and its tributary, the River Aloma, which flow along Ebonyi's southeastern and eastern borders, respectively; while fellow Cross River tributaries, the Abonyi (Aboine), Asu, and Eze Aku rivers run through the state's interior. There are other smaller rivers like Ichelle and Igbe which also form the boundary with Benue State to the west.

After independence in 1960, the area of present Ebonyi was a part of the post-independence Eastern Region until 1967 when the region was split and the area became part of the East Central State. Less than two months afterwards, the former Eastern Region attempted to secede in the three-year long Nigerian Civil War with Ebonyi as a part of the secessionist state of Biafra. At the war's end and the reunification of Nigeria, the East Central State was reformed until 1976 when the state's north became Anambra State and the south became Imo State. Fifteen years afterwards, Anambra and Imo states were divided with their eastern parts becoming Enugu State and Abia State, respectively. It was not until 1996, when Enugu State's east and Abia's northeast were split off and joined to form Ebonyi State.

Economically, Ebonyi State is based around agriculture, mainly of yams, rice, oil palm, and cassava crops. A key minor industry is mining due to lead, zinc, and limestone deposits around Abakaliki, and locally hand-made baskets of various sizes at Ntezi. Ebonyi has the joint-twentieth highest Human Development Index in the country and numerous institutions of tertiary education.

== Geography ==
It was one of the six states created in 1996 by the then federal military government of General Sani Abacha. Bounded by the state of Benue to the north for about 96 km (partly across the Ichelle and Igbe Rivers), Cross River State to the east for 198 km or 123 miles (partly across the River Aloma and Cross River), Abia to the south for 70 km (43 miles), and Enugu to the west for 125 km (77 miles). The State of Ebonyi was created from parts of both Enugu State and Abia State, which were the Abakaliki division from Enugu State and the Afikpo division from Abia State respectively. It has three senatorial zones, the Abakaliki division make up Ebonyi North and Ebonyi Central senatorial zones, while the Afikpo, Edda, Ohaozara, Onicha and Ivo division make up the Ebonyi South senatorial zone. Ebonyi has thirteen local government areas as well as local development centres created by the state government. It is home to eight prominent higher institutions of learning: Ebonyi State University, Abakaliki (EBSU); Alex Ekwueme Federal University Ndufu Alike Ikwo; Akanu Ibiam Federal Polytechnic, Unwana; Federal College of Agriculture, Ishiagu; Evangel University, Okpoto; Federal College of Education (Technical), Isu; Ebonyi State College of Education Ikwo (EBSCOEI); College of Health Sciences, Izhiamgbo; School of Nursing and Midwifery Mater Misericordiae Hospital, Afikpo; School of Nursing and Midwifery Alex Ekwueme Federal University Teaching Hospital, Abakaliki and Ebonyi State College of Health and Midwifery (EBSCONMU), Uburu. In 2021, three other universities were introduced by Governor David Umahi, Aeronautical Engineering and that of Technology in Ezza and Izzi Local Government Areas (LGA), and King David University of Medical Science, Uburu, Ohaozara LGA, Ebonyi State.

=== Climate ===
Ebonyi State has a humid tropical climate, with one rainy season and one dry season lasting for 8 and 4 months, respectively. The temperature typically ranges from 20 to 38 degrees Celsius or 68 to 100 degrees Fahrenheit during the dry season and from 16 to 28 degrees Celsius or 60 to 82 degrees Fahrenheit during the rainy season. Harmattan winds are common between December and January. The average annual temperature is 28 degrees Celsius or 82 degrees Fahrenheit, and the average annual humidity is 50-60%. The region receives an average annual precipitation of 2,500 millimetres or 98 inches.

== Demographics ==
Ebonyi State is home to several distinct Igbo and Korring dialects, spoken in communities such as Edda, Ehugbo (Afikpo), Izhi, Ezza, Ohofia, Mgbo, Ikwo, Oshiri, Unwana, Akpoha, Okposi, Amasiri, and Onicha.

In some areas like Amuda-Okpolo, Ntezi-Okpoto, and Effium, people speak a mixed dialect that combines elements of Igbo and Korring languages. This mixed dialect also shares similarities with Kukelle, spoken in Ukelle in Cross River State, and Kufia, spoken in Ufia (Utonkon) in Benue State.

== Politics ==
The State government is led by a democratically elected governor who works closely with members of the state's house of assembly. The capital city of the state is Abakaliki.

=== Electoral system ===
The electoral system of each state is selected using a modified two-round system. To be elected in the first round, a candidate must receive the plurality of the vote and over 25% of the vote in at least two-thirds of the State local government areas. If no candidate passes the threshold, a second round will be held between the top candidate and the next candidate to have received a plurality of votes in the highest number of local government Areas.

=== Administration ===
In 1999, Dr. Sam Ominyi Egwu was elected as the first governor of the state under the People's Democratic Party (PDP). He was succeeded by Martin Elechi who was elected in 2007 and successfully ran for re-election in 2011, under the same PDP. Gov Martin Elechi was succeeded by Governor, Dave Umahi, who was elected in the March 2015 election and re-elected in March 2019 for a second term in office.. During his second tenure, Governor Dave Umahi defected to All Progressive Congress (APC) just prior to the 2023 General elections. His new party (APC) subsequently produced the Governor that succeeded him, Governor Francis Ogbonna Nwifuru, whose first tenure will elapse on May 29th, 2027. However, he is successfully poised to contest for second tenure under the ruling APC in the State in the 2027 General election.

== Natural resources ==
Ebonyi is primarily an agricultural region. It is a leading producer of rice, yam, potatoes, maize, beans, and cassava, and have a notable basket market in Nigeria. Rice is predominantly cultivated in Ikwo, yams in Izhi, palm oil and cassava in Ohofia with other regions in the state such as Amasiri, Edda and Ezillo making notable contributions, Effium and Ezzamgo taking the top spots in cassava production, and basket production in Ntezi. Ebonyi has several solid mineral resources, including lead, crude oil, and natural gas, but few large-scale commercial mining mines. The state government has, however, given some incentives to investors in the agro-allied sector to encourage production but capacity remains largely under utilized. Ebonyi is called "the salt of the nation" for its huge salt deposit at the Okposi and Uburu Salt Lakes. There are also some tourist locations within the state prominent ones include Abakaliki Green Lake, Uburu Salt Lake, Unwana and Ikwo Beaches.

== Infrastructures ==
Ebonyi has the Ebonyi State International Airport, built on the Abakaliki end of the Abakaliki-Afikpo Expressway. Ebonyi has 23 flyovers, the highest in South East Nigeria. Ebonyi state is known for its trademark concrete roads and multicolored infrastructure, began by former governor Dave Umahi.

=== Federal highways ===
A343 (part of TAH8 Trans-Africa Highway 8 Lagos-Mombasa) east from Enugu State for 85 km via Abakaliki to Cross River State.

F112 the Okigwe-Afikpo road west for 51 km via Amagu to Abia State.

=== Other major roads include ===
the Obollo-Afor-Nkalagu Road north from A343 at Nkalagu via Emezu to Enugu State,

the Abakaliki-Afikpo Expressway south from Abakaliki to Afikpo, and

the Isu-Ndiagu-Amagunze Road southeast from Enugu State to Ndiagu,

the Amoso-Amseri Rd south from Ndiagu via Amaseri and Ngusu to Abia State.

== Local government areas ==
Ebonyi State consists of thirteen (13) Local Government Areas. They are:

- Abakaliki
- Afikpo North
- Afikpo South (Edda)
- Ebonyi
- Ezza North
- Ezza South
- Ikwo
- Ishielu
- Ivo
- Izzi
- Ohaozara
- Ohaukwu
- Onicha

== Languages ==
Igbo language is the primary language and there is Korring language spoken by the Orring people of Ebonyi state who are also found in their numbers in northern Cross River state who are known as Ukelle people, and the Ufia and the Ogballa people found in Ado and Oju LGAs of Benue state. There are primarily eleven Igbo dialects spoken in Ebonyi states. They are: Afikpo, Mgbo, Izhi, Ezaa, Edda, Ikwo, Kukele, Legbo, ohofia-agba, Mbembe, Okposi, Uburu. Languages of Ebonyi State listed by LGA:

LGA	Languages
Abakaliki	Igbo (Izhi)
Afikpo North	Igbo (Afikpo)
Afikpo South	Igbo (Edda)
Ebonyi	Igbo (Izhi)
Ezza North	Igbo (Ezaa), Korring
Ezza South	Igbo (Ezaa)
Ikwo	Igbo (Ikwo, Ezaa)
Ishielu	Igbo (Igbo-esa), Ezaa), Korring
Ivo	Igbo (Ishiagu, Ezaa)
Izzi	Igbo (Izhi)
Ohaukwu	Igbo (Ezaa, Mgbo), Korring
Ohaozara	Igbo (Ohaozara)
Onicha	Igbo (Ohaozara, Ezaa)

== Religion ==
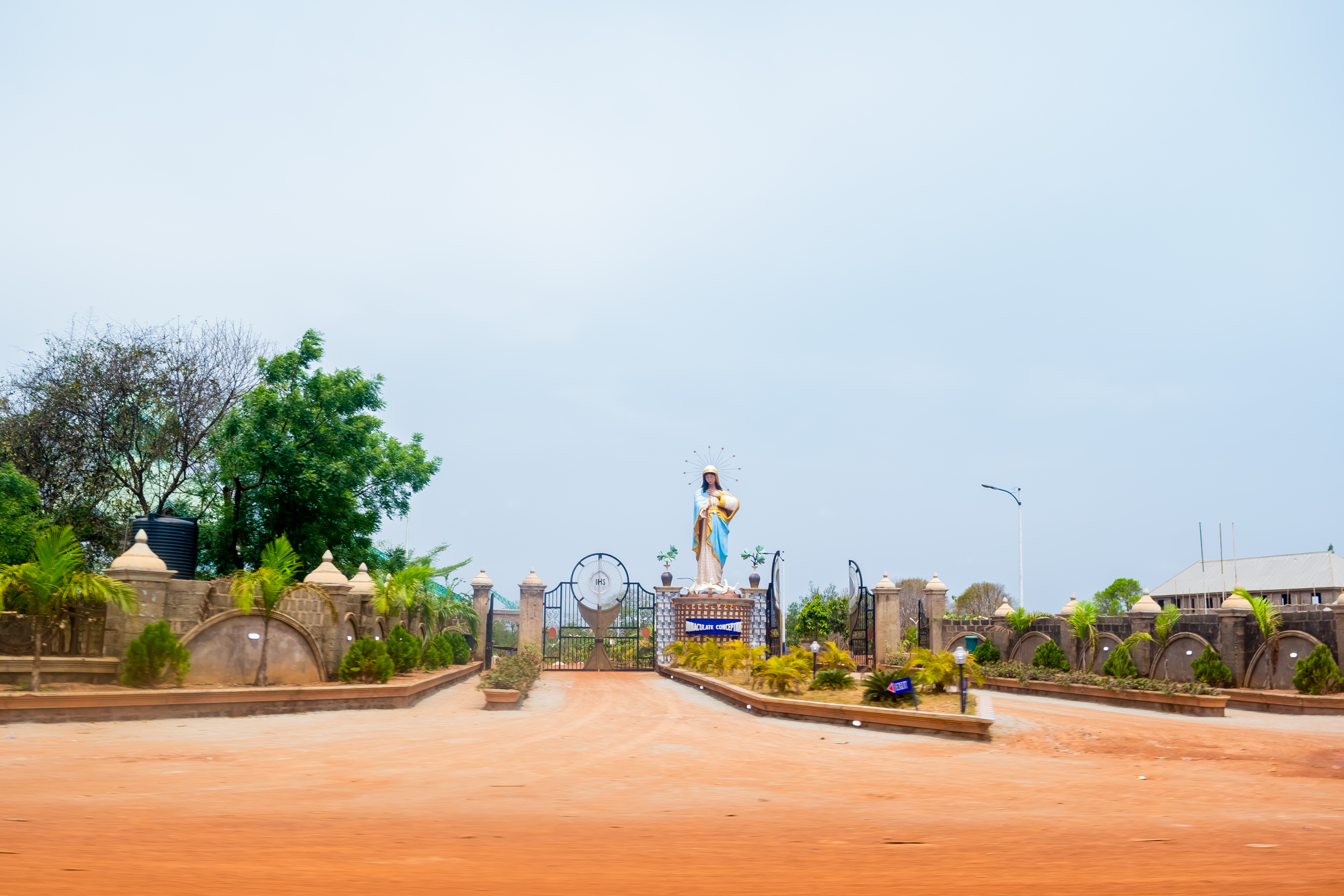
Mary Immaculate Conception, Abakaliki

Ebonyi State are predominantly Christians.

The Catholic Diocese of Abakaliki (1973) with 174 parishes is under Bishop Peter Nworie Chukwu (2021). The Anglican Province of Enugu includes the Dioceses of Abakaliki led by Bishop Monday Nkwoagu, Anglican Diocese of Abakaliki Afikpo led by Bishop Paul Udogu (2010), Anglican Diocese of Afikpo Ikwo led by Bishop Kenneth C. Ifemene, Anglican Diocese of Ikwo and Ngbo led by Bishop Godwin A Awoke (2018) Anglican Diocese of Ngbo.

== Education ==
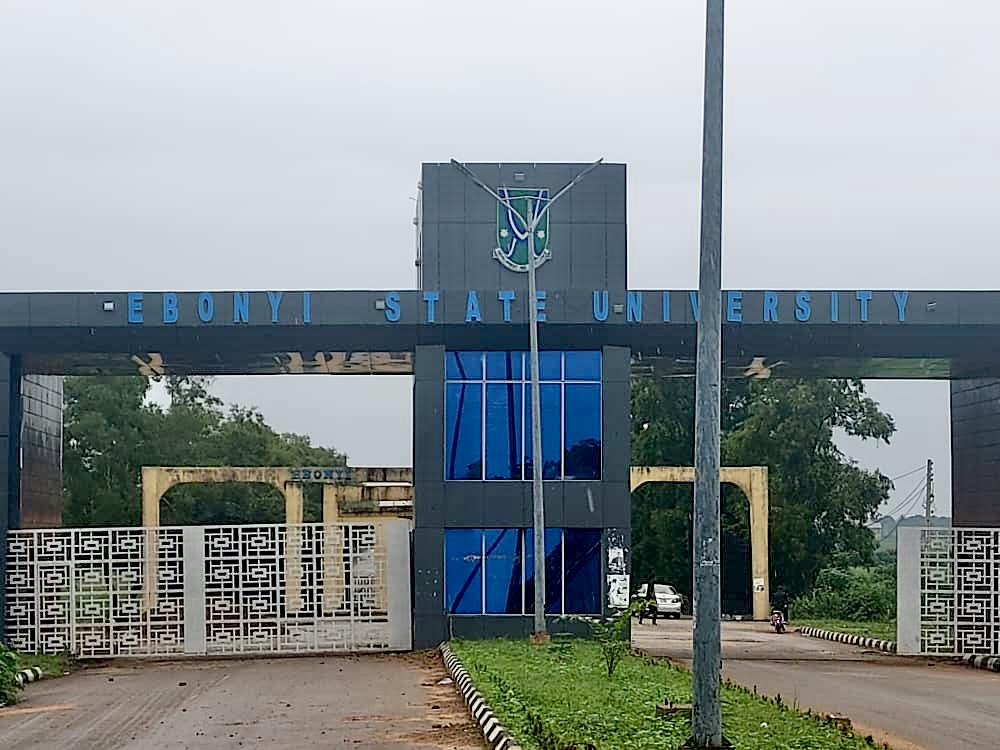
Ebonyi State University, Abakaliki

A list of tertiary institutions in Ebonyi state includes:

- Akanu Ibiam Federal Polytechnic
- Federal College of Agriculture, Ishiagu
- Ebonyi State University
- Federal University Ndufu Alike Ikwo
- Ebonyi State College of Health and Midwifery, Uburu
- Federal College of Education (Technical), Isu
- King David College of Medicine, Uburu, Ebonyi State
- College of Nursing and Midwifery Mater Misericordiae Hospital, Afikpo
- School of Nursing and Midwifery Alex Ekwueme Federal University Teaching Hospital, Abakaliki
- Ebonyi State College of Education, Ikwo
- Evangel University, Okpoto

== Notable people ==
- Anyim Pius Anyim
- Uche Azikiwe
- Andy Chukwu
- Onyebuchi Chukwu
- Martin Elechi
- Akanu Ibiam
- Francis Nwifuru
- Chigozie Ogbu
- Frank Ogbuewu
- Ogbonnaya Onu
- Emmanuel Onwe
- Nnenna Oti
- Patoranking
- Sinach
- Tekno
- Dave Umahi

== See also ==
- List of people from Ebonyi State
- 2011 clashes in Ebonyi State
- "Federal College of Agriculture, Ishiagu".
- Ebonyi State Executive Council
